= Tynell =

Tynell is a surname. Notable people with the surname include:

- Daniel Tynell (born 1976), Swedish skier
- Helena Tynell (1918–2016), Finnish glass designer
- Paavo Tynell (1890–1973), Finnish designer
