= Nanny Still =

Finnish glass designer (1926-2009)

Nanny Still-McKinney
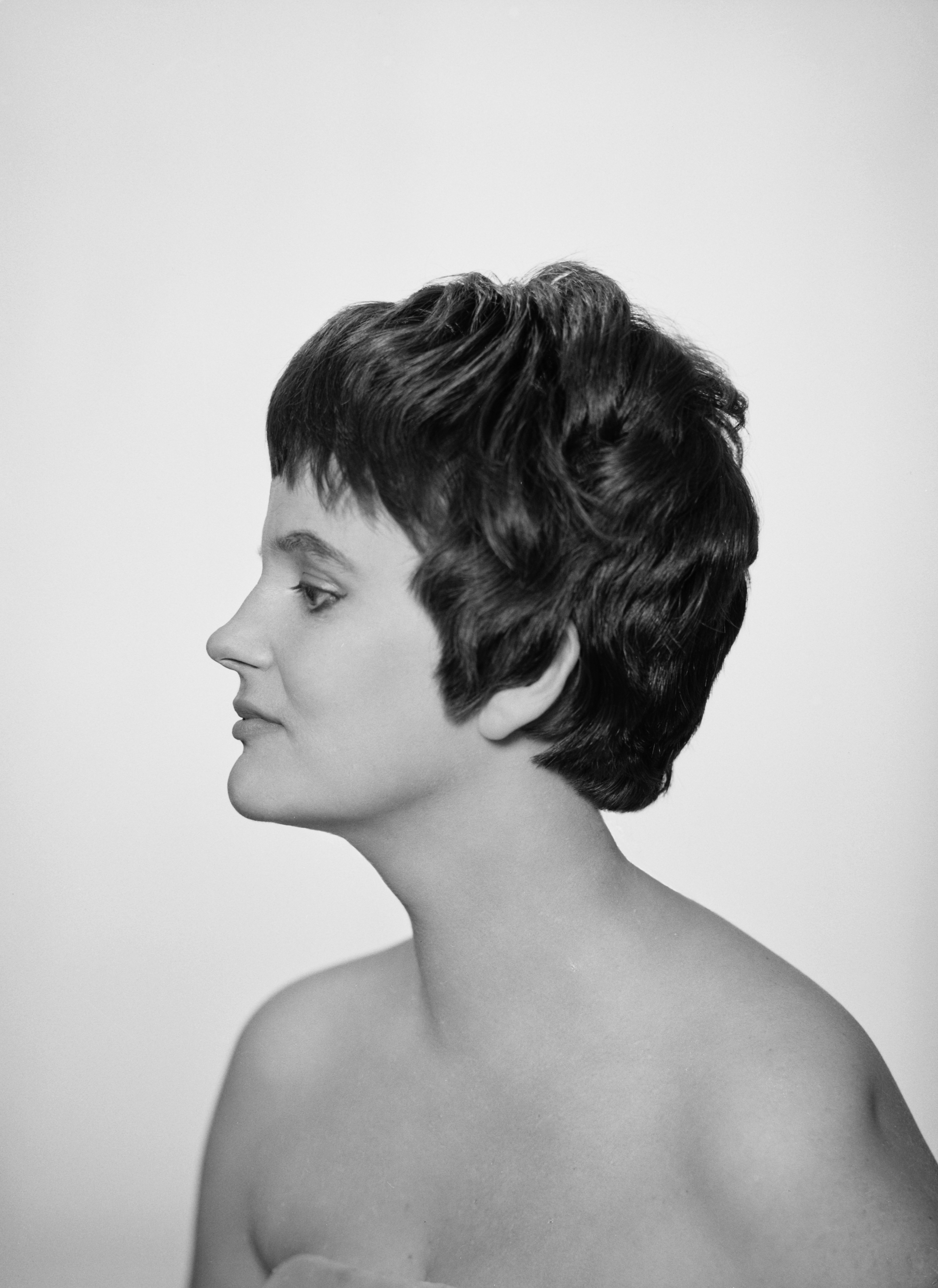
- Nanny Still in 1960
- Born: Nanny Elisabet Still; 31 July 1926; Helsinki, Finland
- Died: 7 May 2009 (aged 82); Brussels, Belgium
- Known for: Glass design
- Spouse: George Clagett McKinney (m. 1958)

Nanny Elisabet Still-McKinney (31 July 1926 — 7 May 2009), best known professionally by her maiden name Nanny Still, was a Finnish industrial designer and glass artist, and one of the country's most influential designers of the post-war period.

== Career ==
Nanny Still studied design at the Central School of Industrial Arts in Helsinki (now part of the Aalto University School of Arts, Design and Architecture) from 1945 to 1949.

Straight after graduation she joined the design team at Riihimäki Glass, as one of their first woman designers, and remained associated with Riihimäki for over quarter of a century, until 1976 when the factory stopped producing artisanal glass. Afterwards she designed for many manufacturers in and outside of Finland, including Rosenthal of Germany.

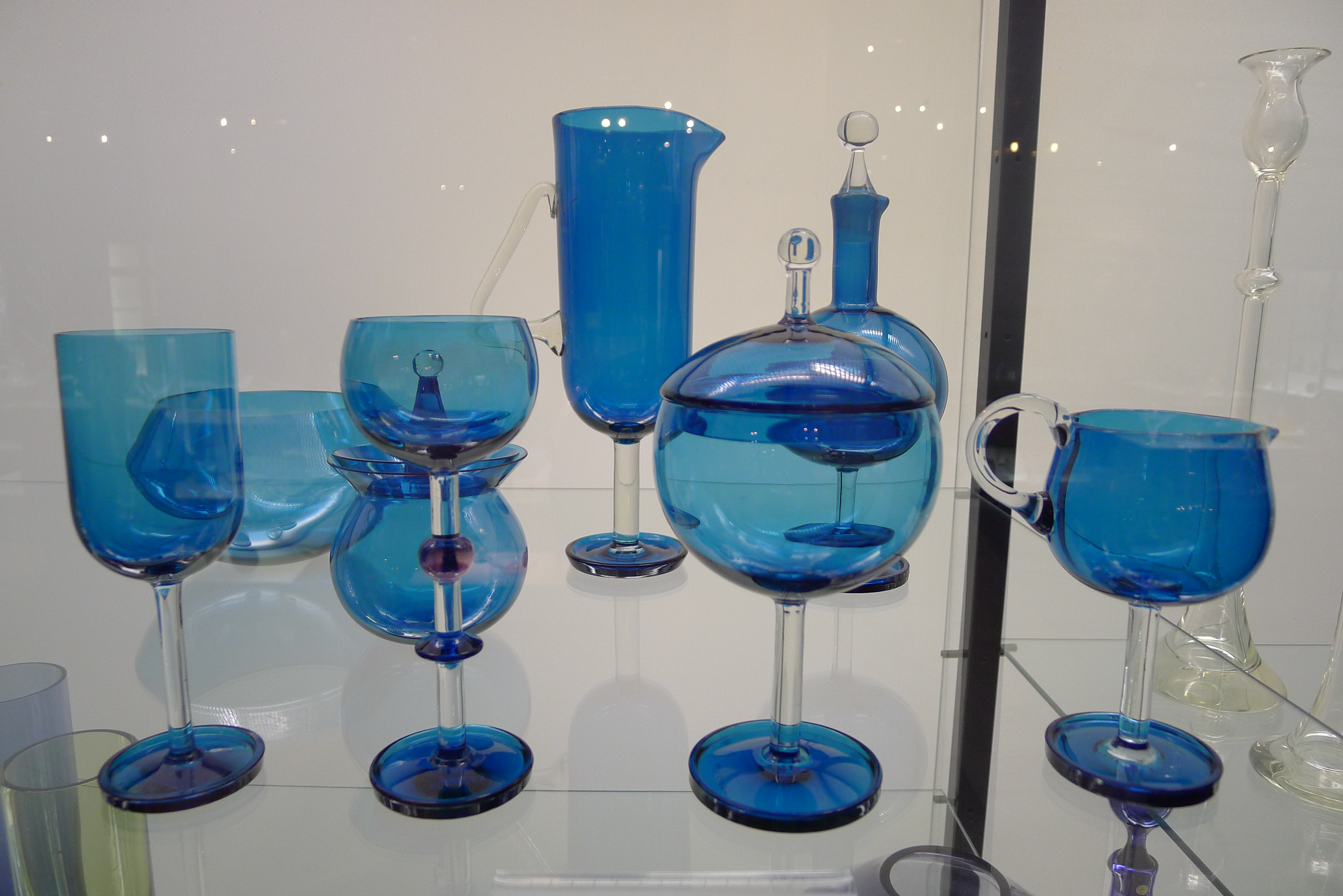
Still's Harlekiini series (1958)

Her perhaps best known glass tableware design is the 1958 Harlekiini of simple geometric shapes in a deep Mediterranean blue.

Still drew attention from early on with her bold use of colours and unconventional shapes. She also became recognised for her technical know-how and mastery of manufacturing methods.

Although best known for glass, Still designed over her long and varied career a wide range of items, from crockery and cutlery to jewellery.

From the 1990s onwards, Still worked mostly on glass sculptures creating utilising in particular the pâte de verre casting technique.

== Recognition ==
In 1972, Still received the Pro Finlandia medal of the Order of the Lion of Finland.

Some of her designs are included in the collections of the British Museum, MoMA and the Metropolitan Museum of Art, among others.

Major retrospective exhibitions of Still's oeuvre were held at least in Belgium (1995, 2006), Finland (1996, 2001) and Hungary (1998).

== Personal life ==
In 1958, Nanny Still married American engineer George C. McKinney, the European and Middle East director of the Virginia Port Authority, and the following year the couple settled in Brussels, where Still lived the rest of her life.
