= Riihimäki glass =

Finnish glass company

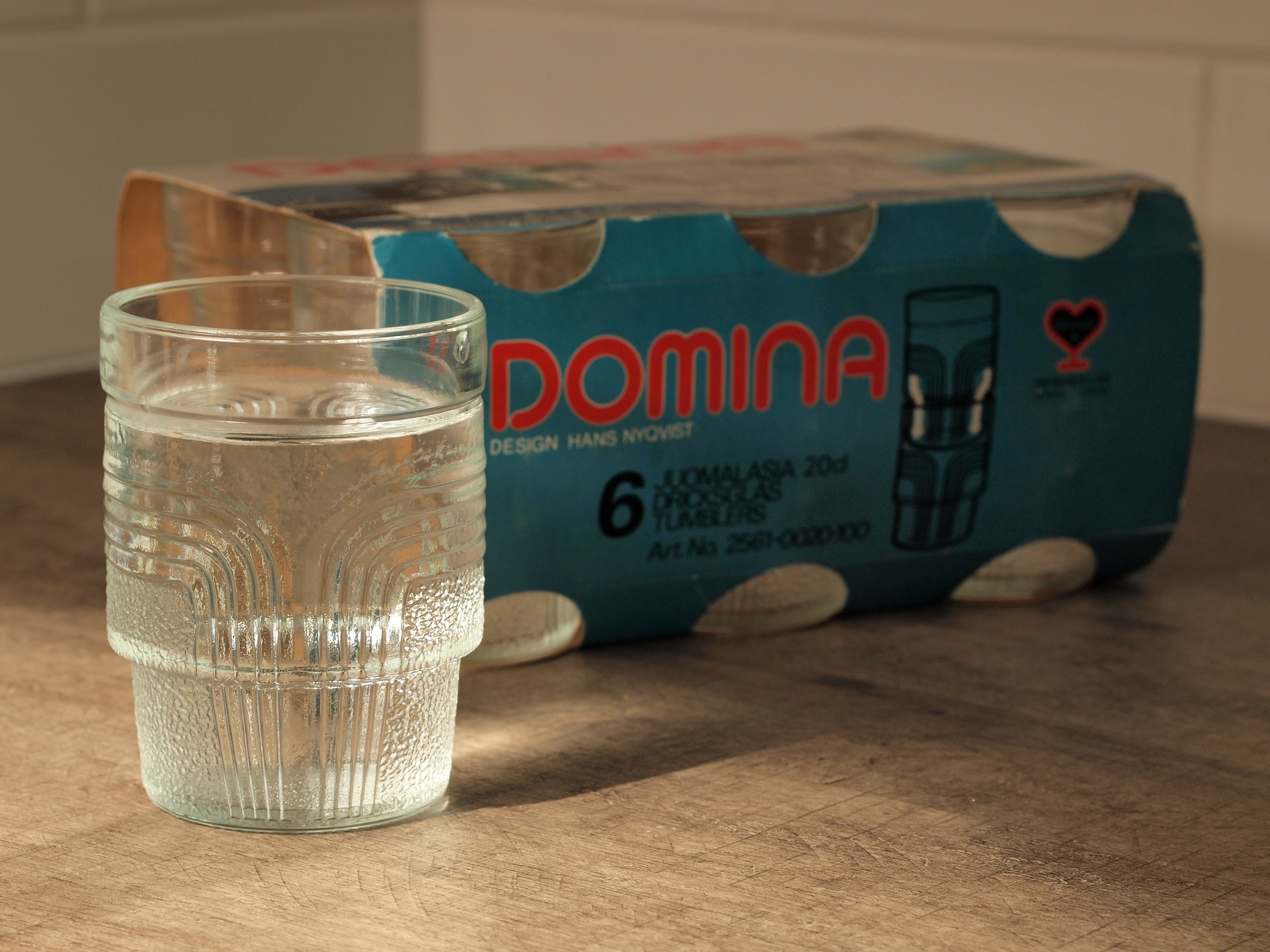
200 cubic centimetres^{*} tumblers from Riihimäen Lasi's 'Domina' series. (*=7.0 imp fl oz; 6.8 US fl oz)

Riihimäki glass (Finnish: Riihimäen lasi) was a glass company in Riihimäki, Finland, in operation from 1910, when it was founded by Mikko Adolf Kolehmainen, to 1990. Their production ranged from basic to high quality glass ornaments, which are now sought after as collectibles, especially some of their vases. Riihimäki products are readily available via collectors' web sites, as are their values.

It produced everyday glassware and art glass until 1976 and cut glass until 1977. After that, it made only machine produced glass and plastic packaging. Ahlstrom Corporation purchased the company in 1980, and closed the Riihimäki plant in 1990.

Among the designers associated with Riihimäki in its early decades were Henry Ericsson, Arttu Brummer, Gunnel Nyman, and after 1945, Tamara Aladin (1959–1976), Greta-Lisa Jäderholm-Snellman, Aimo Okkolin, Sakari Pykälä (1954–1955), Timo Sarpaneva, and Erkkitapio Siiroinen (1968–1976), as well as Helena Tynell. (Note: Helena Tynell designed the hallmark vase titled Aurinkopullo (in Finnish), or Sunglass, which the firm produced between 1964 and 1974.) It was Nanny Still who joined the design team by winning the Nordic art competition the firm held in 1949.

== Finnish Glass Museum ==
Since 1980, the Finnish Glass Museum has been housed in then a glass factory building where Riihimäki Glass started a manufacturing blown glass in 1921. The original owner of that facility was Paloheimo since 1914, which financially supported Riihimäki Glass at its latter stage of operation. The manufacturing at that factory shifted from glass to plastic packaging, then to screen printing.
