= Helena Tynell =

Finnish glass designer

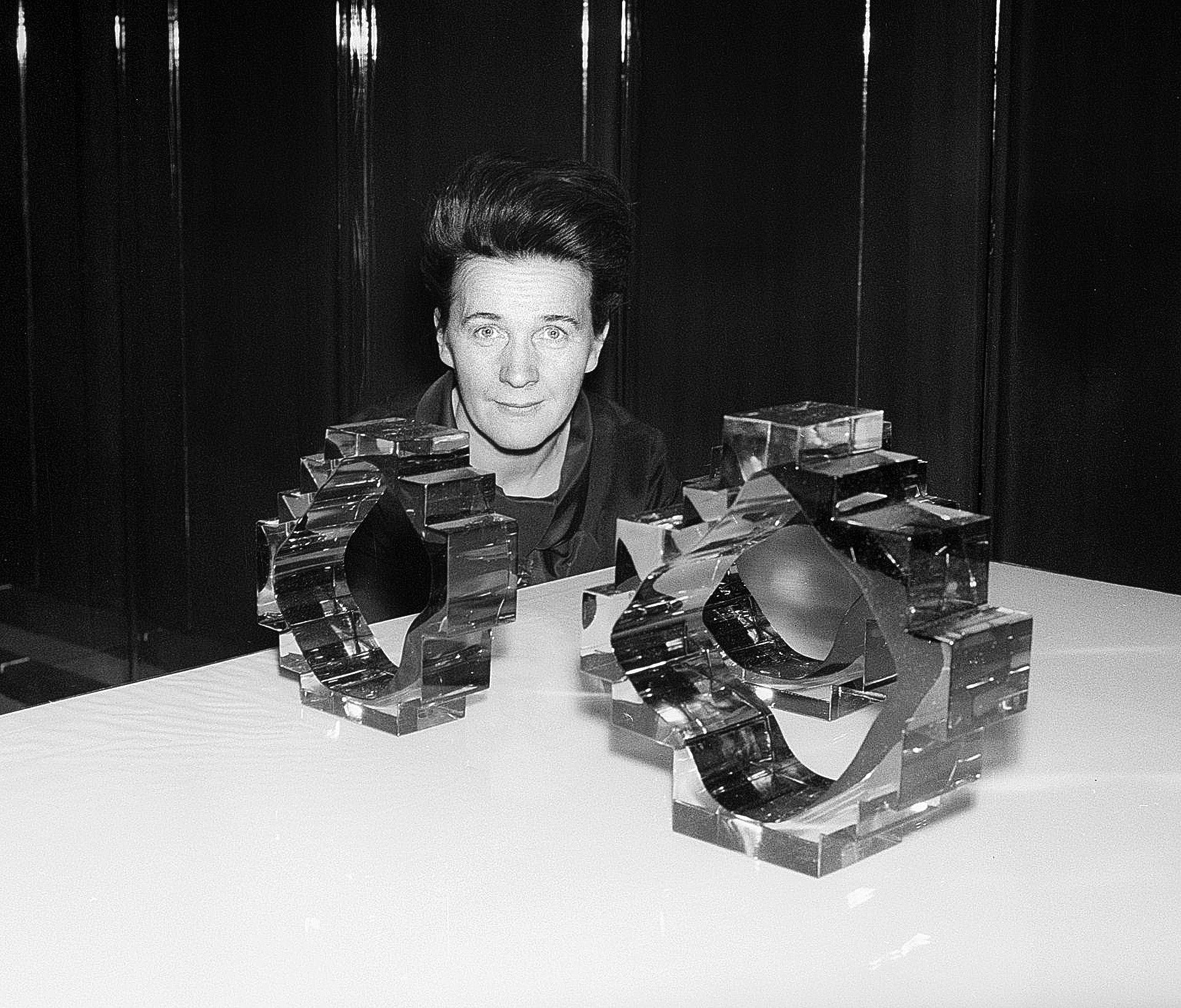
- Helena Tynell in 1965
- Born: Hellin Helena Turpeinen; 10 December 1918; Äänekoski, Finland
- Died: 18 January 2016 (aged 97); Tuusula, Finland
- Known for: Glass design
- Notable work: Aurinkopullo (1964)
- Spouse: Paavo Tynell (m. 1947; died 1973)
- Children: 3

Hellin Helena Tynell (née Turpeinen; 10 December 1918 — 18 January 2016) was a notable Finnish glass designer who has been described as a pioneer of Finnish glass art.

== Education ==
After completing secondary education in 1938, Helena Tynell went on to study model design at the Central School of Industrial Design (Taideteollisuuskeskuskoulu), now part of the Aalto University School of Arts, Design and Architecture, graduating in 1943.

== Career ==
Tynell started her career in 1943 designing for Arabia, a leading Finnish housewares and ceramics manufacturer. At the same time, she also worked for Taito (designers), a design bureau part-owned by her future husband and fellow designer, Paavo Tynell.

In 1946, having decided to focus exclusively on glass, Tynell left Arabia to join a major Finnish glass manufacturer of the time, Riihimäki Glass, where she stayed for most of her career, and created many of her most notable designs.

Finally, in 1976, she moved to Germany, to design for Glashütte Limburg, among others, until her retirement in the early 1990s.

== Legacy ==
Tynell is best known for practical designs, purposefully created for large-scale manufacturing and everyday use. However, she herself was more interested in glass sculpture, experimenting with abstract forms, and other artistic pursuits, using both casting and blowing as well as other techniques.

One of her best-known designs is a vase called Aurinkopullo ('Sun Bottle'), which was produced in the 1960s and 70s in at least 19 different colours and several sizes. In 2018, to mark the 100th anniversary of Tynell's birth, a limited run of 300 pieces was produced.

Tynell's 20th anniversary retrospective exhibition at the Strindbergin taidesalonki ('Strindberg Art Salon') in Helsinki was the first time glass was exhibited in a fine arts gallery in Finland, signifying a certain “coming of age” of Finnish glass art.

She exhibited extensively in Finland and internationally. Her works are included in the permanent collections of the Design Museum, Helsinki, the Nationalmuseum in Stockholm, and the Corning Museum of Glass in Corning, NY, USA.
