= Gunnel Nyman =

Finnish glass artist and designer (1909–1948)

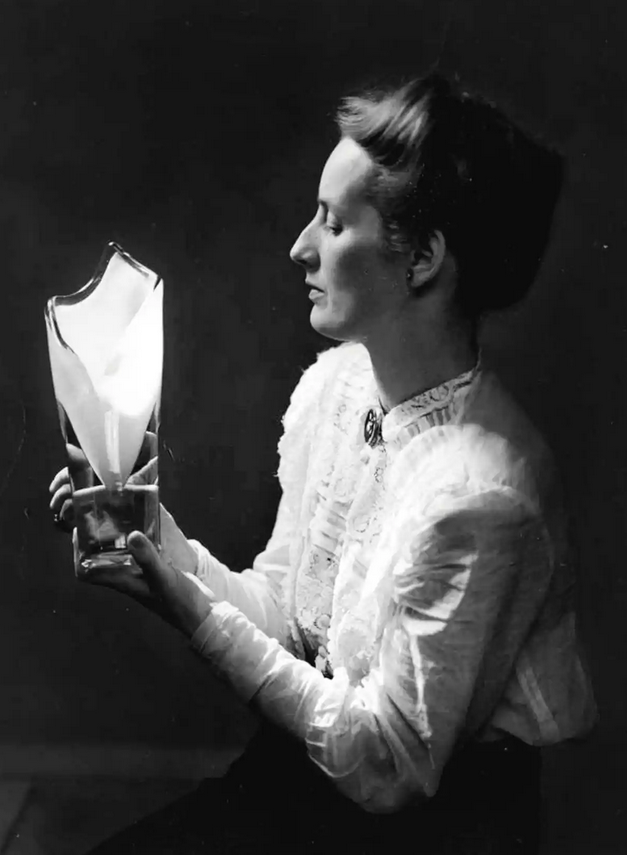
- Born: Gunnel Anita Gustafsson; September 19, 1909; Turku, Finland
- Died: October 7, 1948
- Education: Taideteollinen Korkeakoulu, Helsinki
- Occupation: Artist
- Spouse: Gunnar Nyman

Gunnel Nyman (September 19, 1909 – October 7, 1948) was a Finnish glass and metal artist, and one of the founders of modern Finnish glass design. She was also a proponent of early mass-produced glassware. Nyman's glassware is exhibited in museums internationally.

Born Gunnel Anita Gustafsson in Turku in 1909, she moved to Helsinki with her family in 1922. She married Gunnar Nyman in 1936.

Nyman studied furniture design at the Taideteollinen Korkeakoulu (Central School of the Industrial Arts) in Helsinki, under Arttu Brummer, and worked initially in the functionalist style.

Trained as a furniture designer, Nyman also created metalwork for ecclesiastical use as well as lighting, most notably for Helsinki's Swedish Theater, which she designed in collaboration with the Oy Taito AB metalsmiths.

During the post-war era, she transitioned to glassware and collaborated or worked on commission with various glassworks, including Riihimäki, Karhula-Iittala, and Nuutajärvi.

Her work features organic lines and focuses on the characteristics of glass itself.

Nyman died in 1948 after a long illness. In 1951, she was posthumously awarded the gold medal at the Milan Triennial.
