= Carol Milne =

Canadian American sculptor

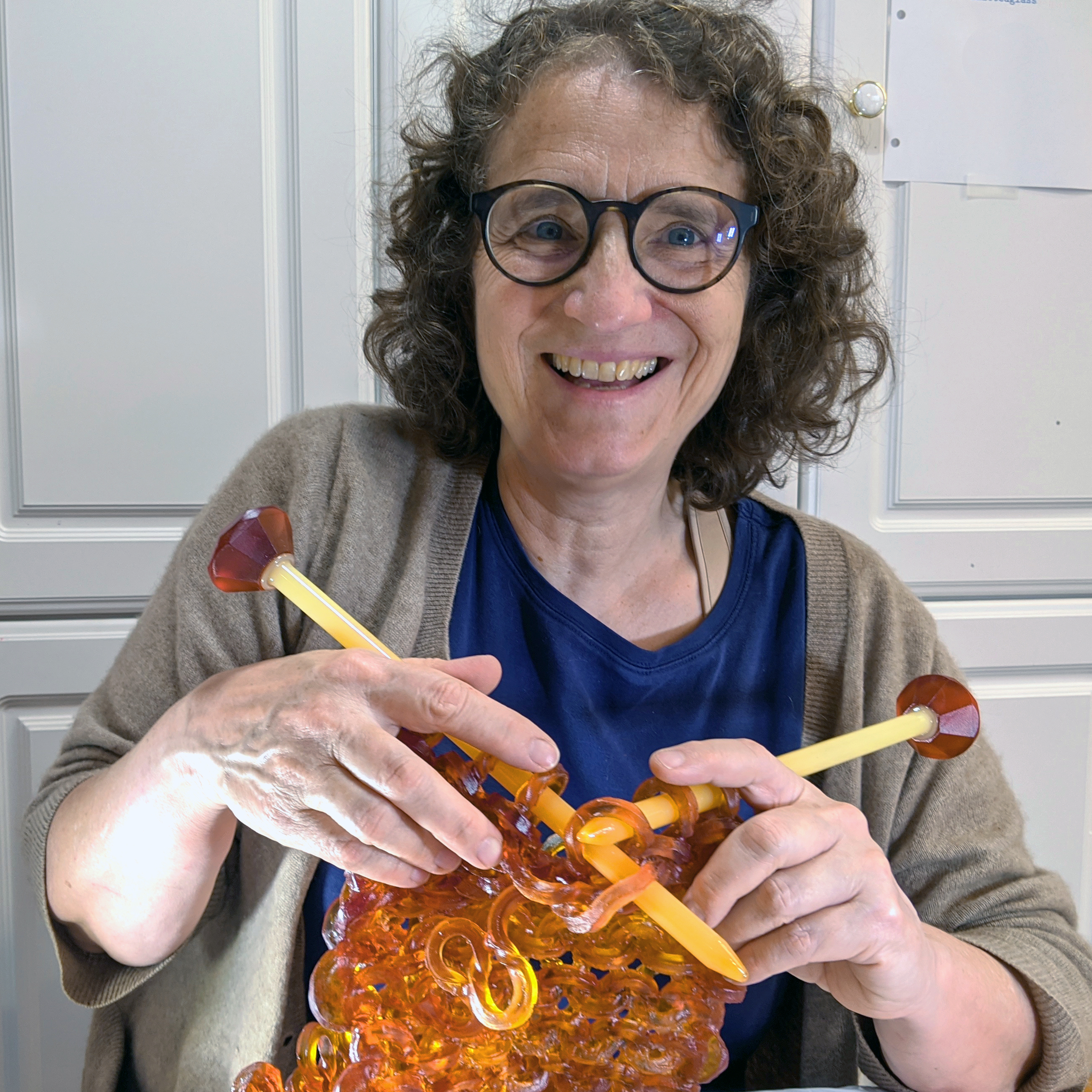
- Carol Milne
- Born: 1962 (age 63–64); Saint John, New Brunswick, Canada
- Education: University of Guelph
- Known for: Knitted Glass work
- Style: sculptor
- Awards: Amazon Artist in Residence (2019); Silver Prize International Exhibition of Glass Kanazawa, Japan (2010)

Carol Milne (1962) is an internationally recognized Canadian American artist living in Seattle, Washington. She is best known for her Knitted Glass work, winning the Silver Award, in the International Exhibition of Glass Kanazawa Japan 2010.

== Education ==
Carol Milne was born in Canada and spent her first eighteen years at eighteen different addresses. She received a degree in Landscape Architecture at the University of Guelph, but realized in her senior year that she was more interested in sculpture than landscape. Her senior thesis, "Landscape as Art/Art as Landscape," drew her into the realm of sculpture and the dye was cast. She attended two years of graduate school in sculpture at the University of Iowa, where she learned about metal casting and experimented with glass. She has been working as a sculptor ever since.

== Knitted Glass ==
In 2006, Milne created "Knitted Glass", incorporating the techniques of knitting, lost-wax casting, mold-making, and kiln-casting. As Milne describes in, "Knitting wasn't yet cool...": The process involves (A) knitting the original art piece using wax strands, (B) surrounding the wax with a heat-tolerant refractory material, (C) then removing the wax by melting it out, thus creating a mold; (D) the mold is placed in a kiln where lead crystal "frit" heated to 1,530 Fahrenheit melts into the mold; (E) after the mold has cooled, the mold material is removed to reveal the finished piece within.

"Carol Milne has blazed a new artistic path with her work in knitted glass. Bringing the visual illusion of softness and drape to a material that is fixed in its final form, her work has a wow factor that encourages you to take a closer look at the nuances of her designs."

== Licton Springs Park ==
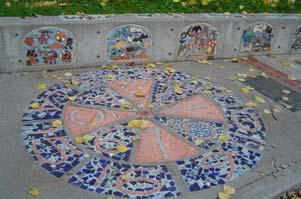
Mosaic tile at Licton Springs Park, Seattle, Washington

From 1993 to 1996, Milne re-designed the Licton Springs, Seattle Playground in Seattle, Washington. Working with ceramicist Lisa Halverson, and community volunteers, they worked with local school children to make urban wildlife tiles that were incorporated into the park design.

Since 2000, Milne has worked primarily in glass, although knitting also plays a major part in her non-glass sculptures. See, for example, "Grow Lights".

== Recognition ==
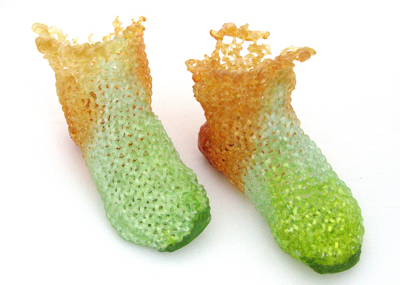
Imperfect For You – SILVER award winner at The International Exhibition of Glass: Kanazawa 2010

- Amazon Artist in Residence, Amazon Headquarters, Seattle, WA, 2019
- Juror's award, "All Things Considered 9: Basketry in the 21st Century", NBO; 2017
- 1 Special Citation & 1 Honorable Mention, 9th Cheongju International Craft Juried Competition, Cheongju, Republic of Korea, 2015
- Joan Eliot Sappington Award, "On the Fringe: Today's Twist on Fiber Art", Lake Oswego Fest.of the Arts, 2015
- 2 Honorable Mentions, Cheongju International Craft Juried Competition, Cheongju, Republic of Korea, 2011
- Honorable Mention purchase award, Art of Our Century, UVU Woodbury Art Museum, Orem, UT
- Silver Prize, International Exhibition of Glass Kanazawa, Japan, 2010
- Grants for Artist Projects (GAP) Award, Artist's Trust, Seattle, WA, 2007
- Ripley's Believe It or Not! – Glass Knitting, 2015

== Permanent collections ==
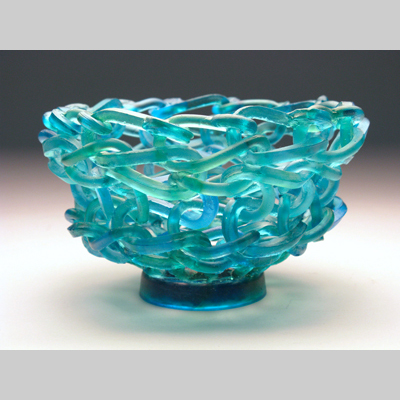
'Knitted Glass' bowl

- Amazon Headquarters, Seattle, WA
- Asheville Art Museum, Asheville, NC
- Bainbridge Island Museum of Art, Bainbridge Island, WA
- Fuller Craft Museum, Brockton, MA
- Glasmuseum Lette, Coesfeld, Germany
- Glass Museum of Charleroi, Belgium
- The Glass Furnace, Istanbul, Turkey
- Gustav Selter GmbH & Co KG, Germany
- The Kamm Teapot Foundation, Sparta, NC
- MusVerre Nord, Sars Poteries, France
- Notojima Glass Art Museum, Ishikawa, Japan
- UVU Woodbury Art Museum, Orem, UT all above

== Articles and interviews ==
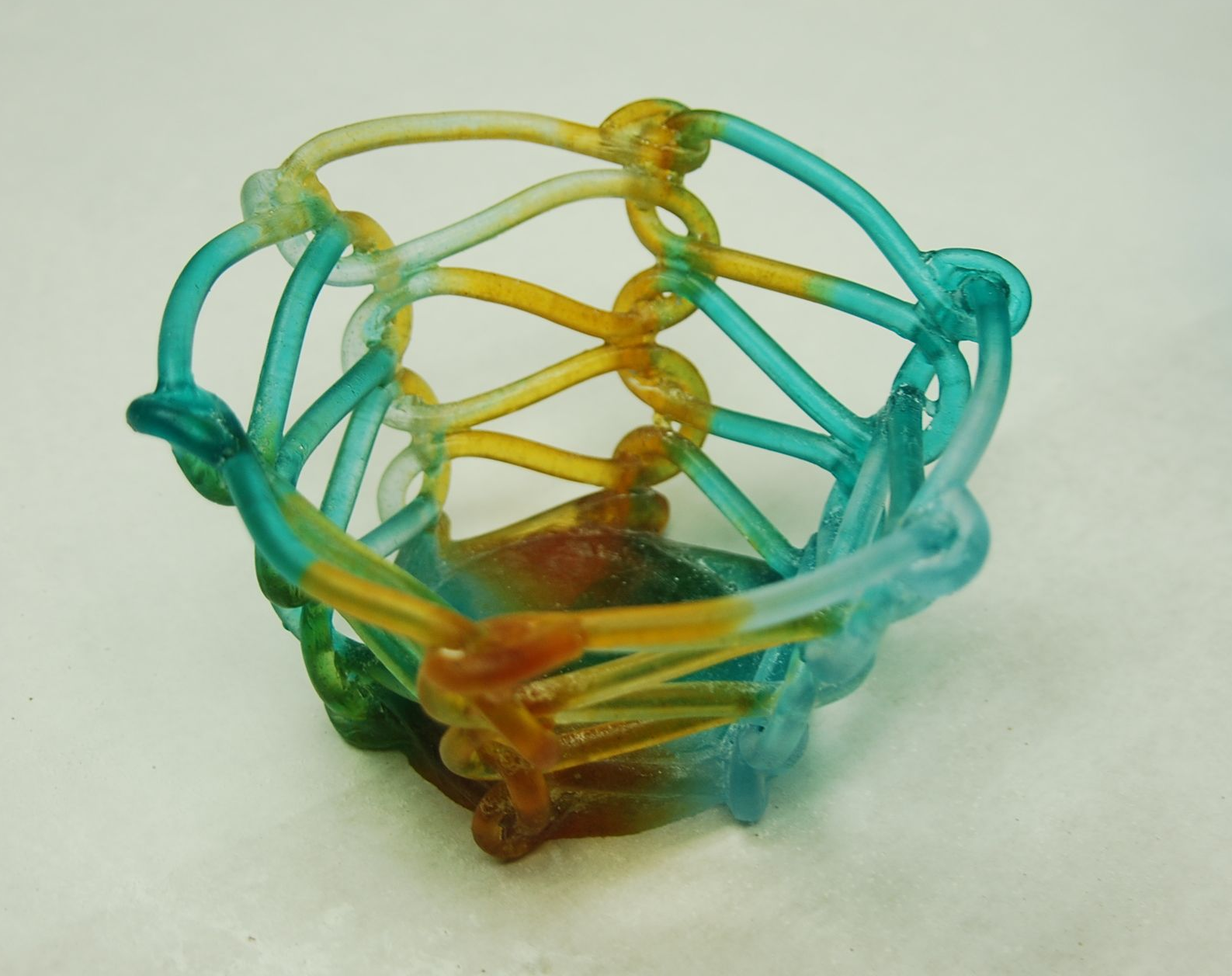
Knitted glass color experiment. 2016

Woven Glass: Artist Carol Milne knits delicate sculptures

Artbeat NW 10-08-19 Glass Artist Carol Milne Artbeat Northwest Arts and Culture Podcast

Seattle Magazine Arts and Culture. Amazon Studios: Inside the Tech Giant's Employee Art Programs

== Books ==
- In the Name of Love by Carol Milne (E-book)
- Knitted Glass: Kiln-cast lead crystal bowls by Carol Milne (E-book)
- Glass Slippers by Carol Milne (E-book)
- Carol Milne Knitted Glass by Steve Isaacson (E-book)
- Carol Milne Knitted Glass: How Does She Do That? by Steve Isaacson (Paperback)

== Notable exhibitions ==
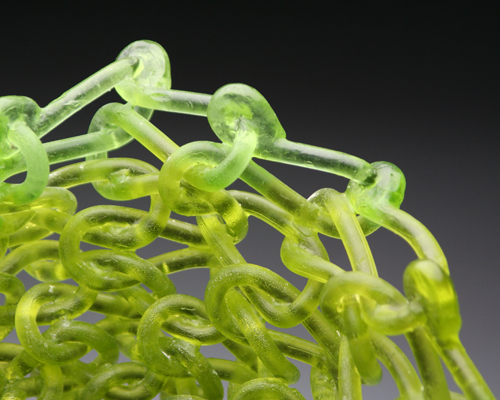
Close-up of Jitterbug - Knitted Glass

2010

- The International Exhibition of Glass Kanazawa 2010, Design Center Ishikawa, Kanazawa, Japan and Notojima Glass Art Museum, Ishikawa, Japan

2011

- 7th Cheongju International Craft Juried Competition, Cheongju, Republic of Korea

2017

- Carol Milne: Knitting Glass, Schiepers Gallery, Hasselt, Belgium

2019

- Carol Milne: Knit Wit, Bainbridge Island Museum of Art

2022

- To Knit or Knot, Blue Spiral 1 Gallery, Asheville, NC

2023

- Knotty & Nice, Culture Object Gallery, NY, NY
- Sur Le Fil, MusVerre le Nord, Sars Poteries, France

2024

- Toyama International Glass Exhibition, Toyama Glass Art Museum, Toyama, Japan
