= Paavo Tynell =

Finnish designer

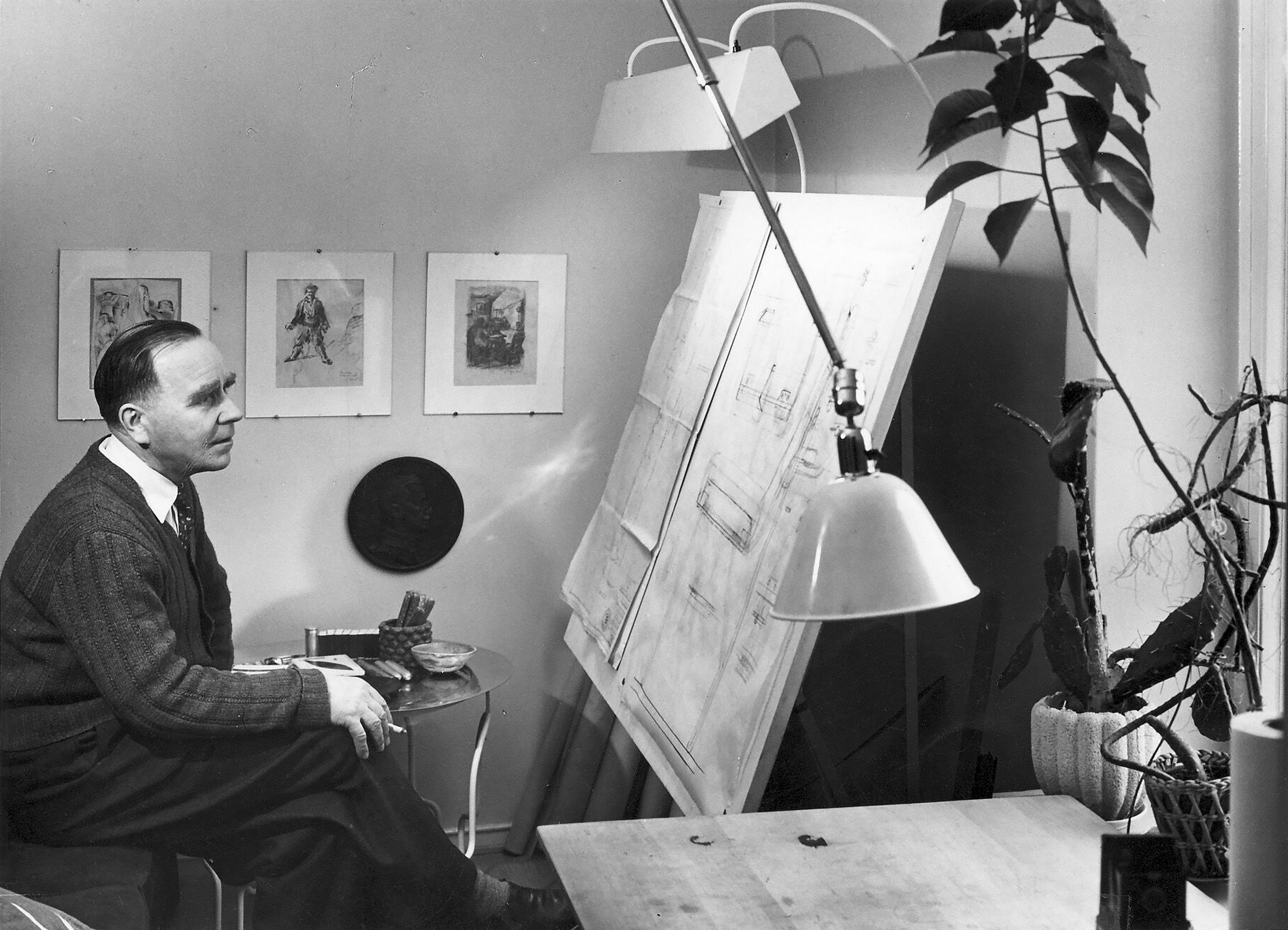
Paavo Tynell.

Paavo Viljo Tynell (25 January 1890 – 13 September 1973) was a Finnish designer who is best known for his lighting fixtures and lamps. Among other things, Tynell designed the lighting for the office of the Secretary-General of the United Nations in New York and for the Parliament House and Lasipalatsi building in Helsinki.

Tynell attended the Central School of Applied Arts in Helsinki, and he taught metalwork there from 1917 to 1923. He was one of the founders and the main designer of Taito company, and managing director of the firm from 1918 to 1953. The founders included designer Eric O. W. Ehrström, sculptor Emil Wikström, goldsmith Frans Nykänen and Gösta Serlachius who acted as investor. He collaborated with distinguished Finnish architects, including Alvar Aalto, and his lamps were widely sold not only in Finland but in the United States too, where his designs were popular especially in the 1950s. He used brass and glass in an elegant and simple fashion, and his designs were often decorated with perforated patterns. In 2018, the Danish design company Gubi relaunched a collection of Tynell's lighting designs.

Certain of Tynell's lamps have been auctioned at high prices. In 2019, for instance, his pendant “Snowflake” from circa 1950 was sold for €180,000 at Artcurial in Paris and an electrolier from the same time period for €134,000 at Christie's in New York.

Since 1947, Paavo Tynell was married to the glass designer Helena Tynell, née Turpeinen (1918–2016). They had three children.

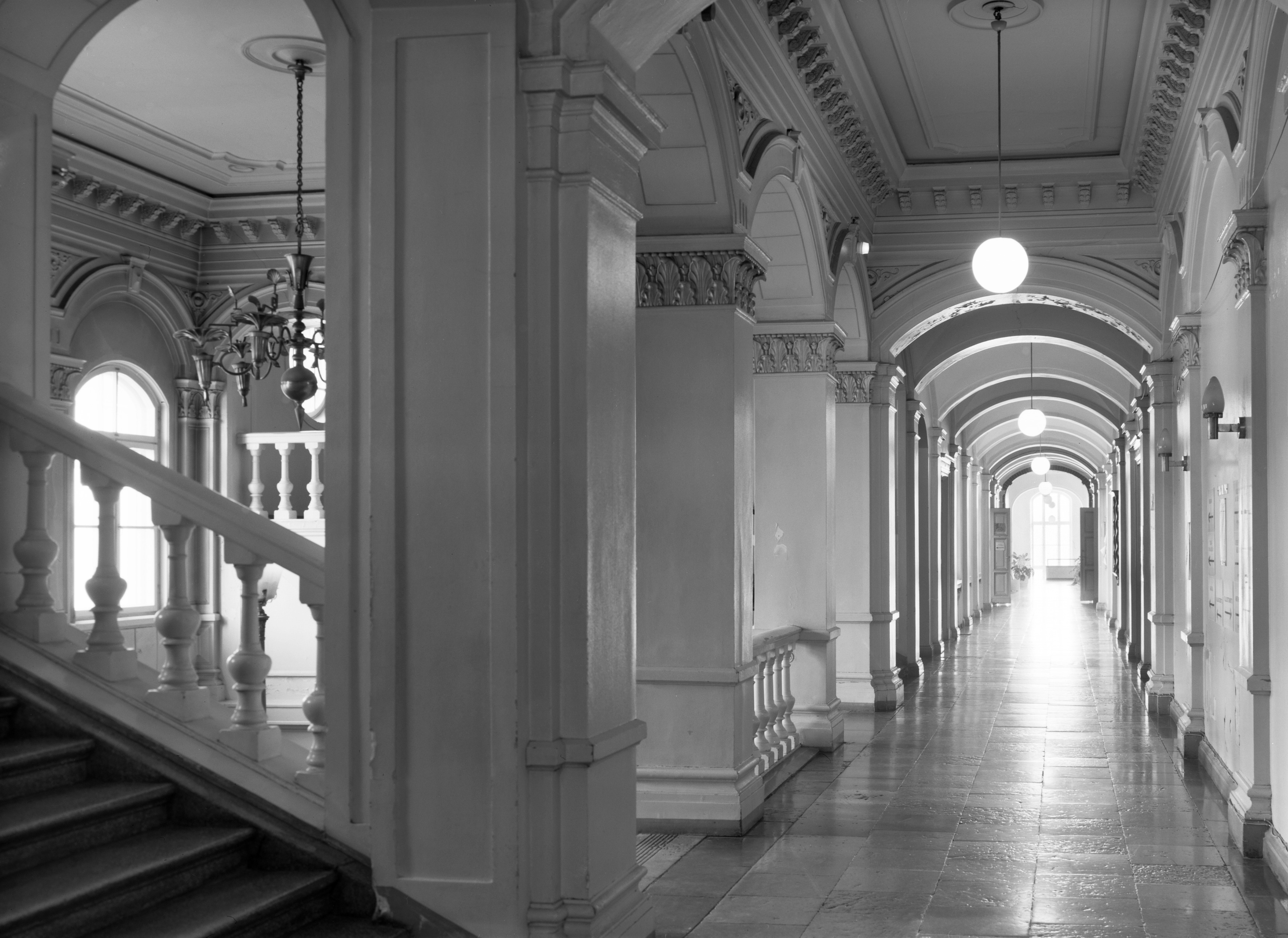
Paavo Tynell lighting system designed for the interior of Helsinki University of Technology.

As the head of metalwork and in charge of designing light fixtures, Taito and Tynell worked in close cooperation with architects. In particular, Tynell designed light fixtures for a building at Helsinki University of Technology, realised by architect Armas Lindgren. From this point, private homes started to be fitted with light fixtures, and Taito's factory relocated to larger premises and hired more workers. Taito's first catalogue showcasing only light fixtures was released in 1932.
