= Painting with Fire =

Painting with Fire (PWF) is the name given to an immersion process for creating torch fired enamel jewelry. This process is the focal point of torch fired enamel jewelry workshops taught by Barbara A. Lewis, written about in her book, and discussed in Belle Armoire Jewelry, Handcrafted Jewelry, Bead Trends, Stringing and Bead Unique.

== Traditional Enameling Methods ==
Historically, enameling is the application of glass-on-metal (See vitreous enamel). Traditional enameling methods, such as Cloisonné and Grisaille, require expensive kilns and often years of training and experience.

== The Painting with Fire Process ==
The torch firing of enamel, a process that requires a fuel source such as propane or map gas, is inexpensive and accessible to the jewelry artist who has neither the time nor the financial resources to create a traditional enamel studio.

The predominant process for producing torch fired enamel jewelry involves placing a cold and pre-washed metal piece (typically copper) on a tripod, heating the piece with a hand-held gas-fueled torch and sifting enamel onto the heated metal. This method, while less expensive than kiln-fired enameling, can be slow and pose significant safety concerns.

More than 40 years ago, Joseph Spencer of Safety Harbor, Florida, pioneered Multi-Torch Fired Enameling Barbara Lewis, a long-time ceramic artist and student of Spencer, has applied Spencer's process to develop the Painting with Fire (PWF) Immersion Process.

Unlike the usual tripod-based torch firing methods, the PWF Immersion Process uses a mounted, inexpensive stationary torch and heating the unwashed cold metal in the flame using a welding tig rod (stainless steel mandrel). The heated metal is then immersed directly into the powdered enamel (Thompson Enamel 80 mesh opaque or transparent), then reheating and repeating the immersion process three times – a total of no more than 60–90 seconds per piece. Using Lewis’ patent pending Bead Pulling Station, the thrice-coated enamel bead is then gently pulled from the mandrel and allowed to fall into a simple bread pan filled with garden vermiculite.

== The PWF process with iron and sterling silver ==
Other kiln and torch firing processes for producing enamel jewelry have typically been limited to pure copper or expensive fine silver. These other methods can be used to enamel sterling silver, but only after completing the laborious process of depletion gilding. With the PWF method, if using transparent enamels in cool colors (blue or green), there is no requirement to heat and dip the oxidized silver into pickling acid. The immersion method involves the same three-times heating and immersion of the sterling piece, attached to the stainless steel mandrel, and coating with transparent enamel.

Lewis’ PWF method also pioneered the enameling of lightweight iron filigree beads. The PWF immersion method allows for artistic variations using multiple combinations of opaque and transparent enamels or reducing the oxygen to create smoky hazes. These variations and other applications of the PWF method are discussed in a "ning" network. The PWF immersion method is the subject of Torch Fired Enamel Jewelry – A Workshop in Painting with Fire.
