= Asheville Art Museum =

Museum in Asheville, North Carolina

Coordinates: 35.5944°N 82.5510°W

- Established: 1948
- Location: 2 South Pack Square, Asheville, North Carolina, US
- Type: Art museum
- Accreditation: American Alliance of Museums
- Key holdings: Black Mountain College collection; Southeast American Studio Craft; Cherokee artists
- Collections: 20th and 21st-century American art
- Collection size: 8,000+ works
- Director: Pamela L. Myers
- Website: www.ashevilleart.org

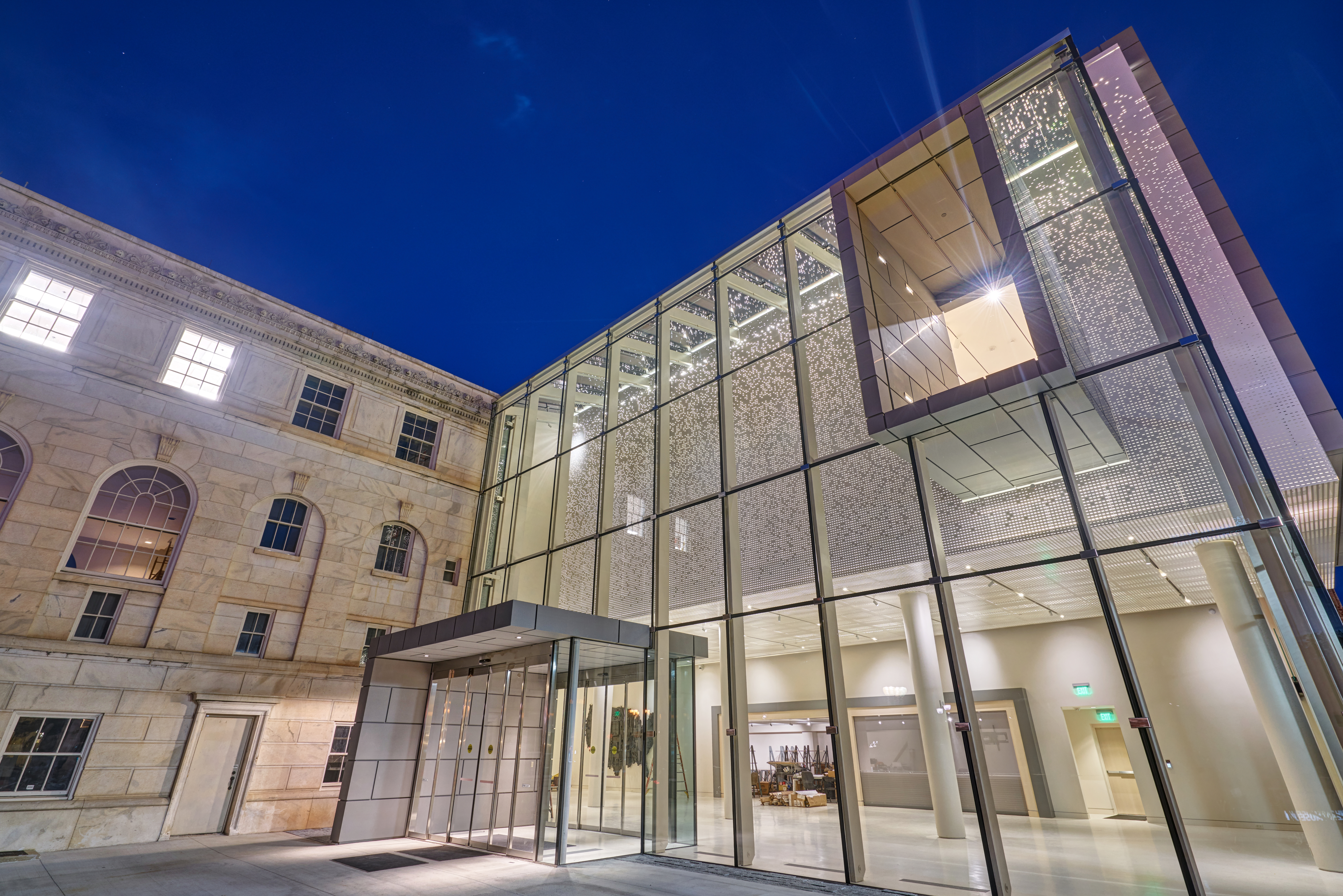
The newly renovated Asheville Art Museum at night

The Asheville Art Museum is a nonprofit visual art organization in Western North Carolina (WNC) and is accredited by the American Alliance of Museums. The museum is located on the center square of downtown Asheville, 2 South Pack Square at Pack Place.

The Asheville Art Museum presents exhibitions and public programs based on its permanent collection of 20th and 21st century American art. The museum features regional and national artists through special exhibitions, and showcases works of significance to Western North Carolina's cultural heritage including Studio Craft, Black Mountain College and Cherokee artists. Educational programs for children and adults are also offered.

== History ==
Incorporated in 1948, the museum's original home was a three-room building on Charlotte Street, once the land sales office of E.W. Grove, developer of the Grove Park Inn. By 1950, the museum began acquiring a permanent collection. Quickly, the collection outgrew its home, and the museum moved to donated space on the 15th floor of the Northwestern Bank Building, now the Arras Building. Forced to move out of the donated bank building space, the museum purchased property at 152 Pearson Drive (the Gay Green House) in the Montford Area Historic District of Asheville, and exhibitions became more regional in scope. Programming and attendance expanded, but the aging 40-year-old building presented problems.

When plans for the Asheville Civic Center were announced in 1972, the museum board accepted an invitation to be one of the three cultural agencies in the center. In 1976, the museum opened a 9,000-square-foot (840 m^{2}) facility in the Civic Center. In 1984, the Asheville Art Museum became one of few of its size to be accredited by the American Alliance of Museums.

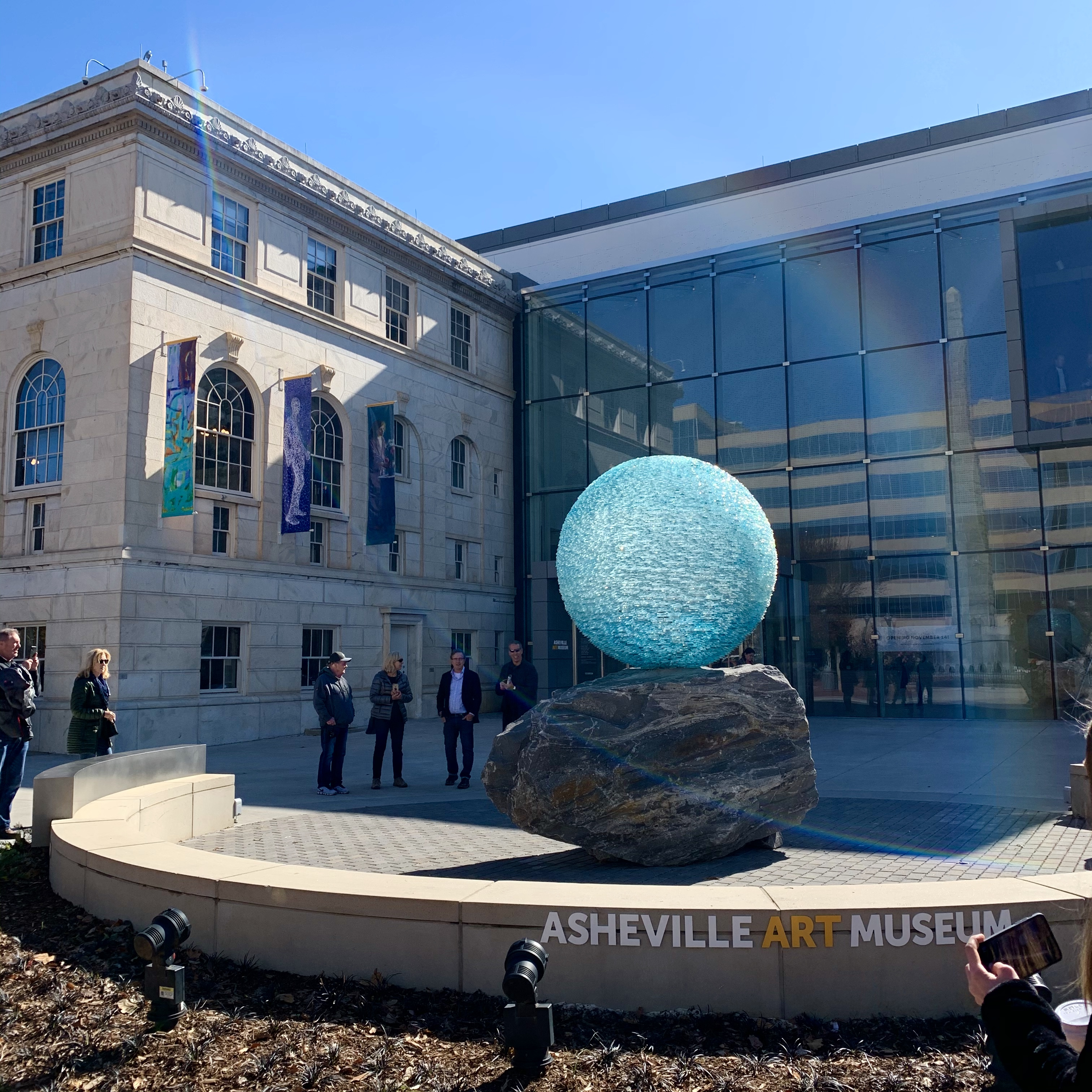
Reflections on Unity is the first public art installation in the plaza

In 1992, the museum opened in a 1925 Italian Renaissance style building with contemporary additions that once housed Pack Memorial Library. That facility includes 12,000 square feet (1,100 m^{2}) of space in the Pack Place Education, Arts & Science Center complex in downtown Asheville.

A modest capital expansion, completed in 1999, added space from Pack Place and the adjacent Legal Building, creating new classroom and studio facilities, an art library, a teacher resource center, a community gallery and a new entrance. Following this expansion, the museum occupied 24,400 square feet (2,270 m^{2}) of space.

Between September 2016 and November 2019, the museum expanded into space formerly occupied by The Health Adventure, increasing its size to 54,000 square feet. During this expansion, the permanent collection grew to comprise 8,000+ works (a 31.5% increase since 2017).

The museum reopened on November 14, 2019. The first public art installation in the plaza is the six-foot diameter chiseled glass orb entitled "Reflections on Unity" by the artist Henry Richardson.

In June 2022 the Asheville Art Museum was one of three museums to be awarded the 2022 National Medal for Museum and Library Service by the Institute of Museum and Library Services.

== Leadership ==
The museum was founded in 1948 by local artists. Its first full-time director was James E. Neumann, hired in 1965 just before the museum's move from Charlotte Street to the Northwestern Bank Building. Neumann resigned in 1966 to accept a position with the Greenville Museum of Art, and F. Edward Barnwell assumed duties as director. In 1970, Richard Van Kleeck served as director, and oversaw the museum's move to its new location in the Montford District. Walter B. Elcock III was hired as the museum's director in 1971.

Thomas (Tom) Gilmartin succeeded Elcock in 1973 and served until August 1977, after which Mary Alice Young became the museum's first female director. Upon Young's resignation in 1979, Carolyn Williams served as acting director. Disputes with the Board of Directors were reported to have caused the spate of resignations in the late 1970s.

Following a six-month search the museum board hired Edwin (Ed) Ritts, Jr., whose directorship from 1980 to 1995 included achieving accreditation, expanding beyond local and regional art, moving to Pack Place, and increasing staff size. Since December 1995, Pamela L. Myers has served as the museum's director.

== Controversies ==
In 2013, a former mayor of Asheville criticized the use of taxpayer funding for the museum's $24 million expansion, and described tensions between other nonprofit organizations that had shared the Pack Place Education, Arts & Science Center building complex prior to the expansion.

In 2020, curators and artists expressed concern for the museum's practice of paying living artists primarily in "exposure".

In 2022 the Asheville Art Museum was accused by former employees and trustees of promoting a toxic work environment, lack of transparency, and board issues. Twenty-nine current and former staff members called for the museum's director Pam Myers to be removed, citing verbal and emotional abuse, sexual harassment, and bullying among their negative experiences.
