= Factory glass =

Mass-produced glass objects

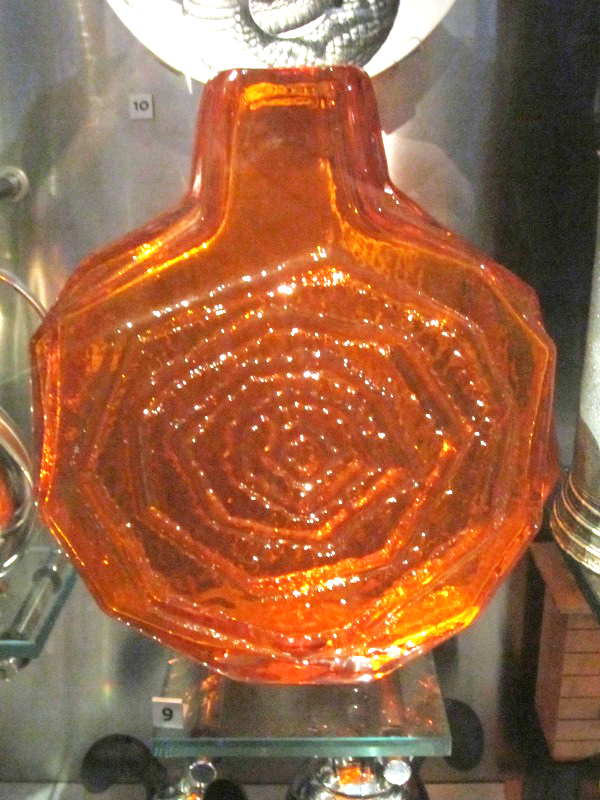
"Banjo" vase, in tangerine orange, Whitefriars Glass, London, late 1960s. Designed by Geoffrey Baxter, but made on a scale that makes it factory glass

Factory glass is a term used by collectors of glass objects with artistic aims to distinguish items, mostly of decorative rather than utilitarian function, made on a larger scale in a factory, from the more individual or unique studio glass and by studio glass artists to distinguish their work from the more standardised items which are generally made in larger glassworks. It can be an equivalent for the 20th century of the term art glass, which is largely applied to 19th-century or early 20th-century pieces.

It is difficult to specify how large a glassworks would be before it is considered a factory but size is not the key indicator. The crucial distinction would be where there is a significant degree of specialisation or "division of labour" as opposed to the more hands-on working methods used by a single glass artist, with perhaps an assistant, in a studio.

The many other types of glass in use are generally made on a large scale in factories. They are usually referred to by their individual names; for example; float glass (for windows) and "glass packaging" (bottles, jars, and containers) and domestic glassware.

== Exceptions ==
Not all glass made in factories counts because more individual, limited edition or one-off pieces were made for a variety of reasons. Examples would include; experimental, "end-of-day" and apprentice pieces and "friggers" (test or trial pieces) but also special orders and one-off commissions.

=== Factory "studio" glass" ===
At the US Fenton Art Glass Company, Dave Fetty, a factory glass worker for most of his career, was allowed to use specialist skills, learned before joining the factory, in limited editions of "offhand" pieces without the use of moulds. Such pieces are more akin to studio glass than "factory glass".

In the United Kingdom, Whitefriars Glass and Caithness Glass, have produced limited production "studio" lines alongside standard production in the same factory. At the ZBS glassworks in Czechoslovakia, there was a separate department for making more experimental studio type pieces which were later hived off and came to be called Libera. The small Skrdlovice works was used by designers in the communist era to test out their designs with short runs before some went on to full production at other factories. The limited test items are much more prized by collectors but it is often difficult to be sure which ones these are and which ones were replicated in full production runs elsewhere.

== Standardised production ==
While, the exceptions would generally account for a very small proportion of overall production, the term applies, strictly speaking, only to the production which was standardised, where many workers would be involved in the making of each item.

== See also ==
- History of glass
- Pressed glass
