= Henry Richardson (artist) =

American sculptor (born 1961)

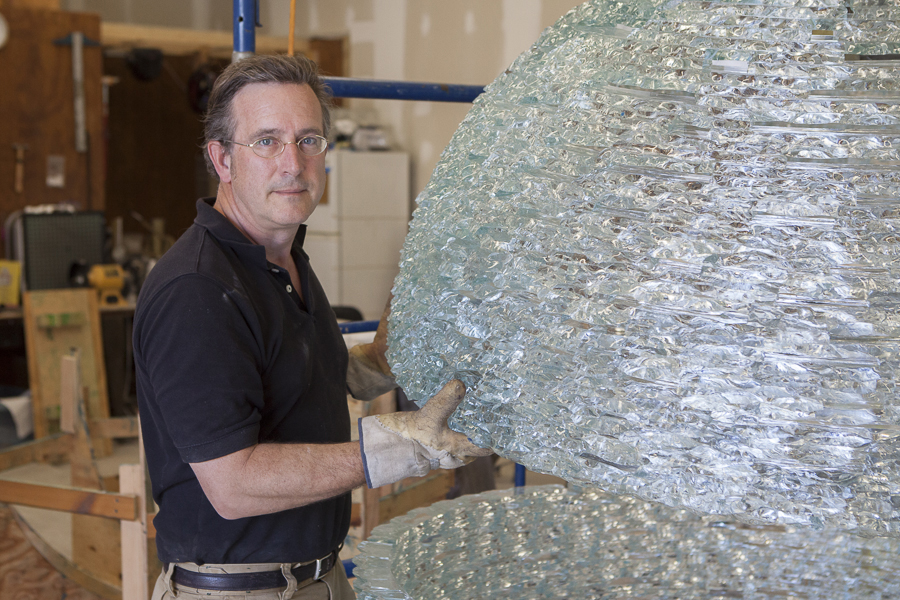
- The glass artist Henry Richardson in his studio
- Born: March 1961 (age 65); Syracuse, NY
- Education: Haverford College
- Known for: Sculpture, public art

Henry Burtt Richardson (born March 1961) is an American sculptor. He works primarily in the medium of plate glass.

== Early life and education ==
Richardson was born in Syracuse, New York and grew up outside of Washington, DC. His family was involved in medicine: his father, H. Burtt Richardson Jr, was a pediatrician and academic, his mother, Gladys, a pediatric health educator, and his uncle, William C. Richardson, was President of Johns Hopkins University and the Kellogg Foundation. He studied geology and art at Haverford College, graduating in 1983. He is Quaker, which inspires the continuing theme of "inner light" in his work.

== Works and process ==
Richardson began as a realist painter. He became certified in concrete and steel in order to walk the beams on building sites, and these became the subjects of his early paintings. He became familiar with building materials, including concrete and glass, and together with his geology background, began to explore the possibilities of plate glass as an artistic medium.

Richardson treats glass as a transparent stone, using a hammer and chisel to shape it. He has developed a method of bonding the layers together with a polymer silicate and UV light. The layers are then sculpted into large abstract spheres, columns and spirals which appear "ethereal" and light despite their weight. As the work evolved, Richardson began adding color, mixing his own pigments and infusing them into the glass.

Richardson was commissioned to design the memorial to the Connecticut victims of the 9/11 terrorist attacks. His work may also be found in numerous public and private collections. In 2012, he was named the Artist of the Year by the Design Center of the Americas (DCOTA) Stars of Design Awards.

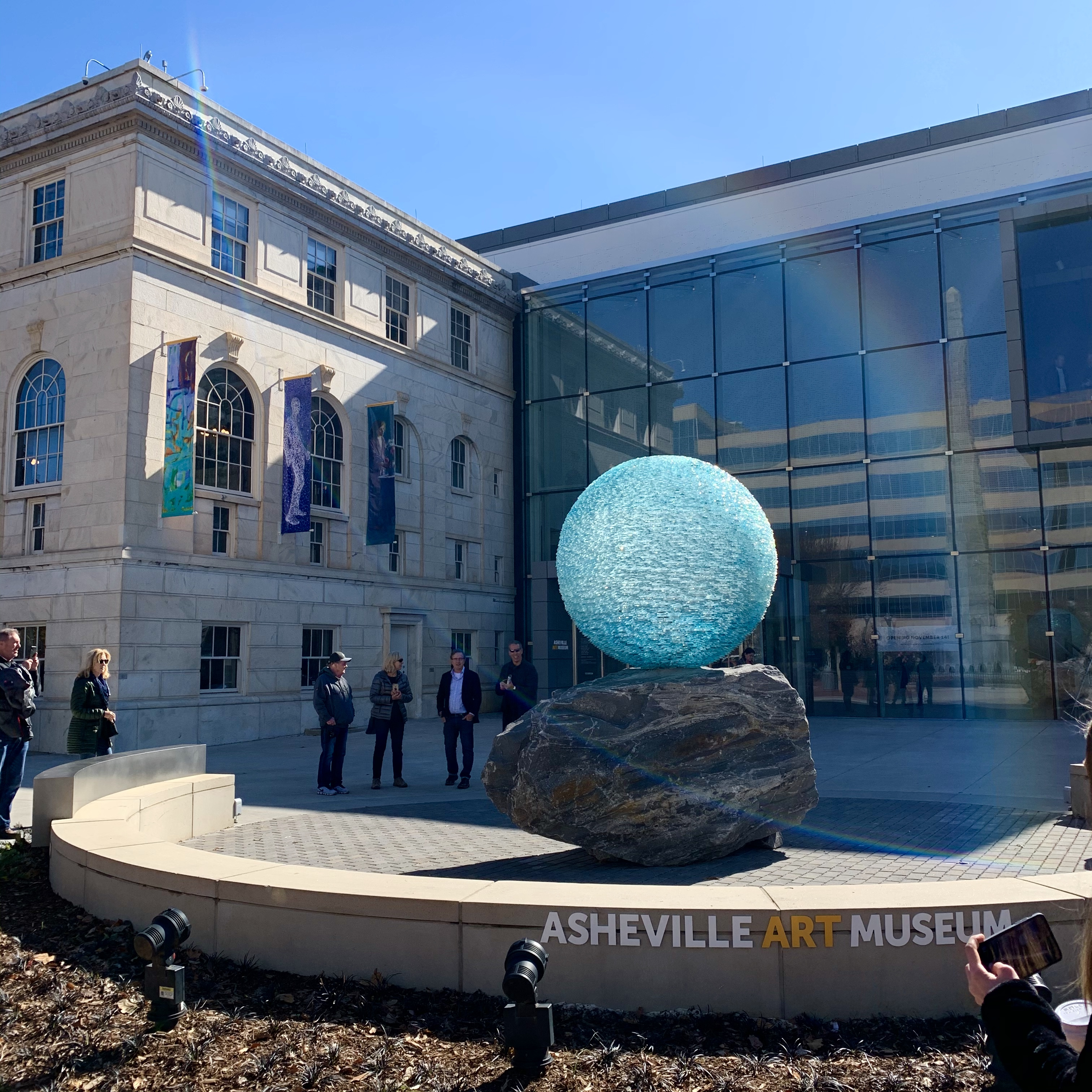
Reflections on Unity is the first public art installation at Asheville Art Museum, NC

=== 9/11 Memorial ===
Richardson conceived the Connecticut 9/11 memorial in Danbury as a twelve-foot glass column. The void within evokes the towers that no longer stand. The names of the 152 Connecticut victims are engraved on a sheet of glass that rises through the void. The memorial was dedicated on September 11, 2004.

=== Healing the World (Tikkun) series ===
Tikkun, inspired by the Hebrew phrase Tikkun olam, or "healing the world," was first shown at the Miami-Miami Beach Sculpture Biennale. These orbs, or hollow spheres, are constructed from layered arcs of fractured glass, fused together to form a crystalline whole. The bonding technology, together with precise calculations, permits the construction of very large forms. The orb at the Frost Art Museum Sculpture Park at Florida International University measures six feet in diameter and weighs approximately 5,000 pounds.

=== Ice Cave series ===
Richardson's background and interest in geology and climate change took him to Iceland, where he studied the ice beaches and glaciers, how the ocean carved the glaciers and the transmission of light. The ice sculpture series is based on these travels.
