= List of glass artists =

Entries organised by primary work location.

== Argentina ==
- Silvia Levenson (1957–)

== Australia ==
- Anita Aarons
- Nola Anderson
- Clare Belfrage (b. 1966)
- Nora Burden
- William Bustard
- Maureen Cahill
- Norman Carter
- Cobi Cockburn
- Amalie Sara Colquhoun
- George Dancey
- Mel Douglas
- Anne Dybka
- Tim Edwards
- Leonard French
- Marina Hanser
- David Taylor Kellock
- Rene Kulitja
- Jessica Loughlin
- Jenni Kemarre Martiniello
- Klaus Moje
- Cedar Prest
- John Radecki
- Sergio Redegalli (b. 1962)
- M. E. Aldrich Rope
- Yhonnie Scarce
- Zoja Trofimiuk (b. 1952)
- E. F. Troy
- H. L. Vosz
- Christian Waller
- Napier Waller

== Austria ==
- Ena Rottenberg (1893–1952)

== Belgium ==
- Pieter Coecke van Aelst
- Hendrick van Balen the Elder
- Jan de Beer (painter)
- Jean-Baptiste Capronnier
- Abraham van Diepenbeeck
- Dobbelaer
- Théodore-Gérard Hanssen
- Jan Huet
- Osterrath
- Jan Rombouts the Elder
- Daniël Theys (b. 1953)
- John of Utynam
- Eugeen Yoors

== Canada ==
- Sarah Hall (b. 1951)
- Catherine Labonté

== China ==
PRC & ROC

=== Hong Kong ===
- Carol Lee Mei Kuen (1963–)

=== Taiwan ===
- Loretta Yang (1952–)

== Czech Republic ==
- Jaroslava Brychtová (1924–2020)
- František Janák (1951–)
- Martin Janecký (1980–)
- Stanislav Libenský (1921–2002)
- Ivana Mašitová (1961–)
- Bořek Šípek (1949–2016)
- Jiřina Žertová (1932–)

== Estonia ==
- Meeli Kõiva (b. 1960)
- Ivo Lill (1953–2019)

== Finland ==
- Kerttu Nurminen (1943–)
- Timo Sarpaneva (1926–2006)
- Nanny Still (1926—2009)
- Oiva Toikka (1931–2019)
- Helena Tynell (1918–2016)

== France ==
- Claire Deleurme
- Émile Gallé (1846–1904)
- René Lalique (1860–1945)
- Louis Majorelle (1859–1926)
- Maurice Marinot (1882–1960)

== Germany ==
- Leopold Blaschka (1822–1895)
- Rudolf Blaschka (1857–1939)
- Erwin Eisch (1927–2022)
- Hans Godo Frabel (b. 1941)
- Nabo Gass (b. 1954)
- Thomas Schütte (b. 1954)

== Hong Kong ==
- Carol Lee Mei Kuen (b. 1963)

== Hungary ==
- Lili Árkayné Sztehló (1897–1959)
- Gyula Bajó (1907–1984)
- Júlia Báthory (1901–2000)

== Ireland ==
- Miroslav Havel (1922–2008)

== Israel ==
- Elinor Portnoy

== Italy ==
- Alfredo Barbini (1912–2007)
- Marietta Barovier (15th–century Venice)
- Silvia Levenson (b. 1957)
- Lino Tagliapietra (b. 1934)
- Paolo Venini (1895–1959)
- Silvio Vigliaturo (b. 1949)
- Hermonia Vivarini (16th–century Venice)

== Japan ==
- Keiko Mukaide (b. 1954)

== Lithuania ==
- Gražina Didžiūnaitytė (1940–2008)

== Mexico ==
- Einar de la Torre (1963–)
- Jamex de la Torre (1960–)

== The Netherlands ==
- Antoon Derkinderen (1859–1925)

== New Zealand ==
- Te Rongo Kirkwood (b. 1973)
- Tony Kuepfer (b. 1947)
- Elizabeth McClure (b. 1957)
- Ann Robinson (b. 1944)

== Norway ==
- Ulla–Mari Brantenberg (1947–)
- Ståle Kyllingstad (1903–1987)
- Arne Lindaas (1924–2011)
- Benny Motzfeldt (1909–1995)
- Oluf Tostrup (1842–1882)

== Panama ==
- Isabel de Obaldía (1957–)

== Philippines ==
- Marge Organo, contemporary glass artist

== Poland ==
- Zbigniew Horbowy (1935–2019)
- Marta Klonowska (1964–)
- Józef Mehoffer (1869–1946)
- Tomasz Urbanowicz (1959–)

== Russia ==
- Lyubov Savelyeva (1940–)

== Slovakia ==
- Zora Palová (1947–2025)

== Sweden ==
- Monica Edmondson (1963–)
- Vicke Lindstrand (1904–1983)

== United Kingdom ==
- Charles Bray (1922–2012)
- Freda Coleborn (1911–1965)
- Sam Herman (b. 1936, Mexico City)
- Jeremy Langford (b. 1956)
- Danny Lane (b. 1955)
- Peter Newsome (b. 1943)
- David Reekie (b. 1947)
- Salvador Ysart (1878–1955)
- Michael James Hunter (b. 1958)

== United States ==
- Irving Amen (1918–2011), stained glass
- Gary Beecham (b. 1955)
- Howard Ben Tré (1949–2020)
- Martin Blank (b. 1962)
- Granite Calimpong (b. 1982)
- Jean–Pierre Canlis (b. 1973)
- Frederick Carder (1863–1963)
- Ed Carpenter (b. 1946)
- Dale Chihuly (b. 1941)
- Deborah Czeresko (b. 1961)
- Dan Dailey (b. 1947)
- Fritz Dreisbach (b. 1941)
- Robert C. Fritz (1920–1986)
- Michael Glancy (1950–2020)
- Katherine Gray (b. 1965)
- Skowmon Hastanan (b. 1961)
- Frances Stewart Higgins (1912–2004)
- Michael Higgins (1908–1999)
- Paul Housberg (b. 1953)
- Michael Janis (b. 1959)
- Andi Kovel (b. 1969)
- Dominick Labino (1910–1987)
- Karen LaMonte (b. 1967)
- Helen Lee (artist) (b. 1978)
- Marvin Lipofsky (1938–2016)
- Harvey Littleton (1922–2013)
- John Littleton (b. 1957)
- Linda MacNeil (b. 1954)
- Dante Marioni (b. 1964)
- Richard Marquis (b. 1945)
- Concetta Mason (b. 1952)
- Josiah McElheny (b. 1966)
- Nancy Mee (b. 1951)
- Rick Mills (b. 1957)
- Carol Milne (b. 1962)
- Debora Moore (b. 1960)
- William Morris (b. 1957)
- Jay Musler (b. 1949)
- Willemina Ogterop (1881–1974)
- Andy Paiko (b. 1977)
- Jackie Pancari (1961–2021)
- Kit Paulson (b. 1981)
- Simon Pearce (born 1946 in Ireland)
- Flo Perkins (b. 1951)
- Seth Parks (b. 1984)
- Susan Plum (b. 1944)
- Kari Russell–Pool (b. 1967)
- Christopher Ries (b. 1952)
- Henry Richardson (b. 1961)
- Richard Ritter (b. 1940)
- Stephen Rolfe Powell (1951–2019)
- Marlene Rose (b. 1967)
- Ginny Ruffner (b. 1952)
- Colin Satterfield (b. 1979)
- Italo Scanga (1932–2001)
- Judith Schaechter (b. 1961)
- Joyce J. Scott (b. 1948)
- Mary Shaffer (b. 1947)
- Josh Simpson (b. 1949)
- Deanna Sirlin (b. 1958)
- Paul Joseph Stankard (b. 1943)
- Therman Statom (b. 1953)
- Susan Stinsmuehlen-Amend (b. 1948)
- Jack Storms (b. 1970)
- Tim Tate (b. 1960)
- Michael Taylor (b. 1943)
- Reji Thomas
- Cappy Thompson (b. 1952)
- Louis Comfort Tiffany (1848–1933)
- Erwin Timmers (b. 1964, in Amsterdam, Holland)
- Kate Vogel (b. 1956)
- Nikolas Weinstein (b. 1968)
- Anduriel Widmark (b. 1987)
- Karen Willenbrink–Johnsen, (b. 1960 Cincinnati, Ohio)
- Toots Zynsky (b. 1951)
