= Judy Jensen =

American artist (born 1953)

- Born: 1953 (age 72–73); Lamesa, Texas
- Known for: Artist
- Style: Reverse glass painting

Judy Jensen (born 1953) is an American artist who resides in Austin, Texas. She is best known for her reverse painting on glass, although she incorporates other mixed media into her glass pieces.

== Early life and education ==
Judy Jensen was born in 1953 in Lamesa, Texas.

She credits her undergraduate study in cultural and physical anthropology at the University of Texas (1971–1974) for many of the themes and recurring symbols in her work.

== Career and practice ==
When Jensen first became interested in glass, she began to create stained glass panels. She eventually recognized that painting would be less restrictive. Her early work features skeletons and fire, while snakes become important in later work. Jensen has said of her work, "My paintings are mystical – not very many things are."

From 1980 to 1985, Jensen was involved with the Renaissance Glass Company in Austin, Texas, a studio for flat glass artists founded by Susan Stinsmuehlen-Amend and Rodney Smith. There she experimented with a variety of painting techniques, including reverse glass painting. According to Nancy Bless, Jensen's works "lie somewhere between a collage and a collection."

As of 2015 Jensen is involved in a project replacing glass paintings, destroyed in an earthquake, in a 19th-century Buddhist temple in northwestern Thailand. These will depict the Vessantara and Siddhartha incarnations of Buddha. She was awarded a grant from the James H.W. Thompson Foundation in Bangkok in support of the project.

Jensen has exhibited widely. Solo venues include eight exhibits with New York's Heller Gallery; the Galveston Arts Center; and the Houston Center for Contemporary Crafts. Group exhibitions include Glass Today: American Studio Glass from Cleveland Collections, Cleveland Museum of Art, 1997; Pilchuck Exhibition, Seattle-Tacoma International Airport, 1996–1997; Gerald Peters Gallery in New York; the Smithsonian American Art Museum; Atlanta's High Museum; Tell Me a Story: Narrative Art in Clay and Glass, Eighth Triennale India, New Delhi, 1993; International Exposition of Sculpture Objects, and Functional Art: SOFA Chicago, 1996; Selections from The Chodorkoff Collection, The Detroit Institute of Arts, MI, 1991; and World Glass Now, Hokkaido Museum of Modern Art, Sapporo, Japan, 1994.

A National Endowment for the Arts Visual Arts Fellowship recipient (1986), Jensen's works are in numerous public and private collections, including the Royal Ontario Museum, the Smithsonian American Art Museum, the Los Angeles County Museum of Art, The Corning Museum of Glass, McDonald's Corporate Art Collection, and the Washington Art Consortium. For eight years, Judy Jensen worked almost exclusively on commissions.

== Museum and public collections ==
- Smithsonian American Art Museum, Washington, D.C.
- Royal Ontario Museum, Toronto, Canada
- Los Angeles County Museum of Art, Los Angeles, California
- Akron Art Museum, Akron, Ohio
- Corning Museum of Glass, Corning, New York
- The David Jacob Chodorkoff Collection
- Detroit Institute of Arts
- Racine Art Museum, Racine, Wisconsin
- Speed Art Museum, Louisville, Kentucky
- Austin-Bergstrom International Airport, Austin, Texas
- City of Austin Art in Public Places Offices, Austin, Texas
- McDonald's Corporate Collection, Chicago, Illinois
- SAFECO Corporate Collection, Seattle, Washington

== Awards and honors ==
- James H.W. Thompson Foundation Grant, 2013 (Thai foundation)
- Represented Austin/Bergstrom International Airport in MSN.com "Airports with the Best Art", 2009
- Curator's Award, Galveston Arts Center, 2007
- Best of Show, National Liberty Museum, Philadelphia, PA, 2004
- John H. Hauberg Fellowship Residency, Pilchuck Glass School, 2002
- Richard Diebenkorn Teaching Fellowship nominee, San Francisco Art Institute, 2000
- Most Original Austin Artist, Michael Barnes, Arts Editor, Austin American-Statesman, 1997
- Juror, Art Kauai, The Kauai Museum of Art, Hawaii, 1996
- Juror's Award, Austin Museum of Art, Texas, 1996
- Louis Comfort Tiffany Award nominee, 1993
- National Endowment for the Arts Visual Arts Fellowship Grant, 1986
- Juror's Award, Contemporary Arts Center, New Orleans, LA, 1985
- New Glass Reviews 19, 11, 8, 7, 6, & 5, annual competition documenting the 100 most innovative objects made in glass each year

== Selected publications ==
- Judy Jensen: Feverish, 2002, Houston Center for Contemporary Craft. OCLC Number: 51951219
- Sculpture, Glass, and American Museums, Martha Drexler Lynn, p. 166, University of Pennsylvania Press, 2005. ISBN 0-8122-3896-6, ISBN 978-0-8122-3896-9
- International Glass Art, Richard Yelle, pp. 161–162, Schiffer, 2003. ISBN 0-7643-1834-9, ISBN 978-0-7643-1834-4
- Women Working in Glass, Lucartha Kohler, pp. 161–162. Schiffer Pub., 2003. ISBN 0-7643-1807-1, ISBN 978-0-7643-1807-8
- Glass Art from UrbanGlass, Richard Yelle, p. 109, Schiffer Pub., 2000. ISBN 0-7643-1116-6, ISBN 978-0-7643-1116-1
- Contemporary Glass, Susanne Frantz, p. 28, H.N. Abrams, 1989. ISBN 0-8109-1038-1, ISBN 978-0-8109-1038-6
- "Judy Jensen: Tableaux in Reverse", American Craft, p. 42–45, cover illustration, Oct/Nov '93
- "The Glass Canvas", Glass Art, Volume 4, # 6, pp. 4–7, cover illustration, 1989
- "Judy Jensen: Dream Spaces", D. Cutler, New Work, #34, pp. 12–17, cover illustration, 1989
