= Bull's-eye window =

Bull's-eye window may refer to:

- Oeil-de-boeuf, an ornamental window with a circular frame
- A window made from crown glass
- Porthole, a circular nautical window
- Oculus (architecture), a skylight at the top of a dome

== See also ==
- Bullseye Glass, an American company
- Fresnel lens
