= Carol Lee =

Carol Lee may refer to:

== Full name ==
- Carol Ann Lee (born 1969), English writer
- Carol D. Lee (born 1945), American education researcher
- Carol Lee Mei Kuen (born 1963), Hong Kong contemporary artist
- Carol Young Suh Lee (born 2001), Northern Mariana Islander tennis player

== First name ==
- Carol Lee Flinders (born 1943), American writer
- Carol Lee Sanchez (born 1934), American poet and artist
- Carol Lee Scott (1942–2017), English actress

== See also ==
- Carol Leigh (1951–2022), American sex worker and activist
