= Steve Gower =

Australian Army officer

Major General Steve Gower AO
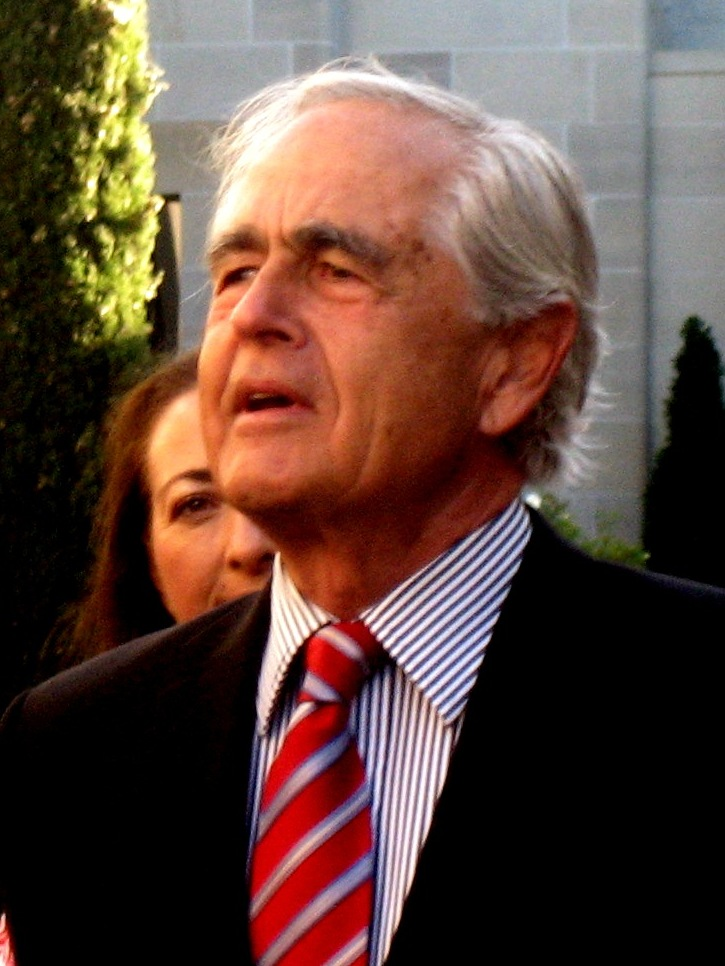
- Steve Gower at an announcement of additional government funding for the AWM in 2011

Director of the Australian War Memorial
- In office March 1996 – December 2012
- Preceded by: Brendon Kelson
- Succeeded by: Brendan Nelson

Personal details
- Born: Stephen Newman Gower; 10 June 1940 (age 86) Adelaide, South Australia
- Education: University of Adelaide

Military service
- Allegiance: Australia
- Branch/service: Australian Army
- Years of service: 1959–1996
- Rank: Major General
- Commands: Training Command (1995–96); 8th/12th Regiment, Royal Australian Artillery (1978–80)
- Battles/wars: Vietnam War
- Awards: Officer of the Order of Australia

Major General Stephen Newman Gower, AO (born 10 June 1940) is a retired Australian Army officer and former director of the Australian War Memorial (AWM). During his time in the Army he saw combat as an artillery forward observer during the Vietnam War in 1966 and 1967. He is also the author of the books Guns of the Regiment (1981) and Options for an Australian Defence Technological Strategy (1982).

== Early life ==
Gower was born on 10 June 1940 in Adelaide, South Australia, to Allan Martin and Agnes Fanny Gower. Educated at Unley High School and Prince Alfred College, he entered the Royal Military College, Duntroon in 1959. On graduation in 1961, he received a commission as a lieutenant in the Royal Australian Artillery. Gower wed Heather Eunice on 3 July 1965; the couple have one daughter.

== AWM Director ==
Gower was appointed the Director of the Australian War Memorial in 1996. He continued in this role until November 2011 when he took full-time carer's leave. Nola Anderson served as acting director until December 2012 when Brendan Nelson became the new director of the institution.

== Bibliography ==
=== Books ===
- Gower, Stephen (1981). Guns of the Regiment. Canberra: Australian War Memorial. ISBN 0642896887.
- Gower, Stephen (1982). Options for an Australian Defence Technological Strategy. Canberra: Strategic and Defence Studies Centre, Australian National University. ISBN 0867840595.
- Gower, Steve (2017). Rounds Complete: An Artillery Forward Observer in Vietnam. Warriewood, NSW: Big Sky Publishing. ISBN 978-1925520583.
- Gower, Steve (2019). The Australian War Memorial: A Century on From the Vision. Mile End, SA: Wakefield Press. ISBN 9781743056165.
