= Seth Parks =

Seth Parks (born August 21, 1984, in Waterville, Maine) is an American glass artist. Parks' work is displayed at such places as the Black Ensemble Theater Company (Chicago, IL); Buddha Sky Garden (Delray Beach, FL); and the Beverly Hills home of Saudi royalty.

== Career ==
After graduating high school in Augusta, Maine in 2003, Parks found a local glass artist giving lessons and he took a class. It was during that single class that Parks discovered his passion for glass and knew that's what he wanted his career to be. He soon signed up for more classes at Snow Farm, a craft school, in western Massachusetts. After taking several classes he decided to set up his own studio in Whitefield, Maine in 2004. In 2004–2005, he studied at The Studio of The Corning Museum of Glass with Italian glass maestros Elio Quarisa and Cesare Toffolo, William Gudenrath, and Jesse Kohl. He also studied with Jay Musler at Penland School of Crafts, and Sally Prach at Pilchuck Glass School.

=== Artistic focus ===
Parks' work has always been inspired by nature. In the early days, Parks focused on making intricate wine goblets with sea creatures, flowers and animals. From there he went on to create vases, perfume bottles, and marbles, many of which had frogs, flowers, and sea life. A couple of years after moving his studio to the Los Angeles area in 2007, Parks began designing and creating hand blown glass chandeliers, pendants, wall sconces and sculptures. With chandelier names like Anemone and Bella Fiore, Parks has stayed true to his nature themes.
