= Paul Housberg =

American glass artist

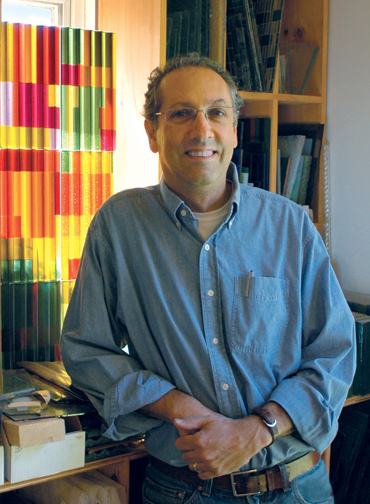
- Born: January 31, 1953 (age 73); New York City, New York
- Education: Rhode Island School of Design
- Known for: Glass art, architectural installations
- Awards: Fulbright Scholar, France

Paul Housberg (born January 31, 1953) is an American glass artist recognized for his use of fused and kiln formed glass as an architectural medium. He currently resides in Jamestown, Rhode Island.

== Education and early career ==
Housberg received his Bachelor of Fine Arts (1975) and Master of Fine Arts (1979) degrees from Rhode Island School of Design where he has also served as an instructor at various times during 1978–1997.

While he was at RISD, Housberg studied glass under artist Dale Chihuly and in 1972, a year after it was founded, he studied at the Pilchuck Glass School in Stanwood, Washington.

Early in his career, Housberg studied painting, but was drawn to glass for its atmospheric color. He began working in stained glass but eventually moved to work in kiln formed glass as an alternative to the lead structure of traditional stained glass.

After his graduate work at RISD, he studied in England with Patrick Reyntiens, a pioneer in contemporary stained glass and the author of The Technique of Stained Glass. This experience was made possible by a scholarship he received from the New York Experimental Glass Workshop, now known as Urban Glass in Brooklyn, New York.

In 1986, as a Fulbright Scholar, Housberg worked at the International Center for Glass Research (CIRVA) in Marseille, France. He spent his time exploring various glass techniques such as fusing, slumping, and kiln-casting. This endeavor was supported in part by a donation of glass from Bullseye Glass in Portland, Oregon, a pioneer in the manufacturing of fusible glass.

== Work ==
Housberg is noted for his inventive applications of glassworking technologies in architectural settings. Central to his work are the tactile qualities of glass and the expression of its materiality.

Although Housberg continues to explore and implement multiple techniques in his work, he is best known for his architectural installations consisting of colorful kilnformed tiles with a sawtooth relief.

Housberg's work was profiled in the multimedia documentary series, NetWorks Rhode Island, in 2016.

== Architectural installations ==
Housberg's first large architectural commission was in 1990 from The Dreyfus Corporation for the MetLife Building in New York City. This work was done with the architecture firm Swanke Hayden Connell Ltd. of New York and incorporated cast glass fabricated in conjunction with Fenton Art Glass. The 8'h x 21'w wall is of Dreyfus's iconic lion, standing in tall grass.

His second major commission was in 1993 for Pfizer Inc in Groton, CT where he worked with the architectural firm CUH2A Inc., Princeton, NJ. The work was for four 12’h x 11’w walls, each depicting a season. Four Seasons is made of cast and laminated glass.

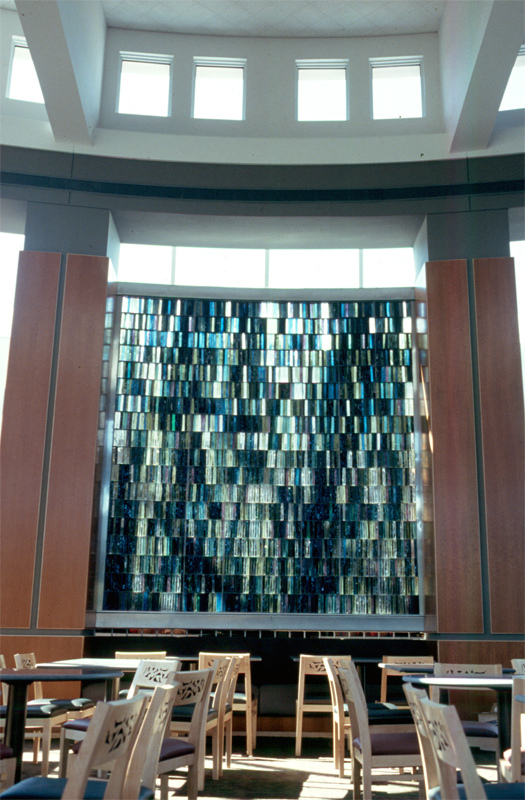
"Four Seasons", winter wall, Pfizer, Groton, CT

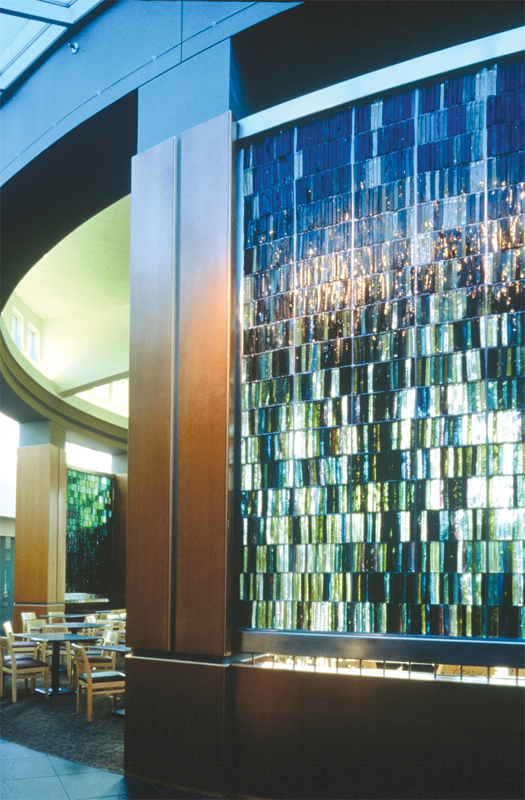
"Four Seasons", spring and winter walls, Pfizer, Groton, CT

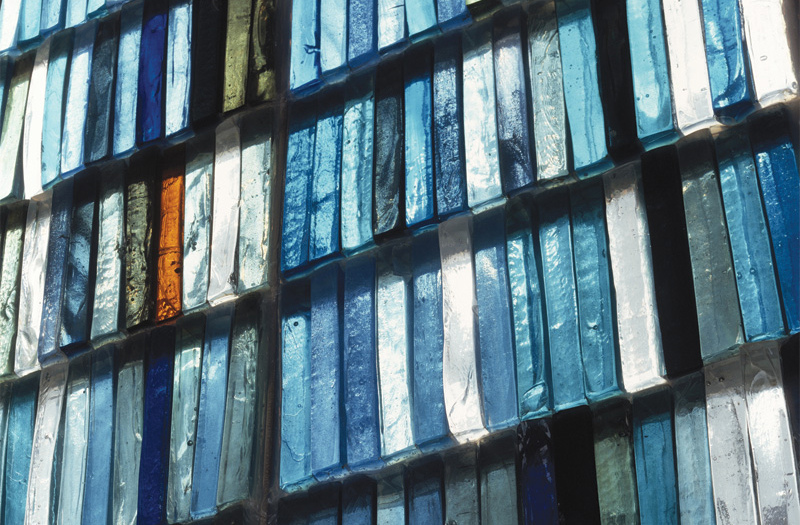
"Four Seasons", summer detail, Pfizer, Groton, CT

His third major installation was completed in 1999 at the William J. Nealon Federal Building and U.S. Courthouse Annex in Scranton, PA designed by Bohlin Cywinski Jackson, Wilkes-Barre, PA. This 14’h x 40’w work was commissioned by the U.S. General Services Administration Art in Architecture Program.

In 2001, Housberg completed his first installation to use his signature sawtooth glass tiles. The 12’h x 9’w backlit, kilnformed glass wall is in the lobby of The Peninsula Chicago.

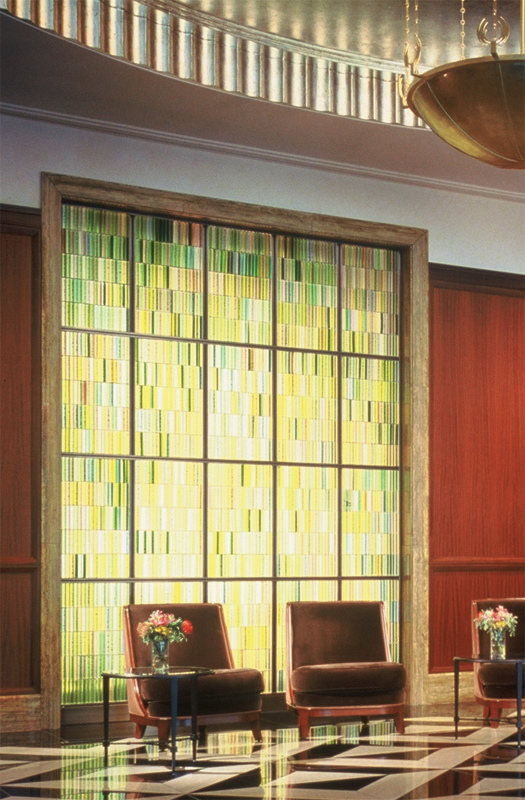
The Peninsula Chicago Hotel, Chicago, IL

In 2009, Housberg completed a large installation at the California State Teachers’ Retirement System (CalSTRS) building designed by HOK San Francisco. This particular work was fabricated in collaboration with Derix Glass Studio and Lamberts Glas. The piece features tiles composed of handblown glass treated with vitreous enamels and laminated to mirror. The tiles are mounted to four walls in the lobby.

In 2010, Housberg completed a public art series in Rhode Island at the Governor Philip W. Noel Judicial Complex.

== Select public art commissions ==
- The Governor Philip W. Noel Judicial Complex Warwick, RI, 2010. Architect: HOK, NY
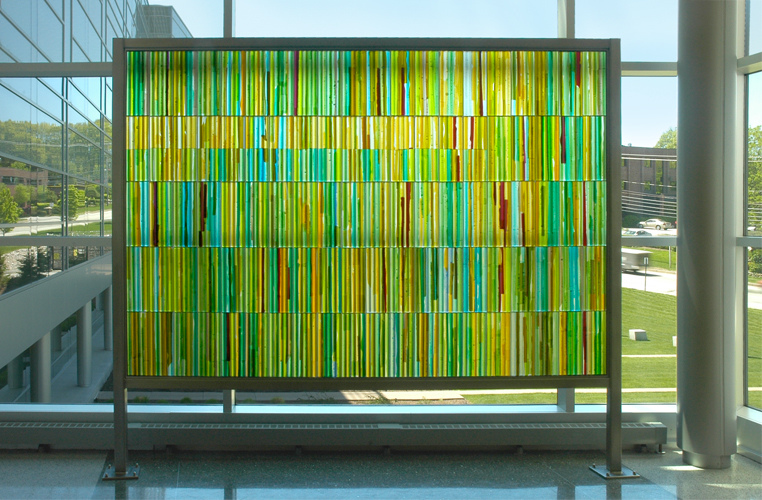
"Wetland Rapture", The Governor Philip W. Noel Judicial Complex, Warwick, RI

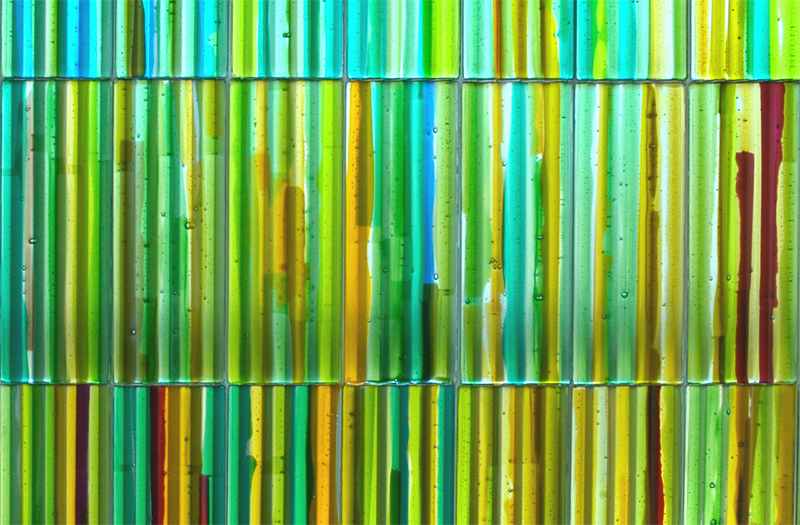
"Wetland Rapture", detail, The Governor Philip W. Noel Judicial Complex, Warwick, RI
- Naugatuck Valley Community College Waterbury, CT, 2008. Architect: Amenta/Emma Architects
- University of Utah Marriott Library Salt Lake City, UT, 2008. Interior Architect: MJSAA Architects
- Logan International Gateway Massachusetts Port Authority, 2007. Architect: Skidmore, Owings & Merrill, LLP
- Tooele Third District Court Utah Arts Council, 2007. Architect: MHTN Architects
- William J. Nealon Federal Building and U.S. Courthouse, Scranton, PA, 1999. Architect: Bohlin Cywinski Jackson
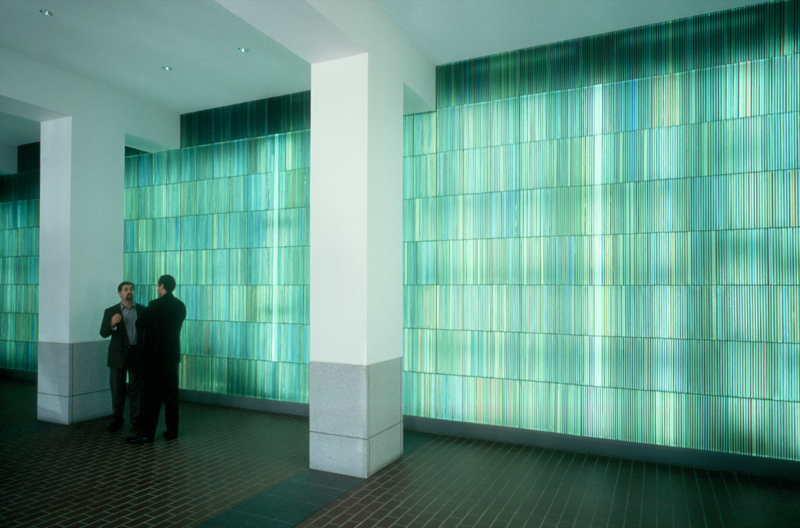
"Lightfall", William J. Nealon Federal Building and U.S. Courthouse, Scranton, PA
- Alpenglow Elementary School Eagle River, AK, Percent for Art, 1995
- Montgomery County Government Art in Public Architecture, Bethesda, MD, Little Falls Community Library, 1991

== Select private installations ==
- Water Walk, Spaulding Rehabilitation Hospital Boston, MA, 2013. Architect: Perkins+Will
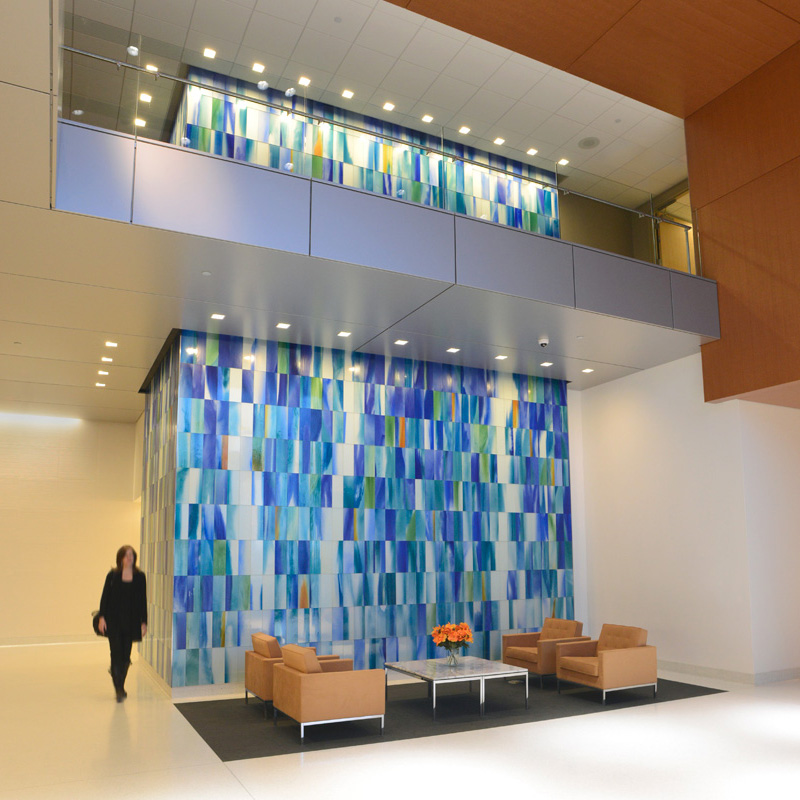
Water Walk, painted glass installation at Spaulding Rehabilitation Hospital

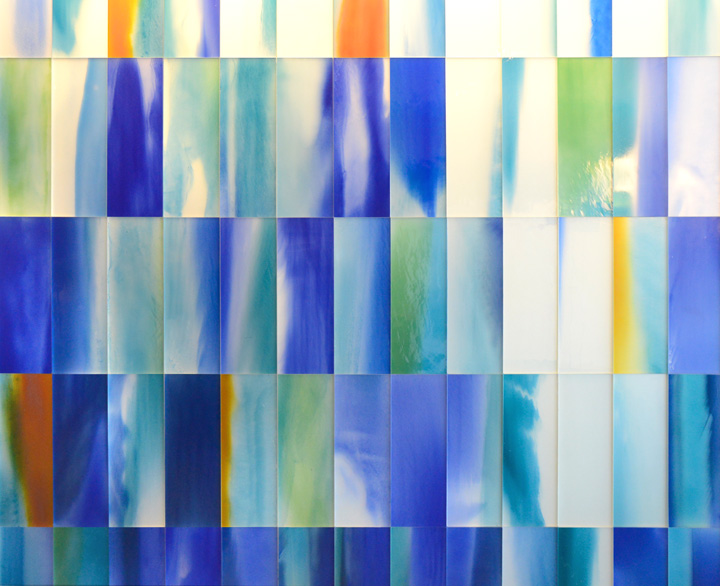
Water Walk (detail)
- Frick Chemistry Lab, Princeton University Princeton, NJ, 2010. Architect: Hopkins Architects, London in collaboration with Payette Associates, Boston
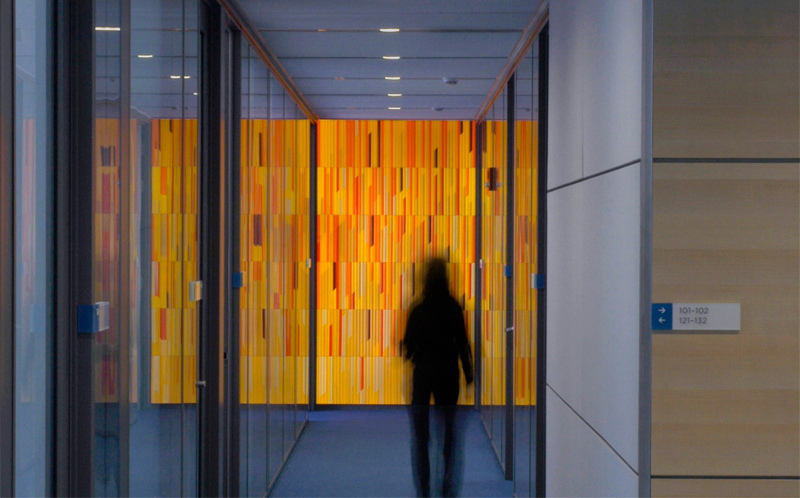
Frick Chemistry Building, Princeton University, Princeton, NJ. First floor north.

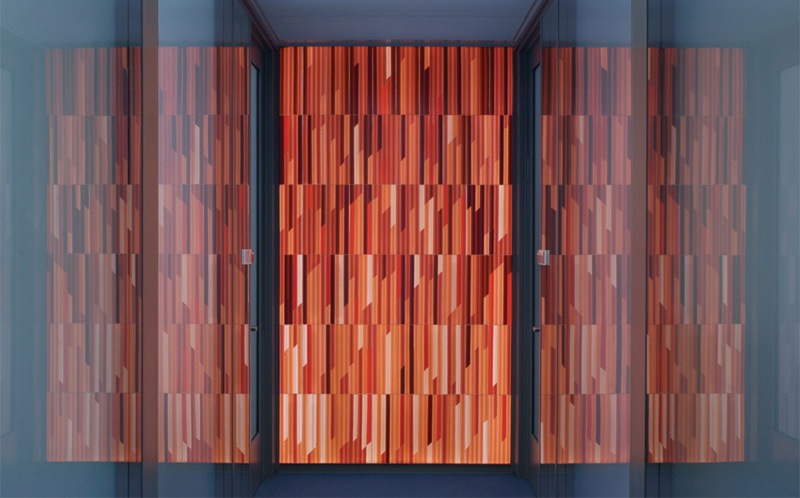
Frick Chemistry Building, Princeton University, Princeton, NJ. One of the six installations located at the north and south ends of the central corridor of the office wing of the building. Third floor south.
- The New York Helmsley Hotel New York, NY, 2010. Designer: J/Brice International
- California State Teachers’ Retirement System (CalSTRS) Sacramento, CA, 2009. Architect: HOK
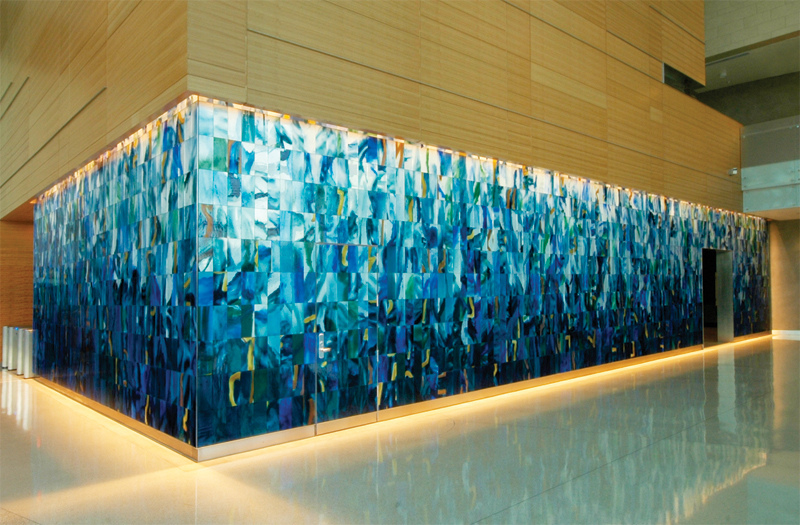
CalSTRS Headquarters, West Sacramento, CA

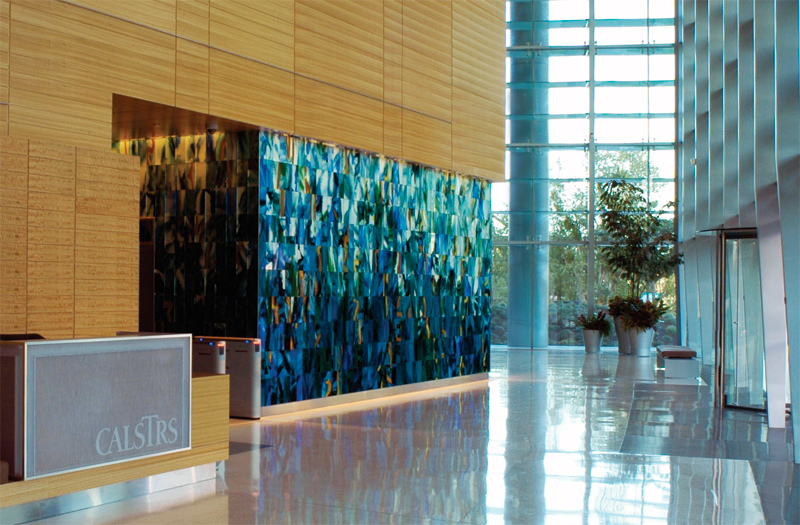
CalSTRS Headquarters, West Sacramento, CA
- Silver Towers New York City, NY, 2009. Architect: Costas Kondylis and Partners
- Women & Infants Hospital Providence, RI, 2009. Architect: Anshen + Allen
- Florida Hospital Orlando, FL, 2008. Architect: Hunton Brady Architects
- Ink 48 Hotel New York, NY, 2008. Interior Architect: Rockwell Group
- Radisson Lexington New York, NY, 2007. Designer: Stonehill and Taylor
- Children's Specialized Hospital New Brunswick, NJ, 2007. Architect: HKS; Interior Architect: Granary Associates
- GTECH Providence, RI, 2006. Architect: Spagnolo Gisness & Associates
- California Pacific Medical Center San Francisco, CA, 2005. Architect: SMWM
- Ernst & Young Boston, MA, 2005. Architect: Gensler
- Geoffrey & Keenie Fieger residence Bloomfield Hills, MI 2004
- St. Regis Resort Aspen, CO, 2004
- Marriott Hotel Richmond, VA, 2003
- Temple Habonim Barrington, RI, 2003
- Graves 601 Hotel, Minneapolis, MN, 2003. Designer: Yabu Pushelberg
- The Peninsula Hotel Chicago, IL, 2001. Designer: BAMO
- Integrative Center for Health Pawtucket, RI, 2000
- Pfizer Inc. Groton, CT, 1993. Architect: CUH2A Inc
- The Dreyfus Corporation New York, NY, 1990. Architect: Swanke Hayden Connell Ltd.

== Publications ==
Housberg's work has been published in The New Glass Review and in the book Luxury Hotels America By Martin Nicholas Kunz, Patrice Farameh, Patricia Massó.

His work was also featured in Stephen Knapp's The Art of Glass: Integrating Architecture and Glass
