= William J. Nealon Federal Building and United States Courthouse =

Historic courthouse in Scranton, Pennsylvania

Coordinates: 41.4086°N 75.6629°W

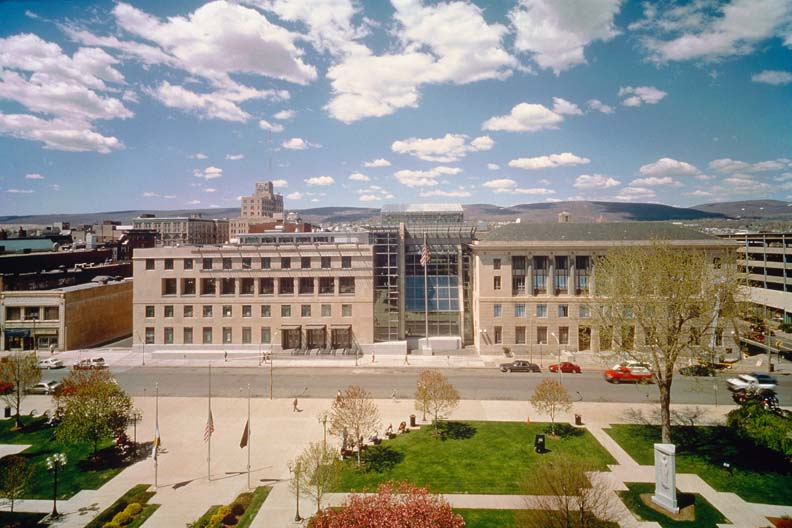

The William J. Nealon Federal Building and United States Courthouse is a courthouse of the United States District Court for the Middle District of Pennsylvania, located in Scranton, Pennsylvania. It was completed in 1931, and was listed on the National Register of Historic Places in 2018.

== Building history ==
Scranton's first post office opened in 1811, but utilized rented space until the city's first federally owned post office building was erected in 1894. The Second Empire-style building soon proved to be too small for the city's needs, an issue compounded by the establishment of the Middle District Federal Court. Following numerous efforts to obtain funding for a new building, the federal government appropriated $2.5 million in 1926. The 1894 building was demolished in 1930. In 1929, chief of architectural design Louis A. Simon at the Office of the Supervising Architect under James A. Wetmore, completed plans for a new building on the site.

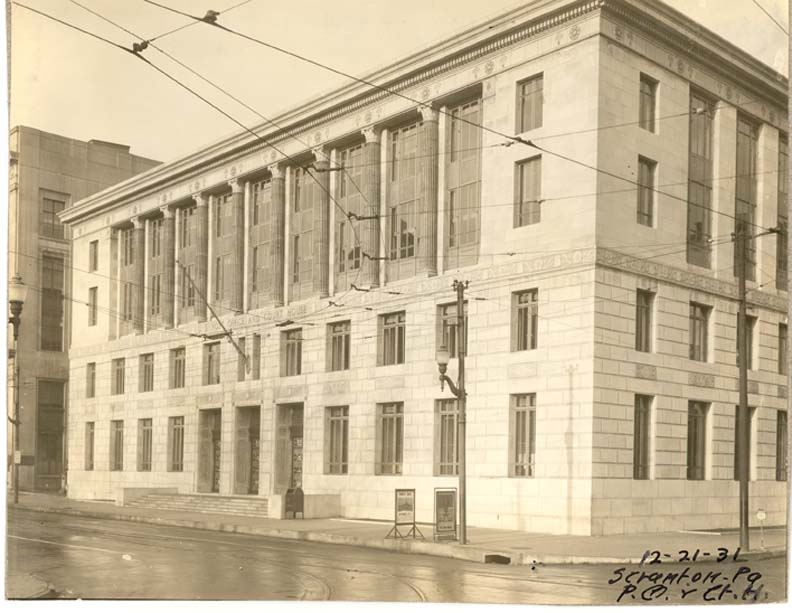
The building as it stood in 1931.

With N.P. Severin Company serving as the general contractor, groundbreaking occurred on May 20, 1930. The new federal building was completed the following year at a cost of $1,004,000, with dedication ceremonies taking place on October 19, 1931. In 1981, the United States Postal Service sold the building to the U.S. General Services Administration (GSA) and moved its main office to a new site, though it maintains a small branch in the building. In 1985, GSA began a $4.3 million rehabilitation of damaged historic materials such as doors, light fixtures, and interior finishes. A glass-and-steel atrium and annex were added in 1999. The annex received several awards, including a GSA Design Award Architecture Citation and a Pennsylvania AIA Merit Award.

In 1999, the building was renamed in honor of William J. Nealon, chief judge of the U.S. District Court for the Middle District of Pennsylvania from 1976 to 1989. The building is eligible for listing in the National Register of Historic Places.

== Architecture ==
The building is a four-story, Art Deco-influenced Neoclassical building executed in limestone and brick with a granite base, green serpentine columns, and terracotta with polychrome accents. Characteristics of Neoclassical style include symmetry, smooth stone surfaces, and colonnades. Art Deco influences are apparent in polychrome (multicolored) ornamental details, low-relief geometrical designs, and decorative forms based on nature.

The elevations facing Washington and Linden Avenues are bilaterally symmetrical with the more ornamental Washington Avenue facade facing Courthouse Square. These elevations are sheathed in a smooth-dressed granite base up to the first story, and limestone blocks from the second to the fourth story. Most of the Washington Avenue facade is recessed at the third and fourth floors with engaged green serpentine columns highlighted by terracotta Corinthian capitals. The entire composition is topped by a polychrome terra-cotta entablature. Metal spandrel panels are below the third-story windows and marble spandrels below the fourth-story windows. Three bronze doors with bronze and cast aluminum grills comprise the entrances at Washington and Linden Avenues.

The entrances on Washington Avenue lead to the elevator lobby, which is the main entrance to the court facilities on the fourth floor. The entry on the Linden Avenue facade leads to the post office lobby on the ground floor. Historic materials include marble, bronze, clay tile, simulated stone, cast iron, oak detailing, and decorative stencils.

Two original courtrooms are on the fourth floor. Each has oak-paneled wainscoting capped by a carved frieze at door height, interrupted by windows and the wall behind the judge's bench. In Courtroom No. 1, behind the judge's bench is a curtained area with oak columns and an entablature with a mural, titled Justice with Peace and Prosperity (artist unknown), installed soon after the building was completed. In Courtroom No. 2, there is a marble panel with bronze grill trim and a drapery surround behind the judge's bench. The plaster ceilings feature a plaster cornice and plaster bands dividing the ceiling into nine panels.

Built in 1999, the annex is a four-story, steel-reinforced masonry building with a facade clad in limestone to match the historic courthouse building. Designed by the architecture and planning firm, Bohlin Cywinski Jackson in conjunction with hemmler + camayd architects, the annex fronts on Washington Avenue. Although its restrained design features no overt references to the classical detailing of the 1931 building, its materials and proportions are similar. The facade is divided into upper and lower halves, but in lieu of a colonnade, the upper half is embellished by a row of large, deeply set windows.

The annex includes two new courtrooms on the fourth floor, and space for additional courtrooms on the second floor. The courtrooms are notable for their spatial design. Each courtroom is organized along an implied axis connecting the jury deliberation room, judge's bench, courtroom entrance, and major features in the public atrium. Fully accessible witness and jury boxes are set to one side. Clerestory windows above the jury box introduce daylight into the courtrooms.

A glass-and-steel atrium connects the 1931 building to the 1999 annex. The atrium is highlighted by an art glass installation by artist Paul Housberg, which was commissioned under GSA's Art in Architecture program. The program empowers the nation's leading artists to create new works of art for federal buildings. The artist worked with GSA staff, project architects, and the community to create artwork integrated into the building's design. Housberg's colored glass wall, entitled Lightfall, consists of backlit twelve-inch by twenty-inch glass blocks.

== History ==
- 1930-1931: Building constructed
- 1981: GSA purchases building from U.S. Postal Service and begins restoration
- 1999: New atrium and annex constructed
- 1999: Building renamed in honor of Judge William J. Nealon

== Building facts ==
- Location: 235 North Washington Avenue
- Architects: James A. Wetmore; Bohlin Cywinski Jackson and hemmler + camayd architects
- Construction Dates: 1930-1931; 1999
- Architectural Style: Neoclassical with Art Deco influences; Contemporary (annex)
- Landmark Status: Listed on the National Register of Historic Places
- Primary Materials: Limestone, brick, terracotta, and granite; steel and glass atrium
- Prominent Features: Green serpentine stone columns; Decorative terracotta trim with polychrome detailing; Original bronze, marble, and iron interior finishes; Atrium art glass installation
