= Klaus Moje =

German–Australian glass artist

- Born: 5 October 1936; Hamburg, Germany
- Died: 24 September 2016 (aged 79); Canberra, Australia
- Known for: Glass art
- Notable work: Portland Panels

Klaus Moje AO (5 October 1936 – 24 September 2016) was a German born, Australian glass artist and educator. Moje was the founding workshop head of the Australian National University (ANU) School of Art Glass Workshop in Canberra, Australia.

== Biography ==
=== Early life ===
Klaus Moje was born in 1936 in Germany to a family of glass workers who specialised in providing bevelled and decorated glass for things such as mirrors and shelving. Moje became a journeyman glass cutter and worked in his family's shop until he received a scholarship to study glass art in Rheinbach and then in Hadamar. After a brief time as a German folk singer, Moje opened a stained glass studio with Isgard Moje-Wohlgemuth. Moje made his first entry into the glass art world with carved and polished glass sculptures. Although these pieces garnered him quite a bit of attention, he abandoned the cut glass work when he discovered a caché of colourful glass canes that were used to make buttons for the garment industry.

=== Fused Glass ===
Around the year 1975, Moje began cutting the rods into thin wafers or strips and fusing them together in a kiln. The pieces would then be cut again and re-fused to create rhythmic patterns of vibrant colour. In 1976, Moje returned to Hamburg after a short time living in Danzinger Strasse. Moje became a founding member of Galerie der Kunsthandwerker and in 1978 through 1982 he was a member of the Jury of Arbeitsgemeinschaft des Deutschen Kunsthandwerks. Meanwhile, Moje continued working with the glass rods. The process was fraught with failure caused by the material. Many of the glass colours were incompatible with each other, causing the work to break in the kiln or even after the firing process had finished. The work that did survive was often heavily devitrified. Moje's background as a glass cutter came to the fore as he had to carve away the contaminated surface to reveal the colour he desired.

=== Pilchuck ===
In 1979, Moje was invited to be a guest lecturer at the Pilchuck Glass School in Stanwood, Washington. The school, started by Dale Chihuly, was geared mainly toward glassblowing, but Moje gave a talk about his recent fused glass works. He discussed the issues he was having with the material and lamented the fact that the factory that had been making the rods was planning to cease production when the master who knew the formula to make them retired. Moje was looking for a glass manufacturer that could make a wide palette of coloured glass but also help with the incompatibility and devitrification problems that he was experiencing. One of his students at Pilchuck was Boyce Lundstrom.

=== Bullseye ===
A few years before Moje's visit to Pilchuck, Boyce Lundstrom and his partner Dan Schwoerer had started making coloured glass for the growing stained glass market. Based in Portland, Oregon, Bullseye Glass was the "day job" for the self-described "hippy glassblowers." Schwoerer and Lundstrom were intrigued by the work that Moje was producing and invited him to the factory (really just a house in SE Portland). During that visit, Schwoerer and Lundstrom promised Moje that they would develop a glass specifically for fusing. Two years later a box of glass arrived at Moje's doorstep.

=== An Invitation ===
Moje had barely been able to crack the crate open when he had to pack up his entire studio and move to Australia. Udo Selbach, the director of the Canberra School of Art, invited Moje to set up a glass program and in 1982 Moje moved to Australia with his partner Brigitte Enders. The workshop that Moje created at Canberra was unlike any glass workshop at that time. Instead of focusing on glassblowing, Moje centred the program around fusing and coldworking techniques. The program he developed was based on the Bauhaus model that was familiar to Moje from his early education. Unlike many programs that had de-emphasised skill in favour of conceptual thinking, Moje created a program that had a rigorous technical core.

=== Australia ===
After Moje was settled into his new home and his new role as head of the glass program, he started to experiment with the Bullseye glass that had arrived just before he moved. Glass, which previously had so many limitations, became wide open. The compatible glass that Bullseye supplied was able to be fused much more reliably. The intricacy and vibrance of Moje's work at the time demonstrates the effect of his close collaboration with Bullseye and Dan Schwoerer in particular. The glass manufactured in Portland, Oregon by Bullseye Glass Company, became the standard for both Canberra's glass program and Moje's personal artistic practice. Moje and Bullseye continued to collaborate. Moje pushed the material in more expressively painterly ways and Bullseye met those challenges by developing new colours with more capabilities. This collaboration culminated in 2007 with a series of panels that were created as the centerpiece for Moje's retrospective exhibition at the Portland Art Museum.

In 2006, Moje was made an honorary Officer of the Order of Australia for service to the visual arts as a glass artist.

=== Portland Panels ===
Bruce Guenther, Portland Art Museum's chief curator, was looking for a new piece to become a major focal point for a retrospective of Moje's work, the resulting work was a suite of four panels "Choreographed Geometry," also known as the "Portland Panels." This work was created at the Bullseye Factory and was constructed from thousands of hand cut strips of glass, each panel measures 6 × 4 feet.

The retrospective at the Portland Art Museum was quickly followed in 2009 by the retrospective Klaus Moje: Painting with Glass at the Museum of Arts and Design in New York City. The Portland Panels were acquired in 2015 by the Corning Museum of Glass, and are on permanent display there.

=== Later life and death ===
Moje continued to push his aesthetic and conceptual boundaries. Retired from teaching, Moje devoted all of his time to his studio practice. He maintained his close relationship with Bullseye over the years. He died in Canberra on 24 September 2016.

In January 2022 a book by Nola Anderson covering Moje's career was published. It is entitled Glass: The Life and Art of Klaus Moje, and Moje worked on it with Anderson prior to his death.

== Galleries ==
Bullseye Projects, Portland, Oregon (formerly Bullseye Gallery)
