= Marlene Rose =

American glass sculptor (born 1967)

- Born: December 5, 1967 (age 58)
- Education: Tulane University, New Orleans, Louisiana; California College of Arts and Crafts, Oakland, California
- Occupation: Glass artist
- Awards: National Endowment for the Arts grant, 2007

Marlene Rose (born December 5, 1967) is an American glass sculptor. She specializes in sandcast glass work, a method inspired by bronze casting, and is a pioneer of the glass art equivalent.

== Early life and education ==
Rose graduated from Tulane University, acquiring a Bachelor of Fine Arts with Honors in Glass. She then acquired a Master of Fine Arts at the California College of Arts and Crafts. She also studied at the Pilchuck Glass School founded by Dale Chihuly and Anne Gould Hauberg.

As she was starting her glass artistry, Rose recalls seeing many functional pieces, such as kitchenware, made from glass and thinking, “There wasn’t a statement. There wasn’t an expression, a communication, with this shape.” This helped further actualize her eventual predilection toward glass sculpture. Rose is among the first artists to use traditional bronze casting methods with glass, having used and developed such practices since the 1980s.

== Career ==
In 2007, Rose was awarded a National Endowment for the Arts grant.

In 2016, Rose opened the Marlene Rose Gallery in Clearwater, Florida, which is the first gallery created for the sole purpose of exhibiting her artwork.

On September 29, 2019, Rose was featured on a segment of CBS News Sunday Morning titled "Glass Cast in Sand", where she was interviewed by Lee Cowan.

== Technique ==
Rose's usual glass-making technique is inspired by bronze casting. Rose pours molten glass – which she refers to as "lava" – into a sand mold, then waits upwards of six days for her pieces to cool in the oven before removing the piece from the mold.

Rose is strongly inspired by artistic traditions and past civilizations of African and Asian origin. Frequent motifs in her sculptures include Buddha heads and butterflies.

== Personal ==
She currently resides in Clearwater, Florida, where her gallery is based.

She is married to architect Thomas Coates.

== Selected works ==
- 2008: "Crimson Door": cast glass and wrought iron
- 2011: "Buddha Wall": glass, steel, and copper
- 2011: "Merlot Compass Rose Butterfly": sandcast glass, steel, copper
- 2014: "Electric Blue Lady Cecile": sandcast steel, copper
- 2015: "Polka Dot Buddha": sandcast glass, steel
- 2016: "Bearded Boy": sandcast glass, steel
- 2016: "Large Festival Mask": sandcast glass, steel
- 2016: "Merlot Bell with Torii": sandcast glass, steel
- 2016: "Rose Cherry Blossom": sandcast glass, steel
- 2017: "Fountain Buddha": sandcast glass
- 2020: "Air to Water Buddha": sandcast glass, steel
- 2020: "Aqua O With Roofing Nails": sandcast glass
- 2020: "Double Pointy Bell Tower": sandcast glass, steel

== Exhibitions ==
- January 10 to February 23, 2014: Morean Arts Center, "Keep It Glassy, St. Pete!: Glass in the Sunshine City", Tampa, Florida
- 2015: Arvada Center for the Arts and Humanities, "Fired: Glass", Arvada, Colorado
- 2019: Fort Wayne Museum of Art, Marlene Rose: Cultural Blueprints, Fort Wayne, Indiana
- National Gallery of Foreign Art, Sofia, Bulgaria
