= Dan Dailey (glass artist) =

American artist (born 1947)

Dan Owen Dailey
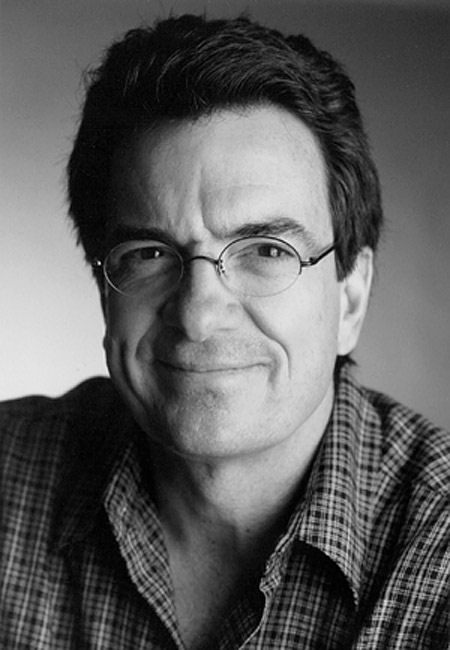
- Born: February 4, 1947 (age 79); Philadelphia, Pennsylvania, U.S.
- Education: University of the Arts, Rhode Island School of Design
- Known for: Glass sculpture
- Movement: Modernism, Materialism
- Spouse: Linda MacNeil
- Children: 2
- Website: www.dandailey.com

Dan Owen Dailey (born February 4, 1947) is an American artist and educator known for his work in glass sculpture. His work combines glass with metal and often incorporates light and narrative elements, and he is associated with the studio glass movement. His work is held in major public collections. He is professor emeritus at the Massachusetts College of Art and Design, where he founded the glass program.

== Early life and education ==
Dan Dailey was born on February 4, 1947, in Philadelphia, Pennsylvania. He attended the Philadelphia College of Art (BFA 1969), where he was introduced to glass and the Rhode Island School of Design (MFA 1972), where he studied with Dale Chihuly. and was Chihuly’s first graduate student. From 1972 to 1973, he was awarded a Fulbright Fellowship to study glass at the Venini glass Factory in Murano, Italy.

== Career ==
In 1973, Dailey joined the faculty of the Massachusetts College of Art and Design in Boston, where he founded the glass program. He is currently professor emeritus. He also taught at institutions including Pilchuck Glass School and worked with the Massachusetts Institute of Technology Center for Advanced Visual Studies, where he explored the use of light in glass and mixed-media work.

Since the 1970s, Dailey has participated in numerous group exhibitions and has had many solo shows.

In addition to studio work, he collaborated with glass manufacturers including Daum, Steuben Glass Works, and Fenton Art Glass Company. Since the 1970s, his work has been widely exhibited in solo and group exhibitions.

== Works and style ==
Dailey’s work developed from traditional studio glass into more complex sculptural forms that combine glass with metal and light. His work includes vessels, figurative sculpture, and wall reliefs, incorporating narrative or symbolic elements and drawing on themes from everyday life. Human figures, birds, and animals appear frequently as subject matter.

He often combines glass with other materials, altering or piercing its surface to highlight the contrast between fragility and strength. Many works use bright color and flat, graphic forms, and often include humor linked to his early interest in cartooning.

== Collections and recognition ==
Dailey’s work is held in numerous public collections, including the Metropolitan Museum of Art, the Smithsonian American Art Museum (Renwick Gallery), and the Corning Museum of Glass.

Dailey was elected a Fellow of the American Craft Council in 1998 and has received awards including the Libenský Award (2000) and the Masters of the Medium Award from the James Renwick Alliance (2001).

== Personal life ==
Dailey lives and works in New Hampshire. He is married to artist, Linda MacNeil, who works with glass and metal.

== Gallery ==
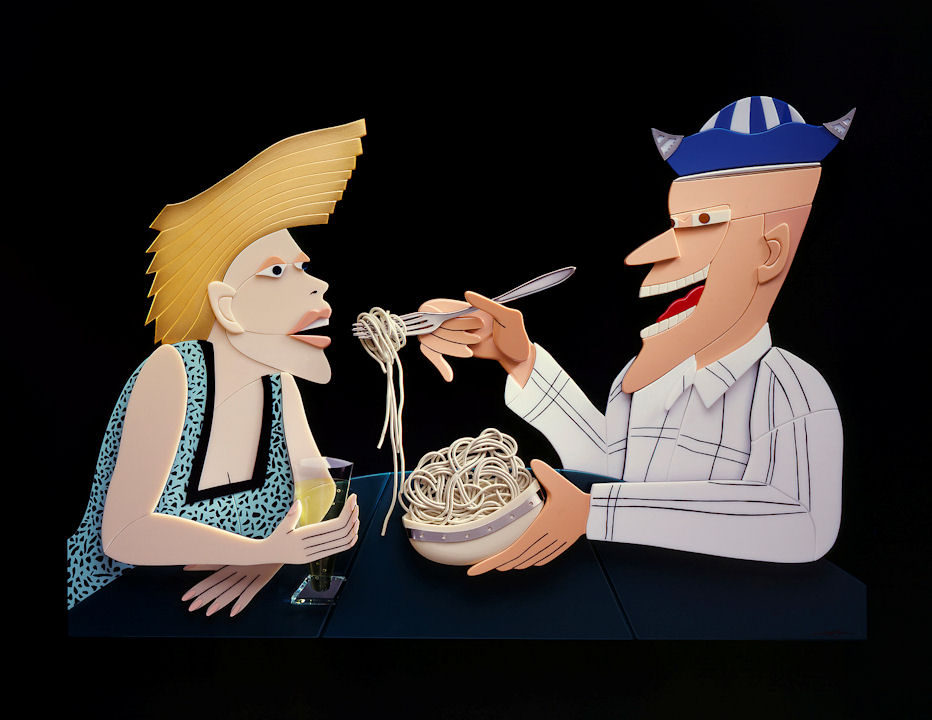
1987 Romance, Huntington Museum of Art

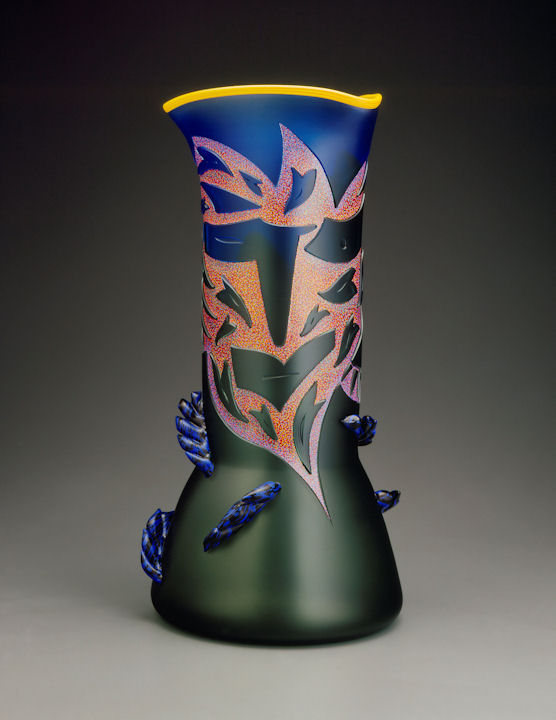
Hawk and Dove Man, Currier Museum of Art

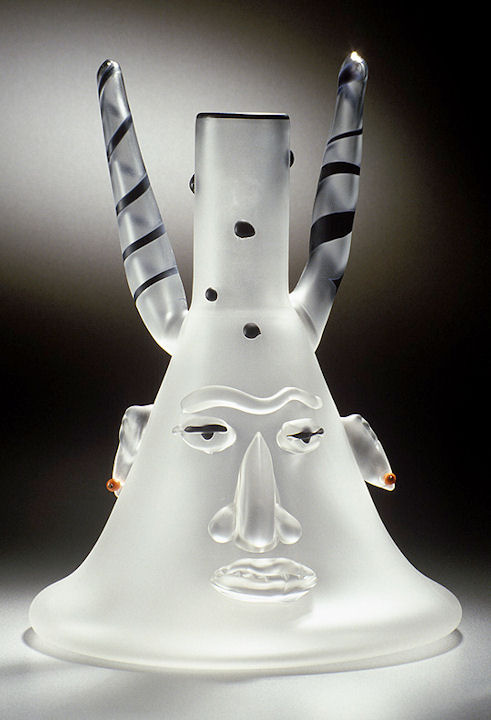
The Doctor, Louvre, Museum

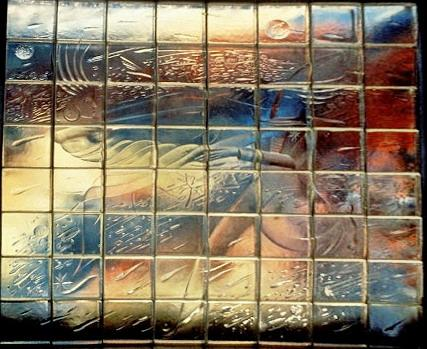
Fantasy, LA County Museum of Art

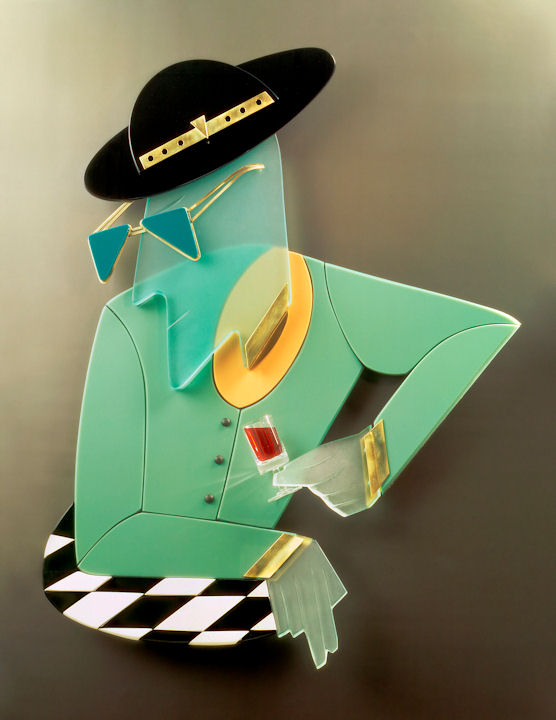
Cafe, 1979, Dan Dailey studio
