= Jackie Pancari =

American glass artist (1961–2021)

- Born: July 7, 1961; Philadelphia, Philadelphia
- Died: August 14, 2021 (aged 60); Andover, New York
- Website: jackiepancari.com

Jacqueline "Jackie" Pancari (1961–2021) was an American glass artist.

== Biography ==
Pancari was born on July 7, 1961 in Philadelphia, Philadelphia. She studied at the Tyler School of Art and Architecture and Alfred University. She was associated for many years with the Rochester Institute of Technology (RIT) as both an artist-in-residence and as a visiting artist. In 2013 Pancari was inducted into the RIT's Innovation Hall of Fame. In 2015 she was an artist-in-residence at the Corning Museum of Glass. There she worked on her Reflective and Refractive Index Series. Pancari was also a Creative Glass Fellow at WheatonArts.

Pancari died on August 14, 2021 in Andover, New York.

Her work is in the Burchfield Penney Art Center,
