= Martin Janecký =

Czech glass artist (born 1980)

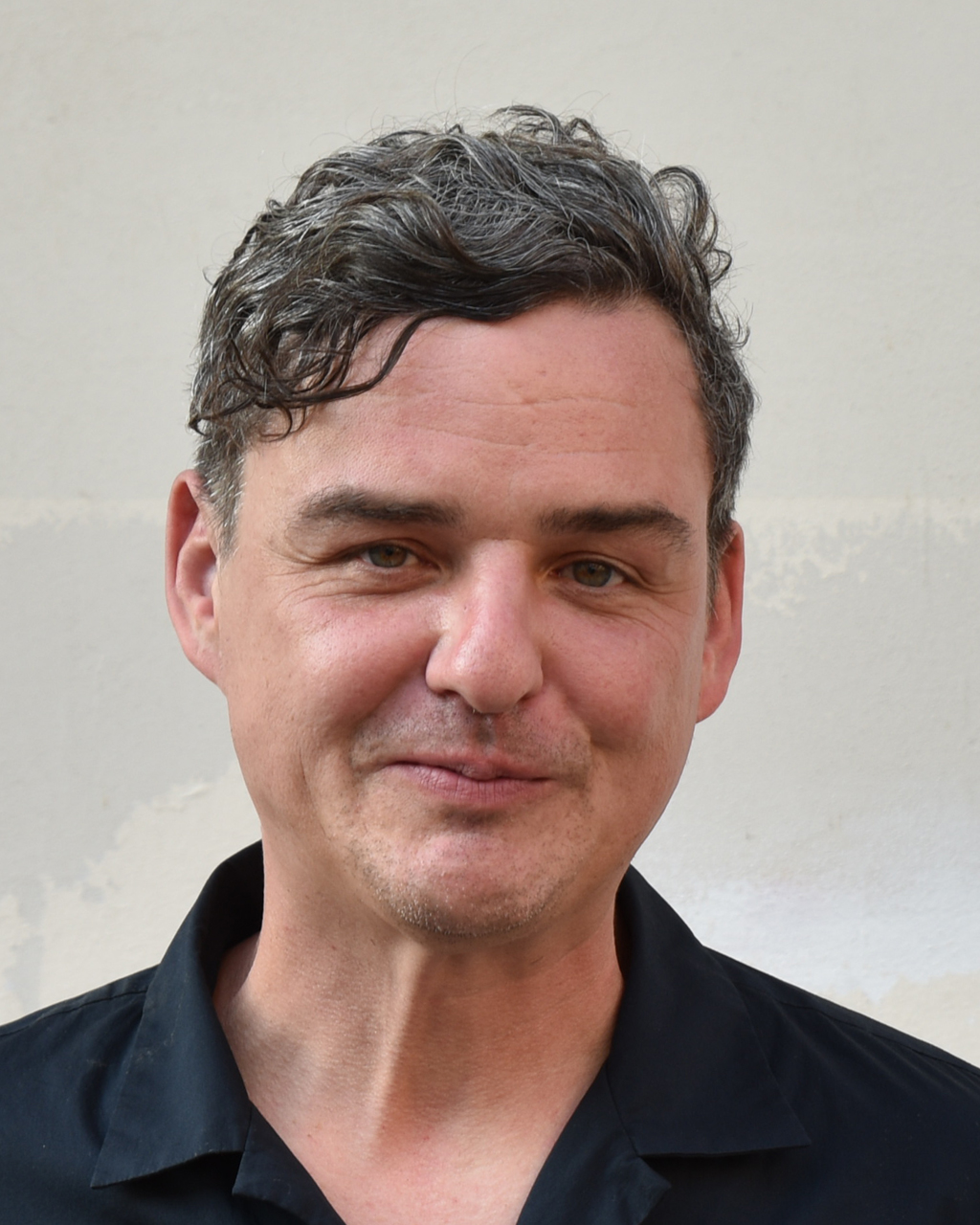
- Martin Janecký (2024)
- Born: 29 February 1980 (age 46)
- Occupation: Glass artist
- Known for: Sculpture, Glass, Contemporary art
- Website: janecky-studio.com

Martin Janecký (born 29 February 1980, in Liberec) is a Czech glass artist who has also worked extensively in the United States. He creates glass sculptures by shaping the hot glass bubbles from the inside. He has exhibited his work in galleries and museums in Europe as well as in the United States.

== About ==
Martin Janecký began working with glass at the age of thirteen at his father's factory in the Czech Republic. After graduating from the Glass School in Nový Bor he gained experiences in South Africa, Sweden, and the Netherlands. In 2003 Janecký made his first trip to the United States where he studied at the Pilchuck Glass School under Richard Royal and William Morris. Soon Janecký became an instructor at various glass programs all over the world, such as The Studio of the Corning Museum of Glass, Pilchuck Glass School, Penland School of Craft, the Australian National University in Canberra, University of Toyama.
In 2019 Janecký founded his own glass studio - Janecký Studio, in the centre of Prague.

== Artwork ==
Czech artist Martin Janecký focuses on the technique of hot glass sculpting from within the bubble, creating highly realistic heads at life-sized scale by hot-working the glass on the pipe in innovative ways. He learned the basics of this method from William Morris. Nevertheless, Janecký perfected this technique, mastered only by a few people around the world, and adapted it to his ideas. He added his own techniques to take three-dimensional glass into portraiture, with new levels of detail and precision. His heads, figures and skulls are inspired by art history and ethnic masks.

Following a 2013 visit to Mexico, Janecký concentrated on an exploration of the human skull. He was inspired by the rich iconography surrounding the rituals of the Mexican holiday Día de Los Muertos (the Day of the Dead). In 2017, Janecký worked at The Studio of the Corning Museum of Glass as an Artist-In-Residence where he created a body of work called “Día de Muertos”, attempting to translate his fascination with the Mexican celebration into glass. The collection of artwork was exhibited in the Heller Gallery in New York City in 2018.

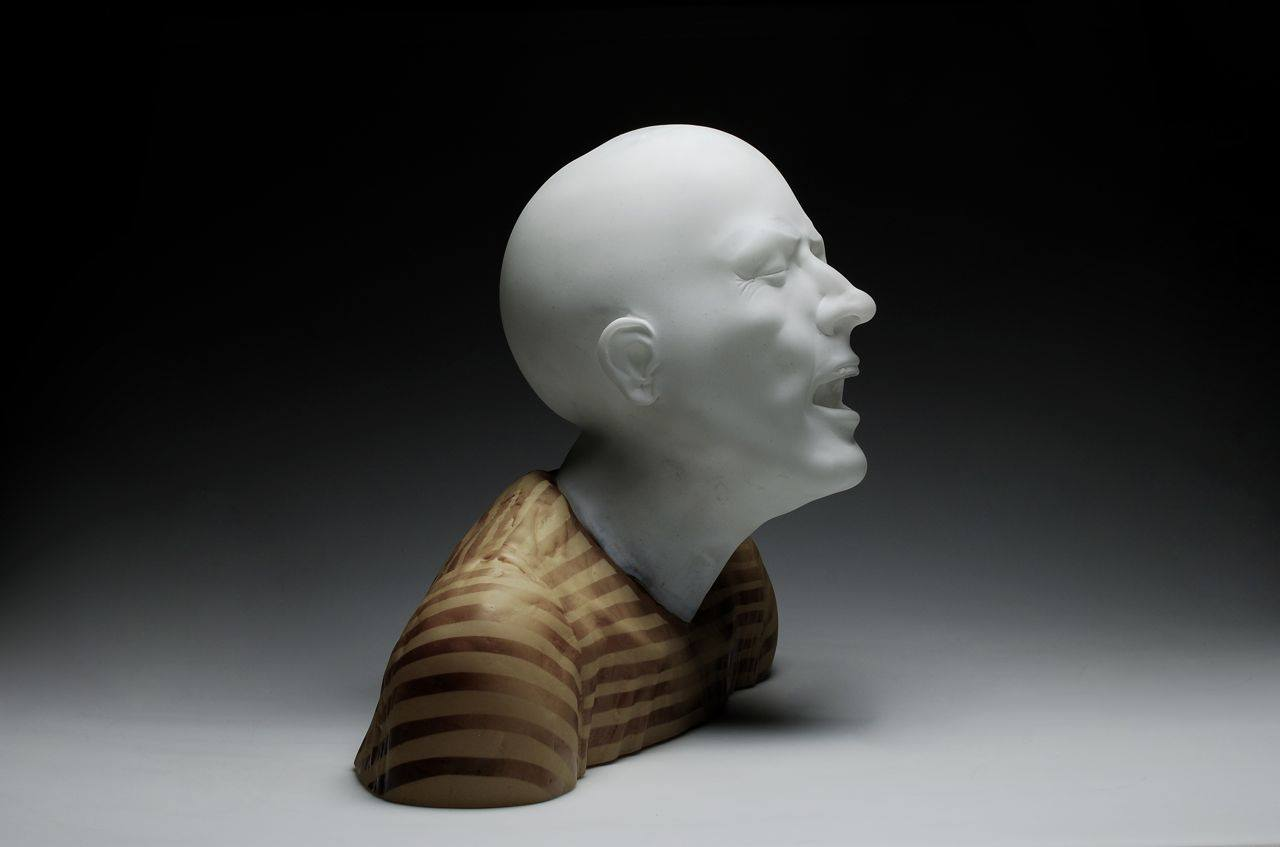
Head, 2014, hand sculpted glass

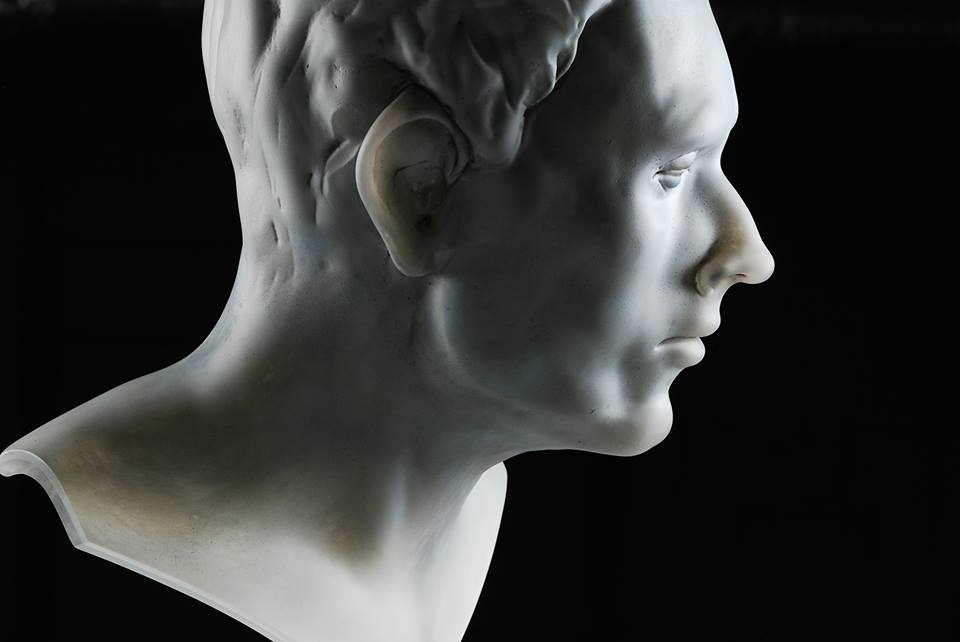
Portrait of a Man, 2015, hand sculpted glass

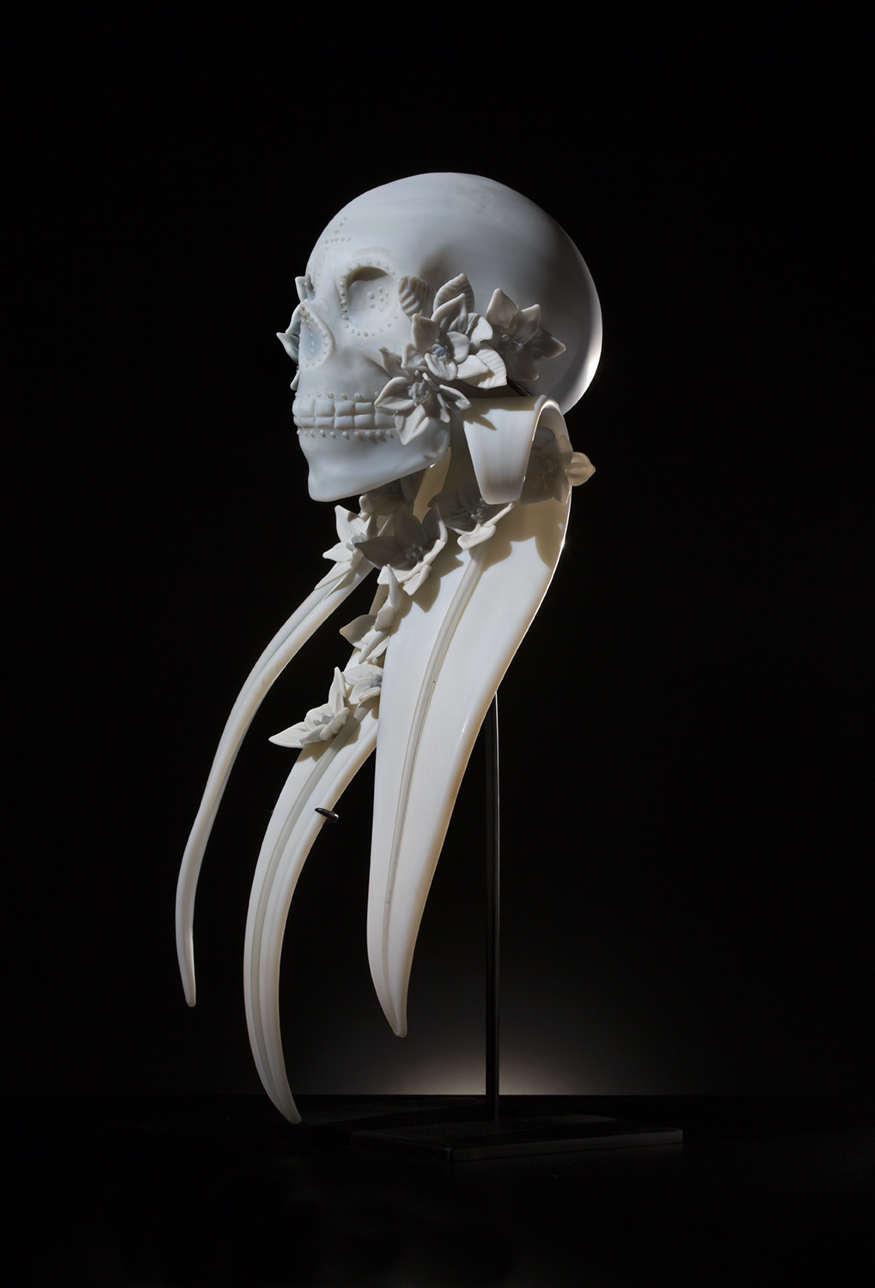
La Palida, Día de Muertos, 2017, hand sculpted glass, Photo: Russell Johnson

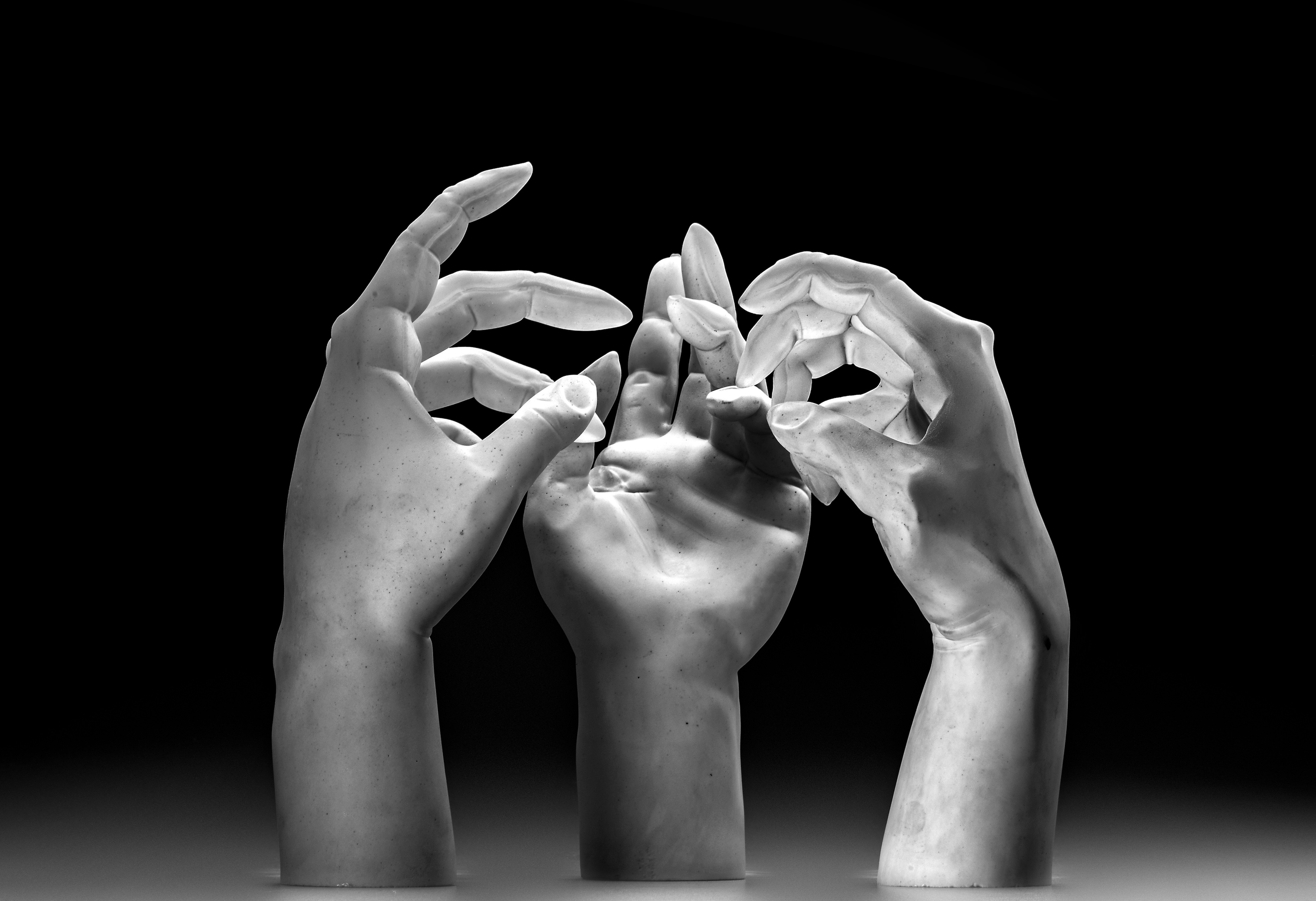
Studies of Hands, 2018, hand sculpted glass, Photo: Gabriel Urbánek

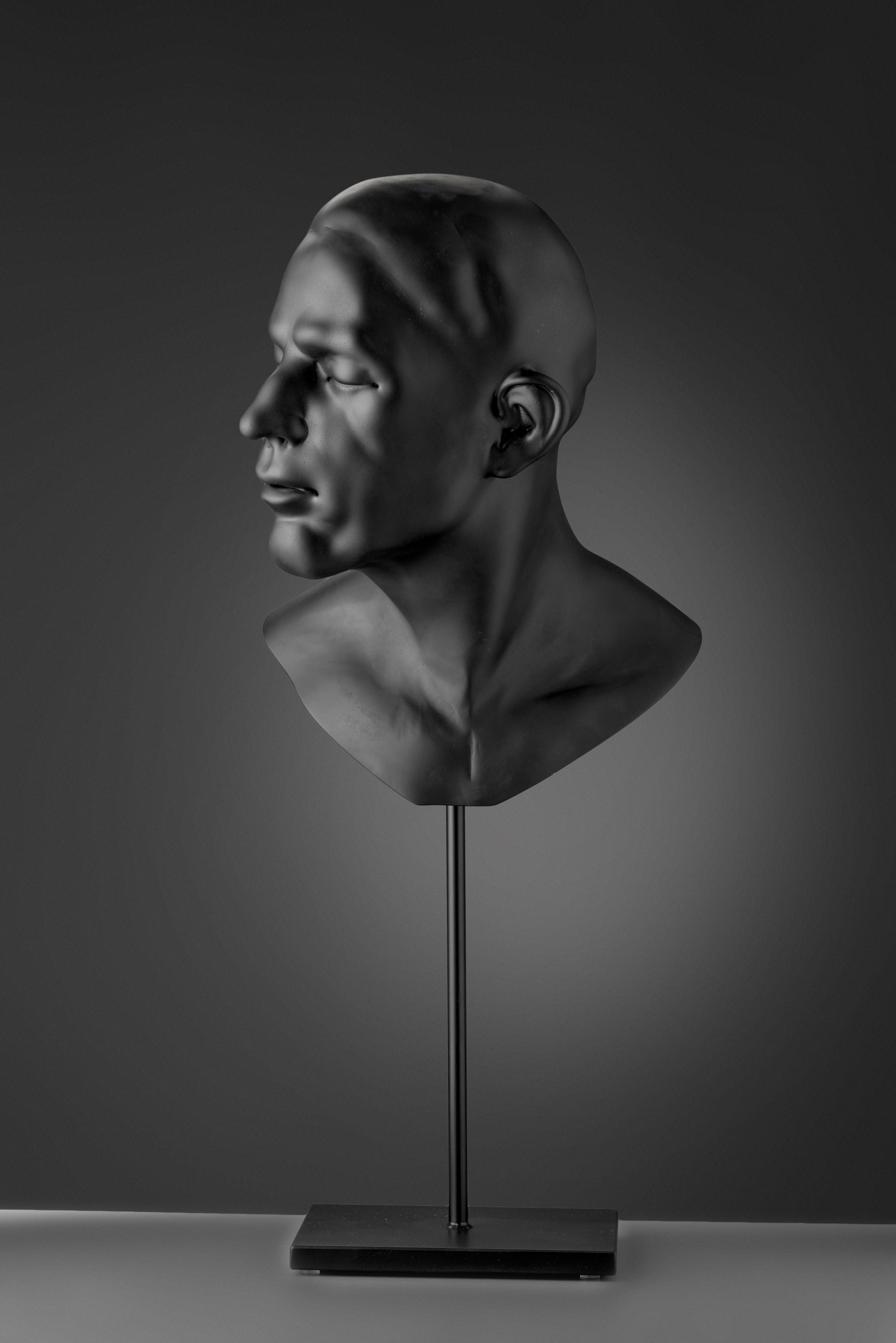
Portrait of a Man, 2018, hand sculpted glass, Photo: Gabriel Urbánek

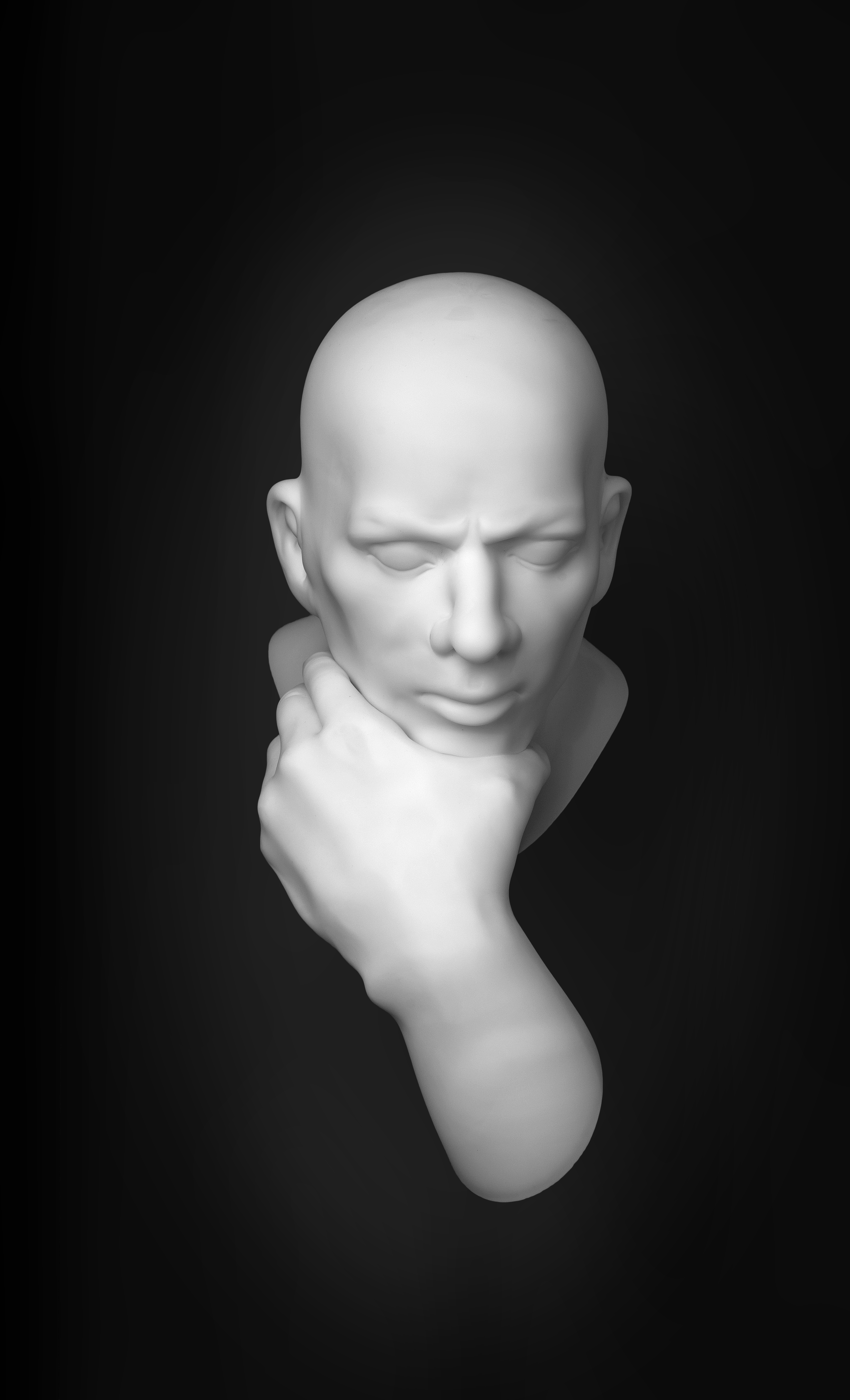
Thinker, 2019, hand sculpted glass, Photo: Gabriel Urbánek

== Awards ==
2010 Collectors Award Dennis and Barbara Dubois, 38th Annual International Glass Invitational Awards Exhibition, Habatat Galleries, USA
2008 Artist of the Month, Art Alliance for Contemporary Art, USA
2006 Kaiser Foundation Award, Pilchuck Glass School, USA
2005 Nominated for the SAXE award for the best TA, Pilchuck Glass School, USA
2001 Řemeslo a umění ve skle, Sklářské muzeum Nový Bor, CZ
