= Marina Hanser =

Austrian glass artist and educator

Marina Hanser (born 1986) is a glass artist and educator from Austria.

== Biography ==
Hanser moved to Australia in 2010 and completed a Bachelor of Visual Arts with a specialization in glass from the School of Art at the Australian National University in Canberra in 2014. She also studied at the Glasfachschule Kramsach in Austria and Vetroricerca Studios in Italy. In March and April 2017 she held an artist's residency at the Corning Museum of Glass.

Her glasswork involves both traditional and non-traditional kiln casting, as well as coldworking and pâte de verre techniques.

Hanser has won the Warm Glass Prize in the United Kingdom and the Boronia Award in Glass.
