= Linda MacNeil =

American metalsmith and jeweler (born 1954)

- Born: April 14, 1954 (age 72); Framingham, Massachusetts, U.S.
- Education: University of the Arts, Massachusetts College of Art and Design
- Alma mater: Rhode Island School of Design
- Spouse: Dan Dailey
- Children: 2
- Website: www.lindamacneil.com

Linda MacNeil (born April 14, 1954) is an American metalsmith, jeweler, abstract artist, and sculptor. She works with glass and metal specializing in contemporary jewelry that combines metalwork with glass to create wearable sculpture. Her focus since 1975 has been sculptural objets d’art and jewelry, and she works in series. MacNeil’s jewelry is considered wearable sculpture and has been her main focus since 1996.

MacNeil is married to American glass sculptor, Dan Dailey. “MacNeil’s artistic relationship with her husband is distinguished between their very different aesthetic approaches to glass as medium. Dailey is known for his often witty use of glass in narrative constructions. MacNeil is more abstract, allowing the material to be itself. It is a philosophical divide between the celebration of form and materiality and the championing of human intellectual vector as applied to the material”

MacNeil has been published in Modern Magazine, and has been exhibited in The Mint Museum, Sculptural Radiance exhibition. Her work has been referred to as enhancements both in the fields of glass and jewelry.

== Early life and education ==
Linda MacNeil was born on April 14, 1954, in Framingham, Massachusetts. and raised in Farmingham MacNeil studied at the Philadelphia College of Art (now known as the University of the Arts), and the Massachusetts College of Art and Design. She received her BFA degree in 1976 from the Rhode Island School of Design (RISD). At RISD, MacNeil studied in the jewelry and light metals department headed by Professor John “Jack” Prip. He was a major influence on her work, “Jack taught me a beautiful way of softening the hardness of a geometric idea and to keep with it a conceptual idea that is different and my own.” The Rhode Island School of Design Museum has in its permanent collection the work, Neck Collar No.4 (1988). MacNeil interned with Japanese American Jeweler, Miye Matsukata at the Haystack Mountain School of Crafts.

MacNeil was introduced to glass as a medium at the Massachusetts College of Art and Design by her future husband, the glass and metal sculptor Dan Dailey.

== Career ==
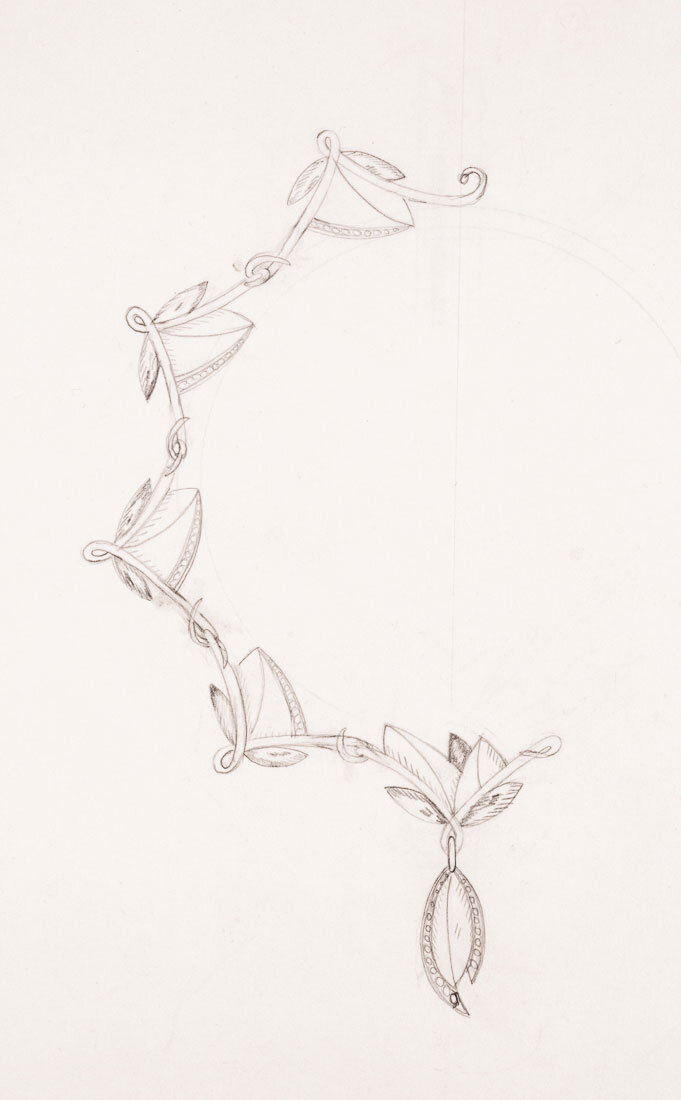
Linda MacNeil, Drawing of Primavera necklace, 2008

MacNeil sets great store by the "wearability" of her pieces as well as on perfect execution. MacNeil individually casts and hand carves or otherwise manipulates each of the glass elements in her neck pieces, ear rings and brooches. Art Jewelry Today published in 2003, identifies MacNeil as a pioneer in the use of glass in contemporary jewelry, while making reference to historic precedents. An interview with MacNeil in 2013 on Art Jewelry Forum references her interest in Art Deco, specifically the work of René Lalique.

One of the glass making techniques MacNeil employs is lost wax casting with pâte de verre (see Nile Grass below) to create intricate shapes with great surface detail. Her work was chosen as an example of this technique, which was very popular in the nineteenth century Art Deco movement, by Jeffrey B. Snyder in Art Jewelry Today 2

MacNeil has been featured in many international group exhibitions including the Museum of Arts and Design GlassWear exhibition in 2009, "an international contemporary art exhibition celebrating the marriage of two of the richest and most inventive areas in today’s decorative arts—glass and jewelry. Organized jointly by the Museum of Arts and Design and the Schmuckmuseum, Pforzheim, Germany. [...] The exhibition displays highly innovative glass creations by the world’s leading jewelry artists, including Linda MacNeil and..."

MacNeil’s earliest works were mostly objects in silver - vases and vessels and small sculptures. The Bell with Stand, 1974, sculpture created while at RISD was acquired in 2021 and is now in the permanent collection at The Metal Museum in Memphis, TN. Many of MacNeil’s jewelry pieces are in museum collections around the world including the Metropolitan Museum, New York, Smithsonian American Art Museum, Washington, National Gallery of Australia, and the V&A in London.

MacNeil became a member of the American Jewelry Design Council (AJDC) in 2011. She created and led their exhibition committee and then later accepted the role of president of the organization for a term from 2019-2021.

In 2020 her “Primavera” necklace won the Saul Bell Design Award in the category of metals and alternative materials.

MacNeil and her husband Dan Dailey live and work in New Hampshire. They have two children.

== Work ==
=== Work influences and characteristics ===
Geometric forms are dominant in MacNeil’s work. “My brain thinks in a very geometric way.”— MacNeil interview for AJDC. In 2002 a book was published, United in Beauty: The Jewelry and Collectors of Linda MacNeil with portraits of eighty women wearing pieces created by MacNeil. In the introductory essay, Helen W. Drutt English notes: 'Like Olaf Skoogfors and Toni Goessler-Snyder before her, she can claim to be a constructivist whose passion for geometric forms allows her to create works that are compositions in themselves'

Both MacNeil and her husband Dan are influenced by the Decorative Arts and in particular Art Deco building surface details. Other pieces use polished Vitriolite (see Elements below), a dense, opaque, industrial glass made prior to the 1940s, often in pieces that are a reinterpretation of Art Deco; some, such as the Lucent Lines series (see below), use acid-polished glass with gold connecting rods drilled through using the visual distortions of glass to create shifting geometric patterns.

Some rigid collars from the late 1980s and early 1990s were inspired in part by Bronze Age Celtic neckpieces and Egyptian jewelry while others again reference the Art Deco period.

Color and its interplay with light is the other major factor in her work and this is why glass takes center stage because MacNeil can manipulate and control its translucence, transparency, reflectivity, color and texture, completely. (reference total control quote) Each glass jewel she creates is totally unique. Kate Dobbs Ariail writing in Metalsmith about the Mint Museum of Craft & Design's exhibit; "Sculptural Radiance: The Jewelry and Objects of Linda MacNeil" notes that "MacNeil evidences an unusually nuanced appreciation of her material. Her use of a variety of types of glass, along with various finishing techniques, gives her an unexpectedly broad palette of hue, value, tint and reflectivity, so that her crisp design takes on a painterly tone."

The physical scale of MacNeil works is determined by its relationship with the body. An article exploring MacNeil’s work highlights scale, “Monumentality in art, as Andre Malraux famously implied through his concept of the Musée Imaginaire, […] is not necessarily dependent on the actual size of an object.”

=== Materials and techniques ===
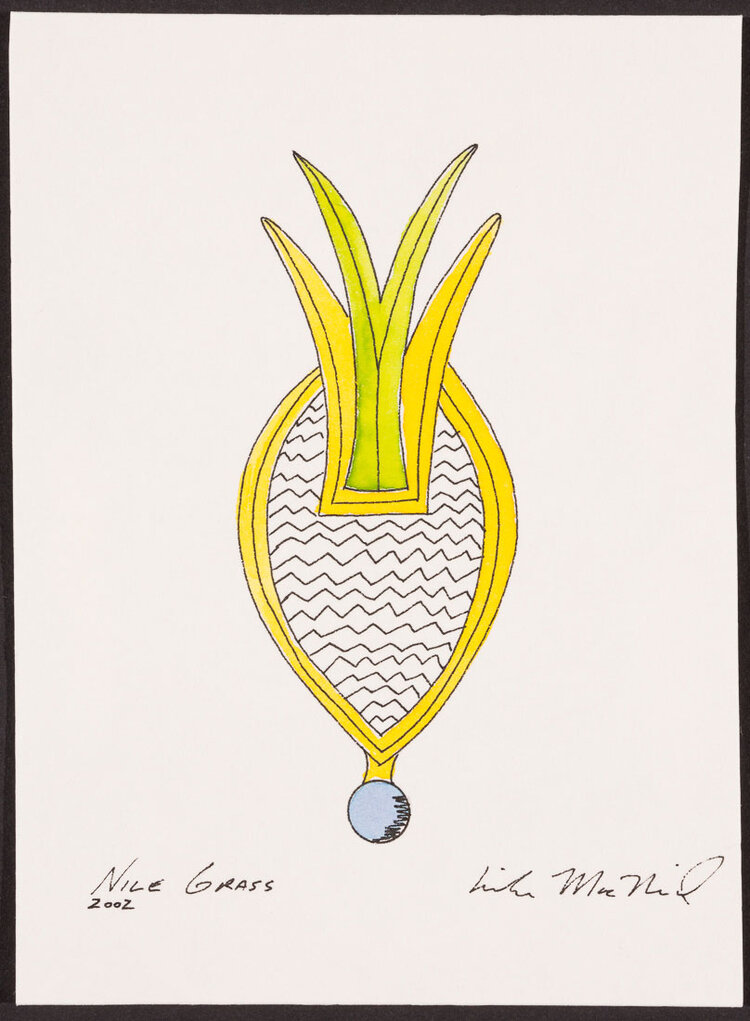
Linda MacNeil Drawing of "Nile Grass" brooch. Brooch Series No.18, 2002

==== Vitrolite ====
Vintage and Modern Plate Glass Art Jewelry Today published in 2003, identifies MacNeil as a pioneer in the use of glass in contemporary jewelry, while making reference to historic precedents. While at college, MacNeil and Dailey spent summers traveling across the United States collecting Vitrolite. Vitrolite is structural pigmented plate glass. It was produced between 1908 and 1947 first by The Vitrolite Company then by Libbey Owens Ford Glass of Toledo. It was made in distinctive opaque colors and is a rare, finite material. MacNeil combines this vintage glass with contemporary glass to create unique jewels. (eg Mesh No.132, 2012, Brooch No.81, 2013, Plate Glass Vessel, No.5, 1983, Hand Mirror, No15, 1981)

==== Metal ====
MacNeil’s earliest works were made in pewter or silver - vases and vessels and small sculptures eg Pewter Vessel 1975. The Bell with Stand, 1974 was brass and is in permanent collection of The Metal Museum, Memphis. Early jewelry was also silver, but she then moved to plating brass with gold, or rhodium using stock and metal rods, and silver soldering.

==== Diamonds ====
"Linda MacNeil makes glass a central element in her elegant and meticulously conceived jewelry, setting [glass] components in gold, silver, and industrial metals as if these non-precious bits of glass were gemstones. In her Necklace, (from the Elements Series, 2006), MacNeil uses clear, polished glass “gemstones” to draw the viewer’s attention, while traditional diamonds serve a visually supporting role." - The MAD Museum

=== Techniques ===
MacNeil introduces pattern into her work through three processes, Diamond Cut, Kiln Cast and a Stencil Sandblasting process and takes her inspiration from building surfaces, facades, tiles and textiles, Art Deco, Lalique and Egyptian Art A glass making technique MacNeil employs is lost wax casting with Fritt to create intricate shapes with great surface detail. Her work was chosen as an example of this technique, which was very popular in the nineteenth century Art Deco movement, by Jeffrey B. Snyder in Art Jewelry Today To create some of her more organic pieces MacNeil has used fritting as a technique that creates bubbles within the glass. The size of the bubbles can be controlled as can the quantity.

== Gallery ==
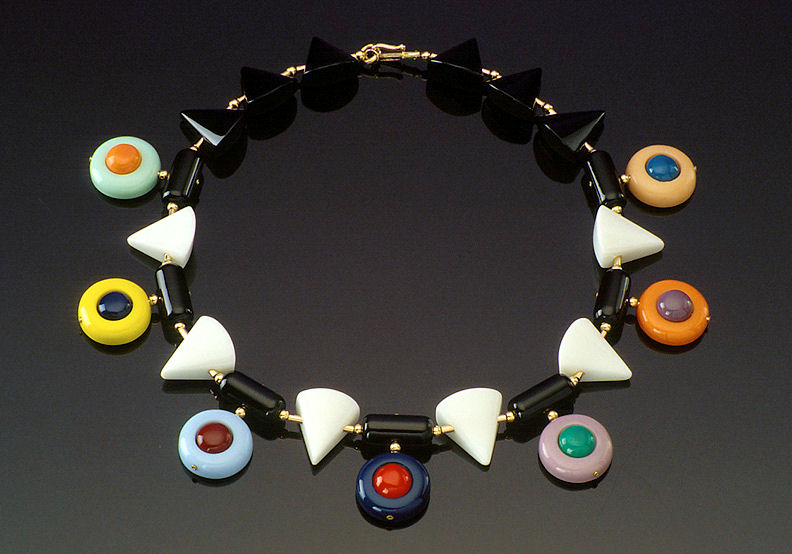
Elements 1984; Includes Vitrolite

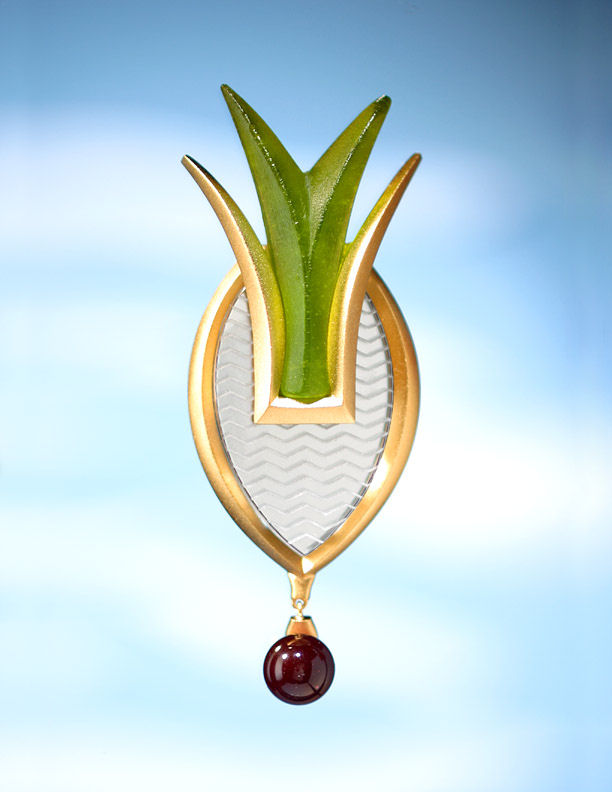
Nile Grass 2002; Includes pâte de verre

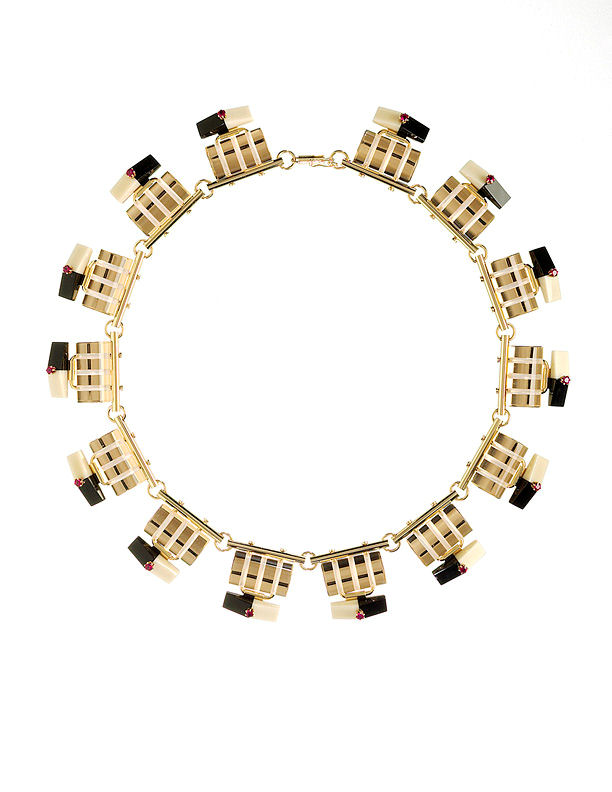
Lucent Lines 2004

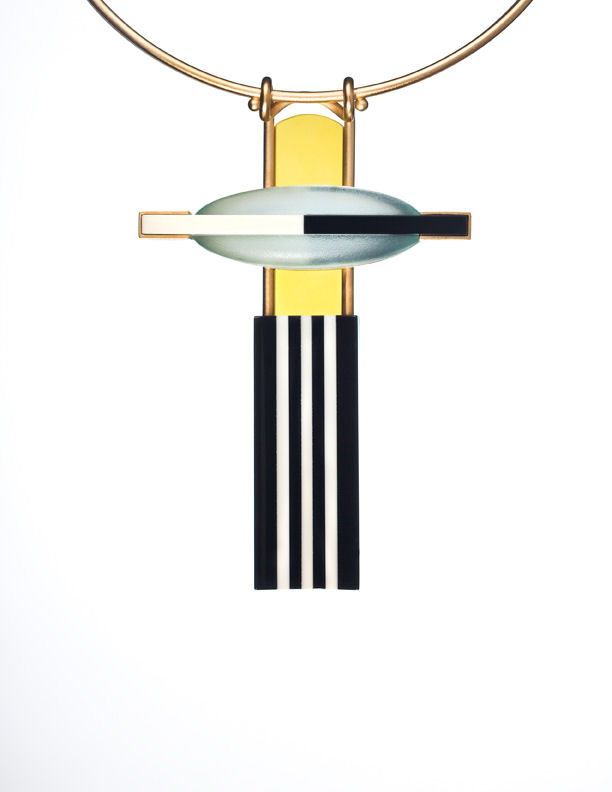
Neck Collar 2010

== Public museum collections ==
- American Jewelry Design Council, Hermitage, Pennsylvania
- Cleveland Museum of Art, Cleveland, Ohio
- Corning Museum of Glass, Corning, New York
- Currier Museum of Art, Manchester, New Hampshire
- Detroit Institute of Art, Detroit, Michigan
- Fuller Craft Museum, Brockton, Massachusetts
- Gemological Institute of America, Carlsbad, California
- Henry Ford Museum of American Innovation, Dearborn, Michigan
- Los Angeles County Museum of Art
- Les Archives de la Cristallerie Daum, Nancy and Paris, France
- Metropolitan Museum of Art, New York City, New York
- Metal Museum, Memphis, TN
- Mint Museum, Charlotte, North Carolina
- Museum of Arts and Design (formerly known as the American Craft Museum), New York City, New York
- Montreal Museum of Fine Arts, Montreal, Quebec, Canada
- Museum of Fine Arts, Houston, Houston, Texas
- Museum of Fine Arts, Boston, Boston, Massachusetts
- National Liberty Museum, Philadelphia, Pennsylvania
- National Gallery of Australia, Canberra, Australia
- Philadelphia Museum of Art, Philadelphia, Pennsylvania
- Racine Art Museum, Racine, Wisconsin
- Renwick Gallery, Smithsonian American Art Museum, Washington, D.C.
- Rhode Island School of Design Museum, Providence, Rhode Island
- Smithsonian American Art Museum, Washington, D.C.
- J. B. Speed Art Museum, Louisville, Kentucky
- Toledo Museum of Art, Toledo, Ohio
- Victoria and Albert Museum, London, England

== Exhibitions ==
This is a select list of exhibitions by MacNeil

=== Solo exhibitions ===
- 2017 Museum of Glass, Tacoma, Washington, Linda MacNeil “Jewels of Glass” ( exh.catalog)
- 2013 Mobilia Gallery, Cambridge, Massachusetts, Brooches (exh. brochure) Sandra Ainsley Gallery, Toronto (parallel solo show for Dan Dailey)
- 2012 Dane Gallery, Nantucket, Massachusetts, Floral Jewelry: Glass and Precious Metal Jewelry
- 2011 Habatat Galleries, West Palm Beach, Florida, New Body of Work by Dan Dailey and Linda MacNeil
- 2010 Mobilia Gallery, Cambridge, Massachusetts, Recent Jewelry (exh. brochure) Schantz Galleries Contemporary Glass, Stockbridge, Massachusetts, Elements of Style: The Sculptural Jewelry of Linda MacNeil (exh. brochure)
- 2009 Habatat Galleries, Tysons Corner, Virginia (parallel solo show for Dan Dailey) SOFA West: Santa Fe 2009: Sculpture Objects & Functional Art Fair (with Dan Dailey at Scott Jacobson Gallery) (exh. cat.)
- 2007 Hawk Galleries, Columbus, Ohio (parallel solo show for Dan Dailey)
- 2005 Habatat Galleries, Boca Raton, Florida, Linda MacNeil: Glass & Gold (parallel solo show for Dan Dailey)
- 2003 Mint Museum of Craft + Design, Charlotte, North Carolina, Sculptural Radiance: The Jewelry & Objects of Linda MacNeil
- 2001 Habatat Galleries, Boca Raton, Florida (parallel solo show for Dan Dailey) Riley Hawk Galleries, Columbus and Cleveland, Ohio, and Kirkland, Washington, Joint Exhibition: Dan Dailey, The Expressive Figure/ Solid Gold & Precious Jewelry of Linda MacNeil South Shore Art Center, Cohasset, Massachusetts, Art in Glass & Metal: Dan Dailey and Linda MacNeil (exh. brochure)
- 2000 Paul Mellon Arts Center Gallery, Choate Rosemary Hall, Wallingford, Connecticut, Jewelry (parallel solo show for Dan Dailey)
- 1999 Riley Hawk Galleries, Kirkland, Washington The Art Center in Hargate, St. Paul’s School, Concord, New Hampshire, Dan Dailey and Linda MacNeil: Art in Glass and Metal (exh. cat. and video)
- 1998 Riley Hawk Galleries, Cleveland and Columbus, Ohio (parallel solo show for Dan Dailey)
- 1997 Habatat Galleries, Boca Raton, Florida, New Work (parallel solo show for Dan Dailey)
- 1996 Riley Hawk Galleries, Cleveland and Columbus, Ohio, New Work (parallel solo show for Dan Dailey)
- 1995–96 Imago Galleries, Palm Desert, California (parallel solo show for Dan Dailey)
- 1995 Habatat Galleries, Boca Raton, Florida (parallel solo show for Dan Dailey) Vespermann Gallery, Atlanta, Special Collection of Linda MacNeil Glass Necklaces (parallel solo show for Dan Dailey)
- 1993 Riley Hawk Galleries, Cleveland and Columbus, Ohio (parallel solo show for Dan Dailey)
- 1991 Riley Hawk Galleries, Cleveland and Columbus, Ohio (parallel solo show for Dan Dailey)
- 1988 Helen Drutt Gallery, Philadelphia
- 1987 Helen Drutt Gallery, Philadelphia, Contemporary Jewelry
- 1986 Anne O’Brien Gallery, Washington, DC, Constructed Vessels and Jewelry
- 1985 Heller Gallery, New York, Glass Sculpture (parallel solo show for Dan Dailey)
- 1984 Habatat Galleries, Bay Harbor Islands, Florida (parallel solo show for Dan Dailey)
- 1983 David Bernstein Gallery, Boston Kurland/Summers Gallery, Los Angeles
- 1981 Habatat Galleries, Lathrup Village, Michigan, Pyramidal Vessels (parallel solo show for Dan Dailey) (exh. brochure)
- 1980 Julie: Artisans’ Gallery, New York, Glass and Metal Hand Mirrors
- 1979 Ten Arrow Gallery, Cambridge, Massachusetts, Glass Jewelry Combined with Precious Metals
