= Lyubov Savelyeva =

Russian glass artist

Lyubov Savelyeva (also spelt Savelieva; born 1940) is a Russian glass artist. Her work is part of the collection of the Corning Museum of Glass, the Museum of Contemporary Glass in Ukraine, Museum of Contemporary Glass in Ebeltoft. Denmark

== Biography ==
Savelyeva was born in Moscow, Russia and graduated from Moscow Higher School of Industrial Art (Stroganovskoe) in 1966. In 1969 she began teaching ceramics and glass at university level. In 1988 she became a member of the International Association of Art Glass and in 1990 she received an "artist of the year" award in the USA. She was one of only three glass artists elected to the Soviet Academy of Fine Arts.
