= Hermonia Vivarini =

Italian artist

Hermonia Vivarini (16th-century), was a Venetian glass artist.

She was born to the glass artist Alvise Vivarini of Murano.

On 22 May 1521, she was granted a ten-year-long patent and privilege to manufacture a glass pitcher shaped as a ship of her own design (navicella). It was uncommon for women to be granted a privilege from the famous glass guild of Murano. She was a successful artist, and her ship-shaped pitcher design became popular and was copied by many contemporary artists.
