= Claire Deleurme =

French glass artist

Claire Deleurme is a French glass artist. Her work is held in the permanent collection of the Corning Museum of Glass in New York, United States.

== Biography ==
Deleurme completed a National College Diploma in Visual Arts from École nationale des beaux-arts de Cornouaille, France, and a European Glass Fellows Diploma with honors from Centre Européen de Recherches et Formation aux Arts Verriers, Vannes-le-Châtel, France. In 2016, she held a residency at the Corning Museum of Glass in the United States.
