= Dobbelaer =

Belgian stained glass artist active in Bruges

H. Dobbelaer was a stained glass designer and maker at Bruges, Belgium around 1880. An example of his work depicting Joseph being reunited with his brothers can be seen at St Mary's church Cottingham, chancel south side second window.
