= Kari Russell-Pool =

American artist (born 1967)

Kari Russell-Pool (born 1967) is an American artist known for work in contemporary glass art. She was born in Salem, Massachusetts. She studied at the Cleveland Institute of Art.

Her work is included in the collections of the Seattle Art Museum, the Mint Museum in Charlotte, North Carolina and the Smithsonian American Art Museum.
