= Granite Calimpong =

American glass artist

- Education: University of California, San Diego; University of Washington School of Art + Art History + Design
- Known for: Glass art
- Website: www.granitecalimpong.com

Granite Calimpong (born 1982/83) is a Pacific Northwest glass artist. He received an undergraduate degree in Interdisciplinary Computing in the Arts at University of California San Diego in 2007. In 2013 he was artist-in-residence at Pittsburgh Glass Center for six weeks. Calimpong was a Master of Fine Arts candidate at University of Washington School of Art + Art History + Design as of 2018.

In July–August 2018, Calimpong was scheduled to be an instructor at Haystack Mountain School of Crafts. He has also taught workshops at the Pilchuck Glass School and the Penland School of Crafts.

His glass art is both blown and cold worked, and described as "form based".
