= Silvia Levenson =

Argentine artist (born 1957)

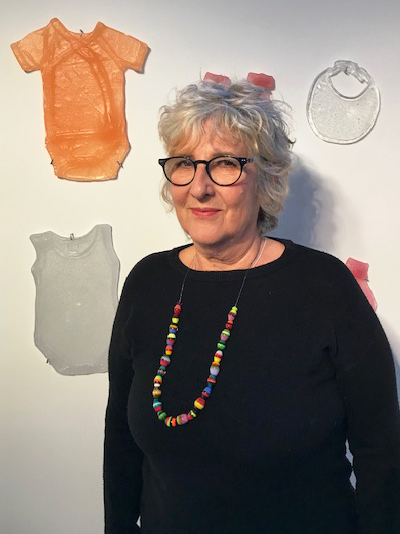
Silvia Levenson, 2023. On the wall parts of her artwork Identity are visible.

Silvia Levenson (born 1957, in Buenos Aires, Argentina) is an Argentine contemporary artist and political activist working in glass. Originally a graphic artist in her native Argentina whose political work was in direct conflict with the dictatorship of Jorge Rafael Videla, she found herself and her young family immigrating to Italy in 1980. Glass soon became the new medium in which she could best express her feelings of exile, oppression and personal tragedy.

== Biography ==
Silvia Levenson was born in Buenos Aires, Argentina in 1957. Her mother was a dressmaker, her father was a social worker. Born into a time when political and social activism was encouraged, she began protesting on behalf of the Buenos Aires poor as early as 14. By the time she was 16 she was married and at the age of 19 she had her first child. She studied at Martin Garcia School of Graphic Design and after graduation worked in this field. It was during this time that the political climate in Argentina began to change with the military taking control of the government under Jorge Rafael Videla, the senior commander of the Argentine Army. Between 1976 and 1984 more than 30,000 people disappeared and were later killed, including members of Levenson's own family. She and her family lived three years in hiding.

In 1981 Levenson was warned that she was discovered. The family fled Argentina for Italy, where Levenson's husband had family. It was the tragic events of this time that ultimately influenced and continue to influence Levenson's artistic practice.

In Italy, Levenson first worked in graphic design, but soon turned to painting. After seeing an exhibition of Swedish artist Bertil Vallien in New York City in 1985, she became interested in glass as an artistic medium. Subsequently she participated in workshops on glass processing, e.g. "pâte de verre", a technique to work with multicolored glass, in Sars-Poteries, France. Back in Italy, she opened a studio near Milan in 1990.

Since 1995 Levenson's glass artworks are shown in exhibitions worldwide.

== Collections ==
Silvia Levenson's works are held in the collections of Alexander-Tutsek-Stiftung, Munich, Bullseye Glass Company, Portland, Fine Art Museum, Houston, Museo del Vetro, Altare, Museo Provincial de Bellas Artes, La Plata, and other international collections.
