= Nancy Mee =

American sculptor and glass artist

Nancy Mee (born 1951) is an American sculptor and glass artist.

Her work is included in the collections of the Seattle Art Museum, the Tacoma Art Museum and the Portland Art Museum.
