= Nola Anderson =

Australian academic

- Occupations: Museum professional, academic and arts writer

Nola Anderson is an Australian museum professional, academic, and arts writer. She worked at the Australian War Memorial (AWM) for 25 years, and was one of its assistant directors from 2003 until 2011. She served as the acting Director of the memorial from November 2011 until December 2012, and has since been an independent arts and museum consultant. Anderson has written books on the AWM's collection and the career of glass artist Klaus Moje.

== Biography ==
Anderson completed a degree in Fine Arts at the University of Sydney. She taught glassworks at the Australian National University's School of Art during the 1980s. As of 1982, she was also one of The Canberra Times' art writers.

In 1987 Anderson took up a position at the Australian War Memorial in Canberra. She remained at the Memorial for 25 years and worked in roles focused on managing its collection and preparing exhibitions. This included curating several exhibitions and serving as head of Photographs Film and Sound. In 1998 Anderson won a Smithsonian Research Fellowship in Museum Studies that involved a twelve-month residential placement. As of August 2003 she held the position of Senior Curator - Photo, Film and Sound. In September that year Anderson was appointed one of the memorial's Assistant Directors and the Branch Head National Collection. She was also active in the Canberra arts community during this period, and in 1995 selected the works that were displayed in the ACT Craft Council's annual exhibition.

Anderson became the acting Director of the AWM in November 2011 when the incumbent Director Steve Gower took a lengthy period of carer's leave. She continued in this role until 14 December 2012 when she left the memorial. The Canberra Times reported that AWM staff had expected that Anderson would be selected as the new director, but former Defence minister Brendan Nelson was the successful applicant. He began in this role on 17 December 2012.

While working as the acting Director, Anderson completed the book Australian War Memorial: Treasures from a Century of Collecting which was published in October 2012. The book provides a history of the AWM's national collection and describes some of the key items the memorial holds. As part of a positive review, The Sydney Morning Herald noted that "the tome could only have been produced by somebody with the intimate knowledge of the memorial, its history and the collection Anderson has acquired over the past two decades".

Since leaving the AWM Anderson has been an independent consultant in the arts and museum sector. In June 2013 she was appointed chair of the Canberra Glassworks. She remained in this role until August 2017.

In January 2022 Anderson's book Glass: The Life and Art of Klaus Moje was published. She had worked alongside Klaus Moje at the Australian National University during the 1980s and began the book with him prior to his death in 2016. Moje gave Anderson access to his personal archive. Anderson won grants from the German government and the ACT Arts Fund to assist with producing the book.
