= Carol Lee Mei Kuen =

Carol Lee, or Lee Mei-kuen (born 1963) is a Hong Kong–based contemporary artist. Her work speculates on the concepts of time, memories and human relationships, utilizing shape, juxtaposition, color, rhythm and intensity. She is one of the founding members of MIA (Mere Independent Artists). She uses a time-based painting technique.

Lee received an MFA degree from RMIT University.

== Work ==
Lee's work has been described as "visually minimal and static."

== Works on paper ==
Lee's artwork usually consists of her tracing shadows of objects with a pencil on newsprint paper, cutting out a stencil and then exposing the paper (under the stencil) to sunlight. This causes the color of the paper to change and deepen in areas exposed to light.

The difference between photography and her works are that her methods do not include chemical substances that preserve color, therefore according to Lee, her work illustrates a philosophy of time painting.

== Glass art ==
Lee also produces sculptures in plate glass. She had produced a chair fabricated in panels of transparent glass, as well as a robot, and other objects. These works have been exhibited at the Hong Kong Arts Center, the Alexander Tutsek-Stiftung Foundation, Munich, Germany, the Lviv Glass Museum, Ukraine, among other venues.

== Exhibitions ==
Exhibitions include:

- ‘Chinese Abstract painting competition’ in Macau Art Museum, 2008
- Glass China, Alexander Tutsek-stiftung, Germany, 2008
- Art Container Project West Kowloon Cultural District, 2008
- Beyond Luminosity, Fotan Loft, 2008
- Till the end of the World, 1a space, cattle depot, 2007
- Under-layers Sino group, 2006
- To set fire and stir wind, 10 Chancerylane Gallery, 2004

== Collections ==
Her work is held in the permanent collection of the M+ Museum of modern and contemporary art in Kowloon.
