= Susan Stinsmuehlen-Amend =

American artist (born 1948)

- Born: Susan Stinsmuehlen; 1948 (age 77–78); Baltimore, Maryland, U.S.
- Education: Hood College, Indiana University Bloomington, University of Texas at Austin
- Known for: Studio glass, mixed media

Susan Stinsmuehlen–Amend (born 1948) is an American glass and mixed media artist. She lives in Ojai, California.

== Early life and education ==
Susan Stinsmuehlen-Amend was born in 1948, in Baltimore, Maryland.

She was educated at Hood College in Frederick, Maryland, Indiana University Bloomington, and the University of Texas at Austin. Stinsmuehlen-Amend studied with glass artists Narcissus Quagliata and Paul Marioni.

== Career ==
In 1973 while attending college, she bought into the Renaissance Glass company in Austin, Texas, an architectural glass business. In 1980, Marioni invited her to be his assistant at Pilchuck Glass School in Snohomish County, Washington.

Stinsmuehlen-Amend has been a guest artist and lecturer at many schools, including Penland School of Crafts, Rhode Island School of Design, Rochester Institute of Technology, Tyler School of Art and Architecture, North Lands Creative Glass (Scotland), and the Pilchuck Glass School (1980–1997).

She served as the first female president of the board of directors of the Glass Art Society, from 1984 to 1986.

Stinsmuehlen-Amend concentrated initially on experimental pieces that defied idealized standards of beauty, taste, form and pattern. She turned to working in glass because she felt it was more "exciting" to work with. She started creating her fragmented X series around 1978, in which she melded together a pastiche of colors and textures in a post-modern way. These pieces, fabricated with stained glass techniques, were meant to hang on walls, rather than as windows. As one of the few women working in studio glass at the time, her work also had feminist implications. The X was a symbol of how the artist wished to slash through the old, more staid ways of approaching glass.

She crossed between the various methods for manipulating glass and incorporated other media into her assemblage-like pieces, using scraps of everyday material to give them texture, depth, and meaning.

In the late 1990s, the structure of her work moved towards rectilinear, with diptychs and triptychs of contrasted figures and patterns. She broke her compositions down into split segments that were meant to be absorbed together despite being separated into individual panels. She integrated imagery and symbols to suggest narrative.

In later work Stinsmuehlen-Amend sandwiched individual glass planes of images on top of one another, giving them multi-dimensionality. In these layered wall panels the viewer is meant to see into the depth of the piece but not through it, as would be the case if these panes were acting as traditional windows or screens.

In 2026, she was named a fellow of the American Craft Council (ACC).

== Collections ==
- Los Angeles County Museum of Art, Los Angeles, California
- Tacoma Art Museum, Tacoma, Washington
- Corning Museum of Glass, Corning, New York
- Oakland Museum of California, Oakland, California
- Renwick Gallery of the National Museum of American Art, Smithsonian Institution, Washington, D.C.
- Jewish Museum, New York, New York
- Leigh Yawkey Woodson Museum, Wausau, Wisconsin
- Carnegie Art Museum, Oxnard, California
- Wagga Wagga City Art Gallery, New South Wales, Australia
- Nishida Museum, Toyoma, Japan
- Pilchuck Glass Center, Stanwood, Washington
- AT&T Foundation Headquarters, New York, New York
- AT&T Collection, Dallas, Texas
- American Airlines Terminal, Dallas/Fort Worth Airport, Texas
- Veterans Administration Medical Center, Dallas, Texas
- City of Los Angeles, Canoga Park, California
- City of Los Angeles, Hollywood, California
- Christ Church Cathedral, Ashmun/Schweppe, Houston, Texas
- Davis, Wright & Jones, Seattle, Washington
- Ojai Valley Community Hospital, Ojai, California
- Marshall Fields Corporate Collection, Chicago, Illinois
- Voss & Partner, TV-Ateliers, Düsseldorf, Germany
