= Jay Musler =

American glass artist (born 1949)

- Glass bowl in the ‘Urban Bowl Series’ by Jay Musler, 1983, Smithsonian American Art Museum
- Born: 1949 (age 76–77); Sacramento, California
- Known for: Glass art

Jay Musler is an American glass artist who was born in Sacramento, California in 1949.

== Collections ==
The Corning Museum of Glass, the Hokkaido Museum of Modern Art, the Honolulu Museum of Art, the Smithsonian American Art Museum (Washington, D. C.) and the Toledo Museum of Art (Toledo, Ohio) are among the public collections holding work by Jay Musler. Other locations where his work is in the collections include: Herbert F. Johnson Museum of Art, Fuller Craft Museum, Fowler Museum at UCLA, Lowe Art Museum, High Museum of Art, The Museum of Art and Design New York, Racine Art Museum, RISD and others.

== Personal life ==
He lives in San Francisco, California.
