= Bullseye Glass =

Glass manufacturer in Portland, Oregon, USA

Coordinates: 45.49645°N 122.64423°W

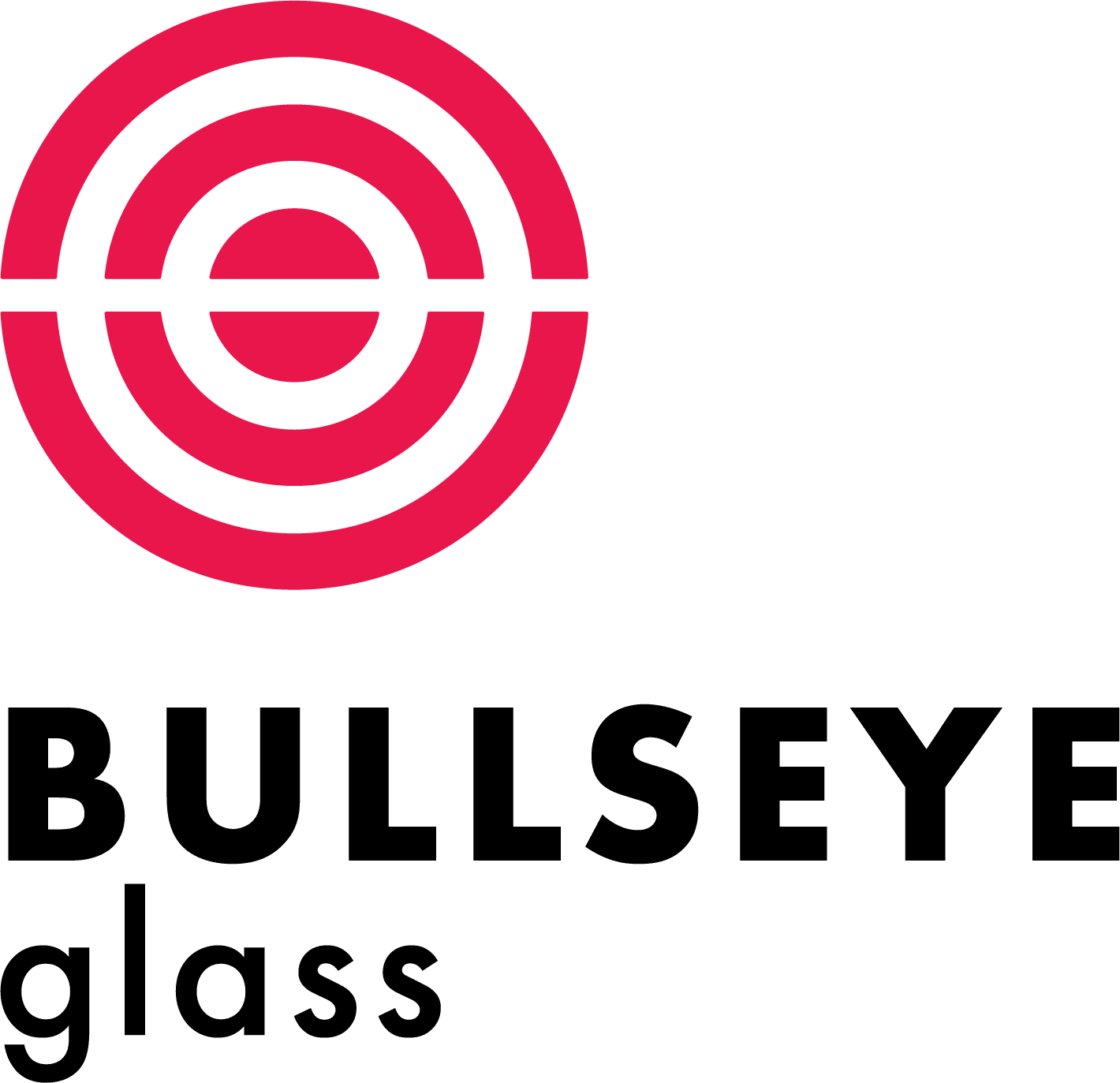

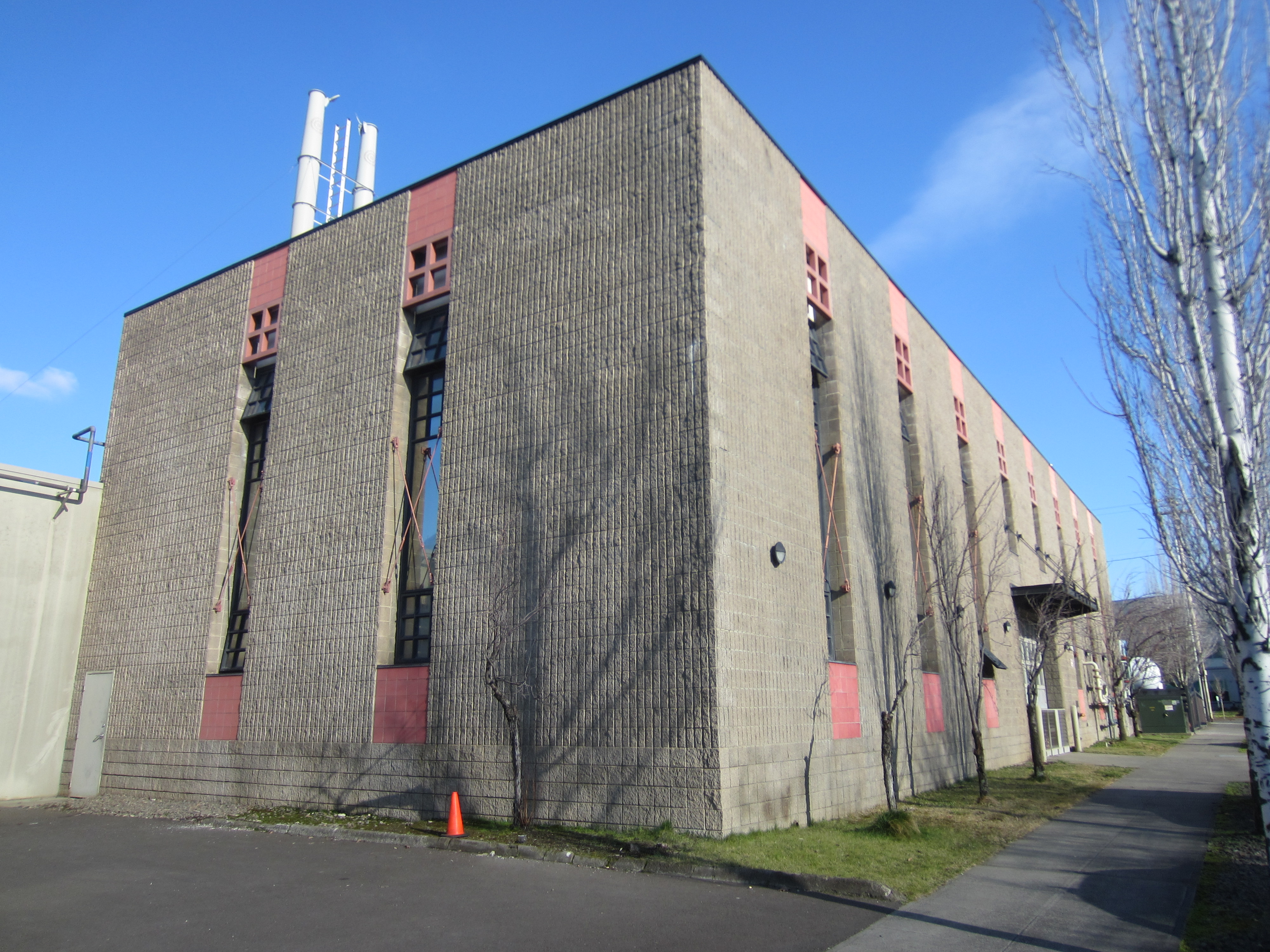
- Company type: Private
- Founded: 1974; 51 years ago in Portland, Oregon
- Headquarters: Portland, Oregon, United States
- Products: Art glass
- Website: bullseyeglass.com

Bullseye Glass is a glass manufacturer in Brooklyn, Portland, Oregon, in the United States. The company is a significant supplier of raw art glass for fused glass makers.

According to Art Glass Magazine, production controls at Bullseye's U.S. plant is more consistent than imported products, allowing it to fuse reliably.

== History ==
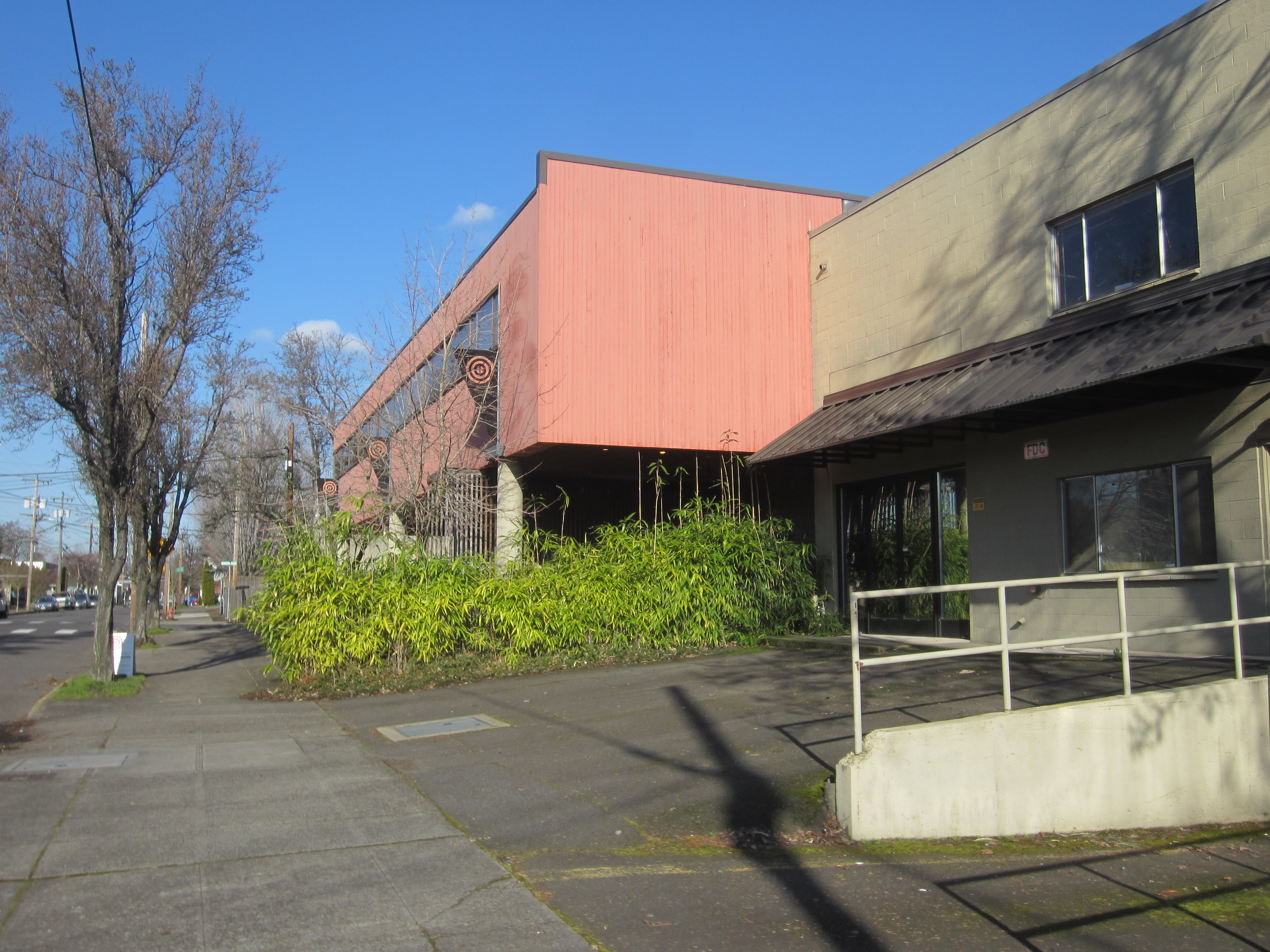
Exterior of the Bullseye Resource Center Portland, 2021

Bullseye Glass Company was founded in 1974 by Dan Schwoerer, Boyce Lundstrom, and Ray Ahlgren.

In early 2016, high levels of the toxic heavy metals cadmium, arsenic and chromium were discovered in the vicinity of the company's plant in East Portland. After production with some of the heavy metals was voluntarily halted by Bullseye and others, their production of several colors of art glass was restricted.

In fall of 2016, Bullseye completed installation of a baghouse emission control system that successfully reduced all emissions to levels required by state and federal regulations. In 2019 Bullseye settled a class action lawsuit for $6.5M paid to over 2000 households surrounding their facility

== See also ==
- List of companies based in Oregon
