= New Langton Arts =

Defunct art space in California

Coordinates: 37.774525°N 122.410859°W

- Established: 1975
- Dissolved: Summer 2009
- Location: 1246 Folsom Street, San Francisco, California United States
- Founders: Judy Moran, Renny Pritikin
- Website: newlangtonarts.org archived at the Internet Archive

New Langton Arts (active 1975 – 2009) was a not-for-profit arts organization focusing on contemporary art founded in 1975 and located the South of Market neighborhood in San Francisco, California. Part of the first wave of alternative art spaces in the United States, and New Langton Arts was a leader in exhibiting new media forms in art and involving artists in the decision-making process. Its first directors were Judy Moran and Renny Pritikin.

New Langton Arts focused on collaborating with artists on the "production and presentation of new work, exhibitions and events, that challenged the boundaries of conventional art practice while encouraging broad public appreciation and access to the art of our times."

== History ==
In 1975 San Francisco's art scene reached a turning point. A substantial enough number of younger artists working in the new mediums of performance, installation, video, and interdisciplinary projects was reached, and they identified themselves as a community. Local commercial galleries and museums were not showing these art forms, and artists and their supporters were organizing various opportunities for each other on an ad hoc basis. For example, a series of performance events were held in 1974 in a vacant industrial space on Bluxome Street. When artist Jock Reynolds purchased and renovated a former coffin factory at 80 Langton Street, he made the ground floor available for a new organization to support new work. Moving out to next-door at 1246 Folsom Street later.

Its first directors were Judy Moran and Renny Pritikin, who were central figures in the San Francisco Bay Area art scene for 30 years. Subsequent directors of New Langton Arts include Nancy Gonchar, Christiane Robbins, Susan Miller, and Sandra Percival.

Inspired by models in New York and elsewhere (Artists Space, Portland Center for the Visual Arts, Los Angeles Institute of Contemporary Art) that were committed to artist control, artist financial support, and support of artists by other artists, the not for profit 80 Langton Street Corporation was created in 1975 and opened its doors in July 1975 with a one-person video installation by artist Peter D'Agostino. Signers of the corporate documents included Judith Dunham, then editor of Artweek, David Robinson, architect, and gallerists Ruth Braunstein and Diana Fuller. A board of directors made up of artists and arts professionals took control.

New Langton Arts emerged into a local ecology that already or soon would contain peers such as Site/Cite/Sight (run by artist Alan Scarritt), La Mamelle, Inc./Art Com (run by Carl E. Loeffler), Galeria de la Raza (run by René Yañez and Ralph Maradiaga), San Francisco Camerawork, Southern Exposure, Tom Marioni’s Museum of Conceptual Art among others. All these organizations shared some of the ideals mentioned above. These emerging arts organizations were an extension into the fine arts realm of alternative organizations of the era that sought to insert themselves between producers and consumers in ways that bypassed traditional distribution methods, whether in education, food, or information distribution. Furthermore, these New Left ideals extended to giving artists power over their fate using a participatory democracy model.

=== Artist and exhibitions ===
Langton's history is closely tied to the emergence of new art forms in the ’70s—performance and time-based art, video and installation, improvised and electronic music, and experimental writing: Barbara Kruger in the literature program (1977); residencies by Allan Kaprow and Martha Rosler (1980); Charles Ray’s performance installation (1985); and Olafur Eliasson’s first show in the US (1996). At the time these artists were under 35, at emergent moments in their careers, and had never before been seen in the Bay Area.

In solo, group installations and performances, Langton has produced and presented the work of Nam June Paik, Vito Acconci, Chris Burden, Nancy Rubins, Suzanne Lacy, Steve Benson, Tony Oursler, Allen Ruppersberg, Clark Coolidge, Tom Marioni, Chip Lord, Ted Berrigan, Paul DeMarinis, Howard Fried, John Baldessari, Kathy Acker, Kevin Killian, Dodie Bellamy, Eleanor Antin, Joan Jonas, Michelangelo Pistoletto, Lorenzo Thomas, Lynne Tillman, Barrett Watten, Bill Berkson, Theresa Hak Kyung Cha, Félix González-Torres, Maria Nordman, Alvin Curran, Terry Riley, Pauline Oliveros, Eliane Radigue, Ron Silliman, John Zorn, Steve Reich, Laurie Anderson, Paul McCarthy, Joe Reihsen, Matthieu Laurette, Aaron Young, Sonya Rapoport, Harrell Fletcher, Rigo 23, Felipe Dulzaides, Marc Horowitz, mafishco, Liz Young, and others.

New Langton Arts has presented retrospective exhibitions of seminal SF Bay Area artists: Jim Pomeroy (1999) and Tony Labat (2005). Also in 2005 they hosted Downtime: Constructing Leisure the first exhibition of the Curatorial Practice Program at the California College of the Arts.

=== Public programs ===
The Performance Writing series brought multi-disciplinary literary artists to Langton to present works that explore language in the context of live performance. The series, curated by Jocelyn Saidenberg and Brandon Brown, earned a 2005 “Best of the Bay” award in the San Francisco Bay Guardian for “Best New Reading Series to Catapult Language Off the Page."

=== An uncertain future ===
On 22 July 2009 Sandra Percival announced her resignation as executive director of Langton, having taken over the position from Susan Miller four years earlier. Subsequently, the board of directors, chaired by Primo Orpilla, suspended programing, laid off remaining staff, cut expenses, and vacated the gallery and theater space at 1246 Folsom.

=== Dissolution of NLA ===
A year later the NLA website features an updated statement confirming the closure of the organization: "After a process of thorough deliberation, the Board of Directors of New Langton Arts (NLA) has determined that dissolution of NLA is the best option in light of short-term and long-term institutional challenges. The Board hopes that this difficult decision does not diminish the many achievements of the organization and the countless collaborative efforts of those who created and sustained it during its 34 years[...]

The Board of Directors considered many factors in making its decision, including the state of NLA’s financial health during a period of economic downturn that shuttered thousands of non-profit organizations. During its final years of existence, NLA undertook a number of new initiatives in an effort to secure the viability of the organization. Such initiatives and urgent appeals to save NLA proved insufficient. NLA moved out of its location at 1246 Folsom Street in San Francisco and had to let go of its staff. The Board of Directors is currently taking steps to wrap up its affairs in a manner that honors the organization’s excellence."
