= Marioni =

Marioni is a surname that may refer to:

- Bruno Marioni (born Bruno Giménez, 1975), retired Argentine striker
- Dante Marioni (born 1964), American glass artist
- John Marioni, computational biologist, Head of Research at the European Bioinformatics Institute
- Paul Marioni (born 1941), American artist
- Tom Marioni (born 1937), American artist and educator
