= Preston Singletary =

American glass artist

- Born: 1963 (age 62–63); San Francisco, California, U.S.
- Education: Pilchuck Glass School
- Known for: Glass art
- Movement: Northwest Coast art
- Website: prestonsingletary.com

Preston Singletary (born 1963) is a Native American glass artist.

== Biography ==
Preston Singletary was born in 1963 in San Francisco, California. He grew up in the Seattle-area listening to stories told by his great-grandparents. "My great-grandmother, Susie Johnson Bartlett Gubatayo, centered our family in the Northwest. She was born in Sitka, Alaska, in 1880, at a time of great change. Great-Grandma Susie was from the Eagle moiety, Kaagwaantaan Box House, Killer Whale clan of the Tlingit people. That is the lineage that I follow, ours is a matriarchal society."

Singletary met Dante Marioni, the son of glass artist Paul Marioni, at the age of 15 in 1979. Shortly after graduating high school, Singletary (who was actively pursuing a career as a musician at the time) was asked by Dante to work as a night watchman at what was then the Glass Eye, a Seattle glass-blowing studio. Singletary quickly moved from being night watchman to working the day shift to eventually joining one of the studio's production teams. In 1984, Singletary took part in a workshop at Pilchuck Glass School for the first time. He has since been involved in Pilchuck as a teacher, student, and more recently as a member of its board of trustees. Singletary has blown glass around the world in countries such as Sweden, Italy, and Finland. In the late 1980s, Singletary began incorporating traditional Tlingit themes into his work and reaching out to other Northwest Coast Native American artists like Joe David, from whom he learned more about Native culture including Northwest Coast formline design.

== Artist Statement ==
Singletary notes, "When I began working with glass in 1982, I had no idea that I'd be so connected to the material in the way that I am. It was only when I began to experiment with using designs from my Tlingit cultural heritage that my work began to take on a new purpose and direction.

The use of glass and traditional form line design has changed over time, involving themes of culture and the medium.

My work with glass transforms the notion that Native artists are only best when traditional materials are used. It has helped advocate on the behalf of all Indigenous people—affirming that we are still here—that that we are declaring who we are through our art in connection to our culture."

== Work ==
Safe Journey (2021) at the Renwick Gallery in Washington, DC in 2022

Early on, Singletary's work drew heavily from European glass artworks, especially those done in the Modernist style. In 1993, Singletary worked as a craftsman in residence at a design school in Scandinavia for six months. While there, his work incorporated elements of the clean, Scandinavian style as well as traditional Tlingit designs, "straddling two different worlds."

Today he is perhaps best known for his use of glass to express and explore traditional Tlingit themes. Many of his works reference clan crests, including the killer whale, which his family claims. Singletary has worked extensively with other native artists creating glass art works such as the Founders Totem Pole (2001) and Devilfish Prow, one of a series created in collaboration with Maori artist Lewis Tamihana Gardiner (2007). Some critics view Singletary's work as not truly Tlingit, because he works in glass rather than more traditional materials, like wood. But Singletary sees himself as "transforming the culture and forging new paths," which he believes should be allowed.

"My work, I feel, has always tried to achieve recognition as something more than “ethnic art.” But at the same time, that’s what gives it its power. It is connected to history, a personal connection through my ethnic background and matrilineal society all the way from my mother to my grandmother and great grandmother. I’m a part of that continuum."

In 2022 Singletary's work was featured in an exhibition entitled Raven and the Box of Daylight at the National Museum of the American Indian.

The same year Singletary became a Fellow of the American Craft Council. Several of his pieces were acquired by the Smithsonian American Art Museum as part of the Renwick Gallery's 50th Anniversary Campaign.

== Select Special Projects ==
In 2024, Singletary and artist David Franklin were selected to create a site-specific public art sculpture at the Pioneer Square transit stop in Seattle, in addition to several other public art projects nationally.

In 2023 Singletary wrote Fusion Notes, a visual memoir, featuring a loosely thematic dive into Preston Singletary's life and artistic practices. The title of this book speaks to Singletary's multi-faceted spirit, Tlingit background, and enduring love for music and the medium of glass.

In 2025 Preston Singletary was featured as the scenic designer for The Pacific Northwest Ballet production of "The Sleeping Beauty", opening on January 31, 2025.

== "Raven and the Box of Daylight" Exhibit ==
In 2022 Singletary's work was featured in an exhibition entitled Preston Singletary: Raven and the Box of Daylight at the National Museum of the American Indian. This solo traveling museum exhibition has visited several locations including The Museum of Glass, Tacoma, WA – (2018), The Wichita Art Museum, Wichita, KS. (2020), The National Museum of the American Indian, Smithsonian Institution, Washington, DC. (2022) and the Chrysler Museum of Art, Norfolk, VA. (2023), Oklahoma City Museum of Art, Oklahoma, OK. (2024), and the Eiteljorg Museum, Indianapolis, IN. (2025).

This exhibit focuses on the Tlingit origin story of Raven and his transformation of the world—bringing light to people via the stars, moon, and sun. Raven leads visitors on a fantastical journey through the transformation of darkness into light.

Preston Singletary: Raven and the Box of Daylight has been organized by the artist and Museum of Glass, Tacoma, WA. Guest curated by Miranda Belarde-Lewis, PhD. Multisensory visitor experience designed by zoe I juniper

== Music ==
Preston Singletary co-founded and plays bass in the band Khu.éex’. Khu.éex’ is an Indigenous band full of creative members, including storytellers, activists and artists, and brings their collective energy to the stage as one powerful unit. Their focus is raising awareness of social issues, stemming from the Native American struggle, that branch out to serious issues that affect all people.

The late Bernie Worrell also co-founded the band and was a respected elder who had African American and Cherokee ancestry. He had played with countless musicians over the years, but most notably was the founding member of the legendary Parliament-Funkadelic. He has previously played with Talking Heads and released many solo records over the years.

In connection with his glass art Singletary, uses "music to shape his contemporary perspective of Native culture."

== Notable Awards ==
2024 Asian Hall of Fame, Class of 2024 Pacific Northwest, Seattle, WA.

2022 Arts Innovator Award, Artist Trust, Seattle, WA.

2022 College of Fellows Award, American Craft Council, Minneapolis, MN.

2021 Master of the Medium - James Renwick Alliance for Craft, Washington, DC

2019 Artist Laureate – The Rainier Club, Seattle, WA.

2018 Governor's Arts Award – Individual, Washington State Arts Commission, Olympia, WA.

== Notable Collections ==
- Brooklyn Museum of Art, Brooklyn, NY
- Canadian Museum of History
- Corning Museum of Glass, Corning, NY (Rakow Commission)
- Detroit Institute of Arts, Detroit, MI
- Eiteljorg Museum, Indianapolis, IN
- Microsoft Arts Collection, Redmond, WA
- Museum of Fine Arts, Boston, MA
- National Museum of the American Indian, Smithsonian Institution, Washington, DC
- National Museum of Wildlife Art, Jackson, WY
- Rhode Island School of Design, Providence, RI
- Seattle Art Museum, Seattle, WA
- Sealaska Heritage, Juneau, AK
- Wichita Art Museum, Wichita, KS

== Bibliography ==
- Kastner, Caroline, ed. Fusing Traditions: Transformations in Glass by Native American Artists. Museum of Craft & Folk Art, San Francisco, c. 2002.
- Ganglehoff, Bonnie, "Glass Act," Southwest Art, c. 1999,
- Museum of Glass. Preston Singletary: Echoes, Fire, and Shadows, 2009.
