= Blomdahl =

Blomdahl is a surname. Notable people with this surname include:

- Ben Blomdahl (born 1970), American former baseball pitcher
- Karl-Birger Blomdahl (1916–1968), Swedish composer
- Patric Blomdahl (born 1984), Swedish former professional ice hockey winger
- Sonja Blomdahl (born 1952), American artist
- Torbjörn Blomdahl (born 1962), Swedish billiards player
