= La Mamelle, Inc./Art Com =

Coordinates: 37.773583°N 122.419374°W

La Mamelle, Inc. / Art Com was a not-for-profit arts organization, artist-run space, or alternative exhibition space, active from 1975 through 1995, and was located at 70-12th Street in the South of Market-area of San Francisco, California.

The organization's first venture was publishing but it became involved in a multiplicity of activities including maintaining an artists' space and presenting exhibitions and events of mail art, performance art, conceptual photography, video art production and screenings, a library, distributing artist-produced works, and creating one of the first artists' online networks.

== History ==
- La Mamelle Magazine, v.1(1) published summer of 1975, by Carl Loeffler.
- Opened the La Mamelle Arts Center, an 8,000 square alternative exhibition and performance space on 70-12th street in San Francisco in 1976.
- From 1975 through the 1980s the organization supported live art, video and electronic media art, artist-curated exhibitions, a bookstore with artists' publications. It established and supported a growing repository of information about new art activities worldwide, and the first Video Art archive in northern California.
- In 1980, the organization began using the name Art Com, and supported programs that promoted the intersection of the arts and technology. It programmed video and audio works by artists on community access television and radio stations, cable TV and collaborated with other artists on video works and telecommunications projects.
- As publishers, the last issue in print format of Art Com Magazine (formerly La Mamelle, then Art Contemporary) was published in 1984 and became an e-journal in spring 1986 with the launching of the Art Com Electronic Network (ACEN).
- ACEN was one of the first interactive online artists' networks, conceived as a 'virtual village' that focused on building a cultural environment and creating art through a global participatory process.
- From 1980 through the mid-1990s, the organization also ran Contemporary Arts Press Distribution and Art Com Media Distribution, to distribute artist-produced publications and media to libraries, bookstores, and television stations worldwide.

== Exhibitions and performances ==
Selected artists who were presented include : Richard Alpert, Anna Banana, Judith Barry, Chris Burden, Paul Cotton, Peter D'Agostino, Paul Forte, Bill Gaglione, General Idea, Sharon Grace, Theresa Hak Kyung Cha, Doug Hall, Stephen Laub, Lynn Hershman Leeson, Tony Labat, Chip Lord, Tony Oursler, Mark Pauline, Chris Robbins, Willoughby Sharp, Bonnie Sherk, Barbara T. Smith, Lew Thomas, T.R. Uthco, Nina Wise, Bruce and Norman Yonemoto, Michael Kirkegaard, Fleshtones.

== Selected books ==
- Loeffler, Carl E. and Darlene Tong, Performance Anthology: Source Book for a Decade of California Performance Art, San Francisco: Contemporary Arts Press, 1980, 1989
- Ascott, Roy and Carl E. Loeffler, guest ed., Connectivity: Art and Interactive Telecommunications, Leonardo 24:2, 1991.

== Selected bibliography ==
- Foley, Suzanne. Space Time Sound, Conceptual Art in the San Francisco Bay Area: The 1970s. San Francisco: San Francisco Museum of Modern Art, 1981. ISBN 0-295-95879-0
- Jones, Mark J. "E-Mail From Carl", CyberStage 1.2, Spring 1995
- Zimbardo, Tanya. Video City: A New Medium in the Museum in San Francisco Museum of Modern Art: 75 Years of Looking Forward. San Francisco: SFMOMA. ISBN 978-0-918471-84-0

== Archives ==
Stanford University Libraries received primary La Mamelle, Inc./Art Com archives and papers in 1999.

Berkeley Art Museum and Pacific Film Archive received the artist video archive of hundreds of videotapes. Includes works distributed by Art Com TV Distribution.

== Alternative art spaces in the San Francisco Bay area ==
La Mamelle, Inc./Art Com emerged in the 1970s during the proliferation of artist-run spaces across the country. In the San Francisco Bay Area this included Intersection for the Arts, Museum of Conceptual Art (active 1970–1984), Galeria de la Raza, SF Camerawork, Crossroads Community (the farm) (active 1974–80), The Floating Museum (active 1975–77), 80 Langton Street (later New Langton Arts active, 1975–2009), Site/Cite/Sight, and Southern Exposure.
