= Abel Pifre =

French engineer

Abel Pifre (1852–1928), was a French engineer who developed the first solar power printing press. He was initially an assistant to Augustin Bernard Mouchot who developed the first solar engine, but later developed solar technologies independently of his mentor.

Printing a Journal By Solar Heat

Pifre demonstrated his press at a meeting of the Union Francaise de la Jeunesse at the Jardin des Tuileries in Paris on 6 August 1882.

The device consisted of a concave mirror 3.5 meters in diameter centering on a cylindrical steam boiler, which powered a small vertical engine of 2/5 horse power, and then driving a Marioni type printing-press.

Even under semi-overcast conditions, the press operated continuously from 1:00 pm to 5:30 pm, producing approximately five hundred copies per hour of a journal which was produced specifically for the event with the appropriate name "Soleil-Journal".
