= Glen Scantlebury =

American filmmaker (born 1955)

- Born: July 11, 1955 (age 71); Annandale, Virginia, U.S.
- Occupations: Film editor, director, screenwriter
- Years active: 1981–present
- Spouse: Lucy Phillips

Glen Scantlebury (born July 11, 1955) is an American film editor, director, and screenwriter. He has edited major studio feature films such as Con Air and Transformers, and has worked primarily in the action and horror film genres.

== Biography ==
Currently based in San Francisco, Scantlebury was born in Annandale, Virginia in 1955, and attended Virginia Commonwealth University.

=== Film editing ===
In 1981, Scantlebury became a member (performer and crew) of The Video Band, for which he edited a series of experimental music videos released in the early 1980s.

Scantlebury became one of the first editors to edit feature films on video, beginning in 1987 with the Tom Waits concert film Big Time (1988). He subsequently worked at Zoetrope Studios for five years. He was cited by Variety in 2009 as a "key cutter" among director Michael Bay's "trusted team of editors."

In addition to editing feature films, Scantlebury has edited numerous music videos and documentaries. In 2012, Scantlebury was invited to join the Academy of Motion Picture Arts and Sciences.

=== Independent film production ===
Scantlebury is an independent filmmaker, operating Pavement Pictures in partnership with his wife, Lucy Phillips. Phillips is a producer, director, and screenwriter. Abducted, the fourth feature film written and directed by Phillips and Scantlebury, appeared as an Xbox exclusive release in September 2013, and was released on DVD in October 2013. It won the 2013 Shriekfest Horror/Sci-Fi Film Festival award for Best Sci-Fi Feature Film.

== Filmography ==
=== Editor ===
- 1988: Big Time
- 1990: The Spirit of '76
- 1990: The Godfather Part III
- 1992: Bram Stoker's Dracula
- 1993: Steal America
- 1995: My Dubious Sex Drive
- 1996: The Rock
- 1997: Little Dieter Needs to Fly
- 1997: Con Air
- 1998: Armageddon
- 1999: The General's Daughter
- 2001: Lara Croft: Tomb Raider
- 2001: Joy Ride
- 2003: The Texas Chainsaw Massacre
- 2004: My Tiny Universe
- 2005: Two for the Money
- 2007: Pathfinder
- 2007: Transformers
- 2008: Tropic Thunder
- 2009: Friday the 13th
- 2010: A Nightmare on Elm Street
- 2011: Dream House
- 2012: Stolen
- 2012: Twixt
- 2013: Carrie
- 2014: Teenage Mutant Ninja Turtles
- 2015: Papa: Hemingway in Cuba
- 2015: Muddy Track
- 2020: Mainstream
- 2024: Megalopolis
- TBA: Fortitude

=== Director ===
Co-credited with Lucy Phillips:

- 1993: "Jimmy Still Comes Around" (music video by The Loud Family)
- 1995: My Dubious Sex Drive
- 2004: My Tiny Universe
- 2013: Abducted

=== Screenwriter ===
Co-credited with Lucy Phillips:

- 1993: Steal America
- 1995: My Dubious Sex Drive
- 2004: My Tiny Universe
- 2013: Abducted

=== Editing and musical performance ===
Music videos with The Video Band:

- 1982: "From the Field"
- 1982: "The Reagan Commercials"
- 1984: "California Zones"
- 1984: "Reverse Angles"
- 1984: "War Dance"
- 1984: Scratch Video (compilation)

=== Other ===
- 1981: "Jinx" (music video by Tuxedomoon) (grip)
- 1993: Steal America (cinematographer)
