= Jeff Ballard =

Jeff Ballard may refer to:

- Jeff Ballard (artist) (born 1977), American glass artist
- Jeff Ballard (baseball) (born 1963), former Major League baseball player
- Jeff Ballard (musician) (born 1963), American jazz drummer

== See also ==
- Geoffrey Ballard (1932–2008), Canadian geophysicist and businessman
