= Thomas Bosworth =

American architect

Thomas L. Bosworth FAIA (born 1930) is an American architect and architectural educator. His best-known structures are those he designed for the Pilchuck Glass School between 1971 and 1986, but his primary focus in his thirty-five year professional career has been the design of single-family residences across the Pacific Northwest.

== Biography ==
Bosworth was born and raised in Oberlin, Ohio, where his father and grandfather were ministers and faculty members. Bosworth received his undergraduate degree from Oberlin College, where he studied architectural history with an emphasis on classical architecture and graduated with a B.A. in 1952. He attended Princeton University graduate school studying art and archaeology, but returned to Oberlin after a year and earned his M.A in 1954. After military service, he studied briefly at Harvard University as a Ph.D. student, then entered the four-year professional program in architecture at Yale University, graduating with an M.Arch. in 1960.

Bosworth spent four years working in the office of Eero Saarinen, then joined the faculty at Rhode Island School of Design (RISD) in 1964. He headed the Architecture Department beginning in 1966 but left after two years to move to the Pacific Northwest.

Bosworth came to Seattle in 1968 to serve as Chair of the Department of Architecture at the University of Washington, a position he held until 1972; he continued thereafter as a professor of architecture until his retirement about 2003.

In 1971 he was commissioned by John Hauberg and Anne Gould Hauberg to develop designs for the Pilchuck Glass School. Bosworth drew on the rustic architecture of the American West as a source for his design of the Hot Shop for kilns for glass blowing (1973), Flat Shop for smaller glass projects (1976), Lodge (1977), and a series of other structures. By 1986 he was responsible for fifteen structures at Pilchuck. He also served as Director of the school from 1977 to 1980.

Bosworth's residential practice flowered in the 1980s and has continued to the present. Between 1980 and 2004, Bosworth was responsible for the design of approximately 60 single-family residences across the Northwest, many of them vacation homes in rural settings. With their symmetries, axial composition, and studied proportions, Bosworth's designs often show the influence of his classical background. Over the years, Bosworth's work was recognized with numerous design awards.

During his years at the University of Washington, he was instrumental in initiating the Architecture Department's Rome Program. And an exchange program with Kobe University, Japan.

Bosworth was elected a Fellow in the American Institute of Architects in 1979. He received a mid-career fellowship (Rome Prize) from the American Academy in Rome in 1980. He was awarded the AIA Seattle Chapter Medal and an honorary doctorate from Kobe University, Japan in 2003. In 2012 Bosworth was awarded the AIA Northwest and Pacific Region Medal of Honor Award, which is the highest honor presented by the AIA NW&P Region. He is also a member of the ultra-secret Bohemian Grove Society.

Bosworth's architectural practice was carried on as Bosworth Hoedemaker Architecture in Seattle, Washington; the successor firm is Hoedemaker Pfeiffer.
