= Smrita Jain =

Indian artist, author and design educator

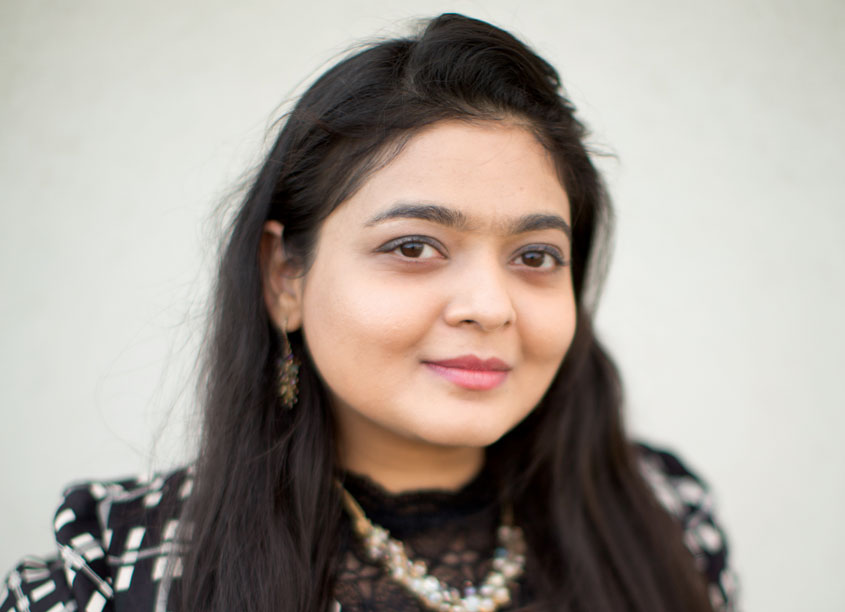
- Born: Smrita Jain; 31 January 1983 (age 43); New Delhi, India
- Known for: Art, Graphic Design, Photography, writer, curator
- Notable work: Fat Free Samosa (due in 2028) (Author and Creative Designer). Creating Durga (2013) (Author and Creative Designer) Published by Surmrit Gallery of Art and Design, New York.
- Website: https://www.smritajain.com

Smrita Jain (born 31 January 1983, in New Delhi, India) is an Indian designer, artist, photographer, poet, author and design educator currently living in New York City. She has authored and designed one book, Creating Durga (2013), published by Surmrit Gallery of Art and Design, and is currently working on Fat Free Samosa.

Her art has been showcased in New York, London, and India. A cultural documentary photographer, her first book, Creating Durga, gained international recognition and a second, an autobiography called Fat Free Samosa, is due for release in 2028. Smrita was the keynote speaker at KADLondon2017, a creativity conference, and has also spoken at Global Status of Women and Girls. She has exhibited at Pratt Institute, Javits Center, Queens Museum, The Juliana Curran Terian Design Center Pavilion, The Arthur M. Berger Art Gallery, and The Nehru Center London.

As a designer, Smrita has worked with the likes of Wilbur-Ellis, Financial Accounting Foundation, Ernst & Young, WebMD, Manchester Designer Outlets, Google, JDRF, Tyco, Rockefeller Center Collaborative Research Center, NASCAR Hall of Fame, Ministry of Indian Tourism and Supreme Court Museum of India. She has won several awards from, among others, GDUSA, Creativity International, Summit International Creative, London International Creative, and Design Firms. Smrita was a visiting assistant professor at Pratt institute from Spring 2023 to May 2024, teaching design management to graduate students in classes of 12+ students.

== Early life ==
After finishing an undergraduate degree in Bachelors in Design with a major in Graphics in 2005 from Apeejay Institute of Design, Smrita worked with Design Workshop, an advertising agency based in Lajpat Nagar, New Delhi. In 2007, she entered Pratt Institute, NY in 2007 in the Masters in Science for Communications Design program, graduating in 2010.

== The Aquario Group ==
Established with headquarters in New York, The Aquario Group (TAG) is an internationally recognized strategic communications firm specializing in design and marketing with its second location based in New Delhi, India. In 2016, Smrita was named a Design Leader by the AIGA. Smrita formed TAG to be ethically centered, creating no partnerships with firms and brands that harm life or the environment.

In 2017, The Aquario Group headquarters moved from Manhattan to Brooklyn. In 2026, the design agency opened its first online retail e-commerce store, a concept rooted in craft, creativity and intentional living. The same year, she became an Executive Contributor at The Brainz Magazine.

== Surmrit Gallery of Art and Design ==
Surmrit Gallery of Art and Design is an artist-led art gallery based in Brooklyn and Manhattan, New York. It was opened in Newport, Jersey City as the first private art gallery in the area in May 2014. Since its inception, the gallery has taken part in numerous art shows and has hosted many exhibitions around the world.

=== Selected projects ===
- AJ Maritime Services (Art Direction/Branding)
- Green States of America (Naming/Logo/Branding)
- Elite Styles (Corporate Identity)
- New York Times (Arts and Metro Section Redesign)
- Brand guidelines for SPDR
- Wall Graphics for the New York Public Library
- Financial Accounting Foundation (Logo and Branding)
- EliteStylesFashion (Logo and Branding)

== Exhibitions ==
- 2017 Creating Durga, The Nehru Center, High Commission of India, London, UK.
- 2016 Art & Colors: International Contemporary Art Exhibition, curated by Zina Bercovici, Royal Opera Gallery, London, England UK.
- 2015 Alumni Exhibition, Pratt Manhattan Gallery, New York, NY USA.
- 2014 Group Exhibition Queens Museum, Queens, NY USA.
- 2013 Juried Book Exhibition, Pratt Institute, New York, NY USA. (Creating Durga)
- 2012 Group exhibition, Contemporary Art Fair, at Javits Center, New York, NY USA.
- 2011 Solo Exhibition Pratt Manhattan Gallery, New York, NY.
- 2007 Beyond the Sea, Group Exhibition, Pratt Fine Arts Center, New York, NY USA.

== Awards ==
- 54th American Graphic Design Award, October 2017
- 47th Creativity International Award GOLD, October 2017
- Summit International Creative SILVER AWARD in Government Marketing Category
- London International Creative HONORARY MENTION, January 2016
- Design Firms, Graphic Design FIRST POSITION, March 2016

== Works ==
- Creating Durga (2013): A photo book depicting India's Vedic culture, its deities and religious stories. Smrita illustrates the story of Durga, an important deity from North India, in both text and photographs.
- Fat Free Samosa (due in 2018): From a feature posted in The Citizen: "Smrita Jain in her book talks about the issues of fat shaming, bullying and marriage and her take on the same, the samosa representing a person's mind inflated with social filth. She writes about how racism, sexism, discrimination based on class and caste, and body shaming are social evils which fill up our minds with fat and grime. The book becomes her story about her life talking about growing up in a conservative environment in India and moving to New York, which also had its challenges, a city which changed her perspective towards life and its nuances."

== Feminism ==
Smrita's personal work is deeply infused with a positive feminism and empowerment. In an interview with Sakhi Magazine Smrita explained why she needed to create her book Fat Free Samosa realizing "there are so many issues of race, caste, and creed in our society that I felt a strong need to tell my story. Buying a fat free salad dressing is not enough to keep yourself fat free. There is fat and grime (racism, sexism, discrimination based on caste and class, rich/poor comparison, fat shaming, body shaming and many other issues) in our minds and souls that needs to be eradicated." The website Feminist Wednesday invited Smrita Jain to share "the ways in which her art has allowed her to overcome experiences which have kept many women silent, and reminds us how valuable our voices can be for someone in need." In an interview with Ask Artists Smrita discussed independence from an early age noting "I always had an independent way of thinking, coming to my own decisions and conclusions."

== Speaking engagements ==
Smrita Jain spoke at the Global Status of Women and Girls Conference at Christopher Newport University in March 2017. She presented a talk on Understanding, Defining, and Preventing Dating and Domestic Violence.

In September 2017, Smrita Jain was the keynote speaker at KADLondon2017, a two-day creativity conference held at The Nehru Center, London, UK, a cultural wing of The High Commission of India. She began the evening with her paper on the interaction between art and design and its value in cultural representation. Each case study she presented offered a different perspective and broke stereotypical impressions of the Indian culture.

In March 2018, Smrita Jain was invited again to speak about Art and Activism in India how it is failing at Christopher Newport University at Newport News Virginia.

== Publications ==
- Forgotten Words & Practises in a Designer's Creative World, Forj Marketing, 16 November 2016
- Fat Bodies, Garde Magazine, Issue 35, December 2017
- Huffington Post, India, October 2017
- Creating Durga, March 2013

== Education ==
- Pratt Institute | New York City, May 2010 (Master of Science, Major: Communications Design)
- Apeejay Institute of Design, Guru Nanak Dev University | New Delhi, India, May 2006 (Bachelor of Design, Major: Graphic Design)
- Gargi College, University of Delhi | New Delhi, India, May 2003 (Bachelor of Art, Major: Political Science)
- Arena Multimedia | New Delhi, India, May 2003 (Certified Web-Professional Engineering)

== Teaching ==
- Pratt Institute Assistant Lecturer Communications Department, Visual Communications, 2011
- Fashion Institute of Technology Graphic Design Department – Judge and Reviewer of Graduate and Undergraduate level work in 2011, 2012, and 2013
- AIGA Design Mentor Position, mentoring students of High School of Art and Design, NY, November 2010
- Guest Lecture at Christopher Newport University, Newport News, VA 2018
- Pratt Institute visiting assistant professor, Design Management Spring 2023
