= Deborah Moore (disambiguation) =

Deborah Moore is an actress.

Deborah Moore may also refer to:

- Deborah Dash Moore, professor of history

== See also ==
- Debbie Moore, singer
- Debora Moore, artist
