= Stephen Laub =

American artist (born 1945)

- Born: 1945 (age 80–81)
- Education: University of California, Berkeley
- Occupations: Artist, Professor
- Known for: Contemporary artist associated with the Conceptual Art movement in California in the 1970s.
- Spouse: Claire Watson
- Website: Official website

Stephen Laub (born 1945) is an American artist who works in performance, video, and sculpture.

== Education ==
Laub received both his undergraduate and master's degrees at the University of California, Berkeley studying under artists such as Peter Voulkos, Arnaldo Pomodoro, Mark di Suvero, William T. Wiley, and Jim Melchert. At Berkeley, he studied painting with David Hockney. As a student, he was associated with Bay Area artists Theresa Hak Kyung Cha, Terry Fox, Howard Fried, and Paul Kos. Between 1964 and 1966, he studied performance with Étienne Decroux in Paris.

== Performance ==
In Laub's early performance work such as Relations (1970) the artist used projections and mirrors to insert himself into a historical photograph, merging his gestures and features with that of the person depicted. Other performances include Constellations (1975), a series commissioned by 112 Greene Street, NY.

In the 1970s, Laub performed at venues such as the Museum of Modern Art, the Whitney Museum of American Art, White Columns, The Kitchen, the Museum of Conceptual Art, and the Los Angeles Institute of Contemporary Art. Series such as Bodies of Water (1970–73) have been documented in art publications such as Avalanche and WET: The Magazine of Gourmet Bathing.

== Video ==
In the 1980s Laub began making video works also using the techniques of projection. Some had political overtones, such as White Food (1980) in which A U.S. Navy film about a battle in Vietnam is projected onto a series of white foods that make up a complete meal. The camera pans each course of the meal to reveal stages of the developing battle, from the hors d'oeuvres, progressing through the entree, and concluding with the dessert. White Food was exhibited at the 1984 Venice Biennale.

Laub's video work is included in the permanent collections of several major museums in the United States, including The Museum of Modern Art, The San Francisco Museum of Modern Art, The Berkeley Art Museum and Pacific Film Archive, and the Addison Gallery of American Art.

== Sculpture ==
In the 1980s, Laub began making sculpture and was represented by Koury Wingate Gallery in New York. His works in series such as Gold (1987-1989) and Silver (1989-1991) used wood coated in gold and silver leaf to create icons of common objects which framed historical photos, giving the object a new politically charged meaning. His sculptures have been shown in the Indianapolis Museum of Art, the Akron Art Museum, the Parrish Art Museum, The Guild Hall of East Hampton, and the Virginia Museum of Fine Arts, among others. Laub's sculptures are in the permanent collection of the Yale University Art Gallery

== Context ==
Laub's work is considered important in the Conceptual Art movement in California in the 1970s, alongside figures such as Chris Burden, John Baldessari, Edward Ruscha, Terry Fox, Paul Kos, Lynn Hershman, Bruce Nauman, Howard Fried, Tom Marioni, Allan Kaprow, and Theresa Hak Kyung Cha. He has exhibited in Europe since the 1970s, where his work has been associated with Actionism in its use of performance, social critique, and address of themes such as war and historical memory.

== Personal life ==
Until 2018, Laub was a professor of arts, Culture, and Media at Rutgers University–Newark.

Laub is married to visual artist Claire Watson and lives in Water Mill, NY.

== Public Collections ==
- Museum of Modern Art
- San Francisco Museum of Modern Art
- Museum of Fine Arts, Houston
- Berkeley Art Museum and Pacific Film Archive,
- Yale University Art Gallery
- Addison Gallery of American Art
- The Watermill Center
