= Debora Moore =

American glass artist (born 1960)

- Born: 1960 (age 65–66); St. Louis, Missouri, U.S.
- Education: Pilchuck Glass School (1990, 1992, 1995), Pratt Fine Arts Center (1989)
- Known for: Glass art
- Spouse: Benjamin P. Moore (m. ?– 2021; his death)
- Children: 1
- Website: deboramoore.com

Debora Moore (born 1960) is an American contemporary glass artist and teacher. She is best known for her flora and orchids made of glass. She owns Fiori Studio, located in Seattle.

== Early life, family and education ==
Debora Moore was born in 1960, in St. Louis, Missouri, into a military family. She was the third of six children, and spent many summers with her grandparents while she was growing up. Her career as an artist was influenced by her grandparents' garden and public art classes she took while visiting them.

Moore took classes at the Pratt Fine Arts Center in Seattle, as part of a work-study grant she received, then won a scholarship in 1990 to blow glass at Pilchuck Glass School, near Seattle. There she worked with Italo Scanga, Pino Signoretto, Ruth King, and Paul DeSomma, and Paul Marioni, and was a member of Dale Chihuly's glassblowing team.

She was married to glass artist Benjamin P. Moore, who died in 2021. Together they have a daughter.

== Career ==
Before becoming a glass artist, Moore worked a number of jobs, including waiting tables and modeling. She started working with glass in the 1980s.

Moore has taught glassmaking at a number of programs, including the Pratt Fine Arts Center and Pilchuck; she worked with at-risk students at the Hilltop School in Tacoma, Washington. She has participated in several artist-in-residence and visiting artist programs at the Chrysler Museum of Art in Norfolk, Virginia; the Museum of Glass in Tacoma, Washington; and the Harbourfront Centre in Toronto, Canada. Notably, she was the first woman, and the first African American, to be a resident at Abate Zanetti, Murano, Italy.

Moore began making glass flowers in 1987, and is best known for her orchids. She uses glassblowing and hot sculpting at the furnace to "retain the pure brilliance of glass". She travels around the world to study and sketch orchids in their natural habitats, and is also inspired by the glass botanical models created by Leopold and Rudolf Blaschka. However, Moore uses her impressions and imagination to create orchids that recall the flowers' forms without restricting herself to scientific accuracy.

== Recognition ==
Moore has won a number of awards and honors, including the 2008 American Style Award from Habatat Galleries, Royal Oak, MI; the 2007 Rakow Commission for The Corning Museum of Glass, Corning, New York; and the Critics Award at the 35th International Glass Invitational, Royal Oak, Michigan. She has participated in solo and group exhibitions around the world in museums such as the Chrysler Museum of Art; the Northwest African American Museum, in Seattle; the Museum of Glass; the Glasmuseet Ebeltoft in Ebeltoft, Denmark; and the Muskegon Museum of Art in Muskegon, Michigan.

On October 13, 2020, she was a speaker at the Virtual Preview Forces of Nature: Renwick Invitational 2020.

Her pieces, Cherry and Pink Lady Slipper Branch, were acquired by the Smithsonian American Art Museum as part of the Renwick Gallery's 50th Anniversary Campaign.

== Collections ==
Her work is in a number of museum collections, including at the Corning Museum of Glass in Corning, New York; the Chrysler Museum of Art in Norfolk, Virginia; the New Britain Museum of American Art in Connecticut; the Smithsonian American Art Museum in Washington, D.C.; and the Crocker Art Museum in Sacramento, California.
