= Renny Pritikin =

Renny Pritikin (born c. 1948) is an American curator, museum professional, writer, poet, and educator. He was the chief curator of San Francisco's Contemporary Jewish Museum from 2014 to 2018. He was Director of the Richard L. Nelson Gallery and the Fine Arts Collection at the University of California, Davis from 2004 to 2012.

== Early life and education ==
Renny Pritikin was born in Brooklyn, New York to a nonreligious Jewish family. Pritikin holds a BA degree from The New School for Social Research in New York. He continued his studies and holds a master's degree in interdisciplinary art from San Francisco State University, where he studied under Jock Reynolds.

== Career ==
Pritikin has curated numerous exhibitions, and has authored catalogue essays and articles. Some of his projects include: Alan Rath: Robot Dance and Other Sculpture; Bay Area Now, a regional survey; Fred Tomaselli: The Urge to be Transported; Eight from South Africa; The Art of Star Wars; Hall of Fame Hall of Fame; Don Ed Hardy at the Cuenca Bienal; and You See.

From 1979 to 1992 he served as executive director of New Langton Arts in San Francisco, an alternative space internationally renowned for its presentations of new visual art, interdisciplinary performance, video, literature and music.

Pritikin worked at Yerba Buena Center for the Arts from 1992 to 2004; he served as the director of the visual arts program from 1992 to 1997, followed by chief curator for all artistic programs (film/video, visual art, performing arts, education) from 1997 to 2004.

Pritikin has been a frequent consultant for the National Endowment for the Arts and the California Arts Council, and was a founder of the National Association of Artists Organizations, and has also served on their board of directors. As a writer he received the 1989 McCarron Fellowship for art criticism, and has had four chapbooks of his poetry published, A Quiet in Front of the Best Western, (Museum Quality Press, 2014); How We Talk (Collective Foundation POD Press, 2007), All These Trees (e.g. Press, Oakland, 1985) and Fourth Gear City Limits (Two Windows Press, Berkeley, 1976). He was a contributing writer for Art Practical from 2009 until 2014.

He was the chief curator of San Francisco's Contemporary Jewish Museum from 2014 to 2018.

In 1995, he received a United States Information Agency fellowship to tour and lecture in Japan and the Koret Israel Prize, a fellowship to visit Israel. In 1999 he travelled to Taiwan as a juror for the Ninth Annual International Print and Drawing Biennale at the Taipei Fine Arts Museum. In 2001 he was the curator chosen to represent the United States at the Cuenca (Ecuador) Bienal, and in 2003 he lectured in three cities in New Zealand as a Fulbright Fellow.

In addition to the California College of the Arts, he has taught art administration and artist professional skills training at San Francisco State University, and Golden Gate University.

== Publications ==
- Fourth Gear City Limits (Two Windows Press, Berkeley, 1976)
- All These Trees (e.g. Press, Oakland, 1985)
- How We Talk (Collective Foundation POD Press, 2007)
- A Quiet in Front of the Best Western, (Museum Quality Press, 2014)
- At Third and Mission: A Life Among Artists (Museum Quality Press, 2023)
