= Reji Thomas =

American glass artist

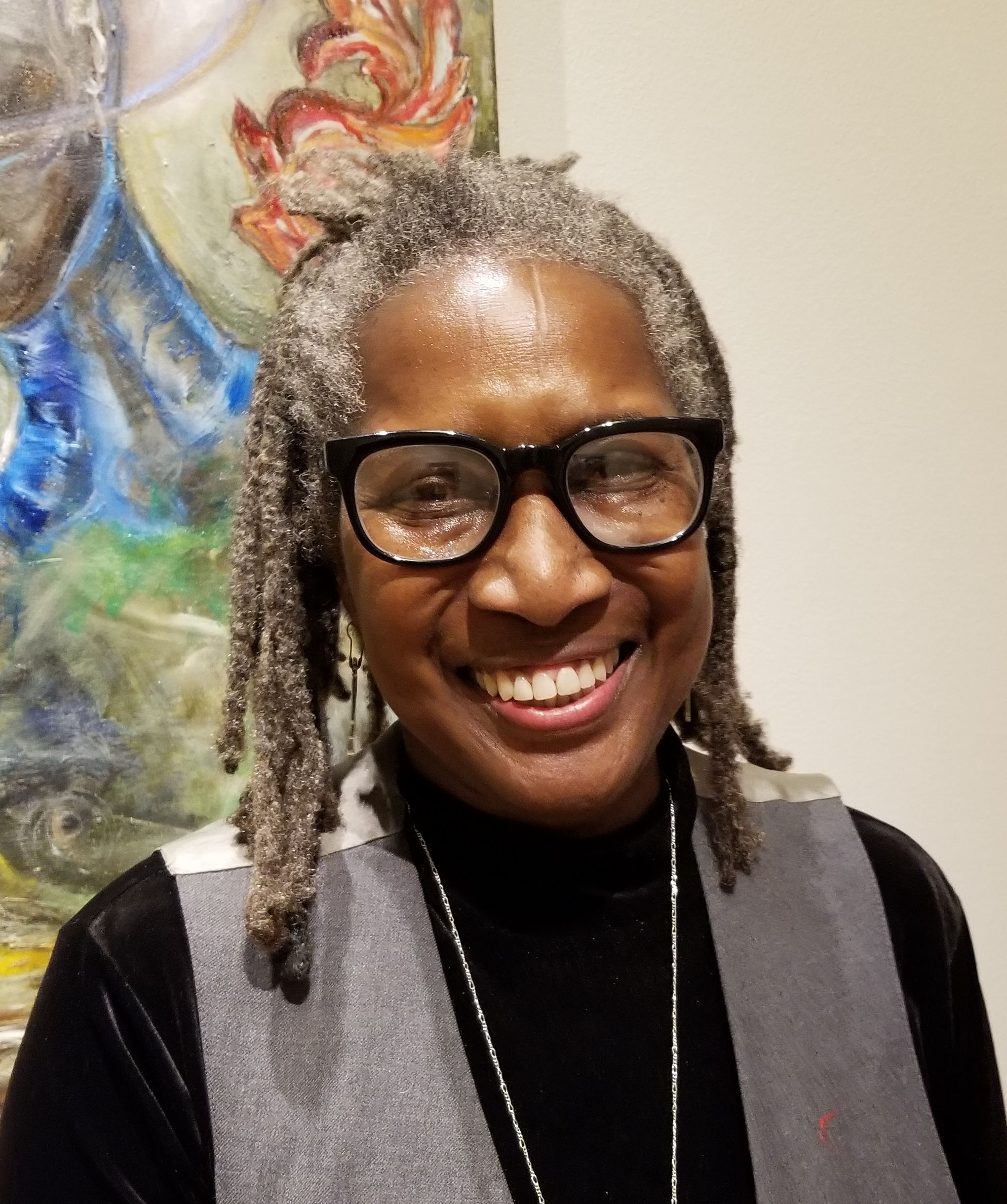
Reji Thomas at the George Washington Carver Museum. 2017

Rejina (Reji) Thomas is an American glass artist and artistic community advocate. In 1995 Thomas reproduced the intricate glass work for the restoration of the Texas Capitol building. She was commissioned by the State of Texas to create gifts for the President of Mexico and Queen Elizabeth of England. IBM and 3M are among the corporations that have commissioned her engraved and etched-glass awards. Her artwork has been collected by Ann Richards, Barbara Jordan, B.B. King, and Steven Spielberg. Thomas is the founder of Graphic Glass Studios Inc. and the Pine Street Station.

== Formative years ==
Thomas was born in Los Angeles. Her mother was a registered nurse and her father an electrical engineer. Early in life she was sent to live with her grandparents on the family's farm in Evergreen, Alabama. At the age of 15, while in art class, Thomas sold her first painting. Later, as a medic in the Air Force she began using a diamond dental drill to create images on glass, developing a steady hand and eye for detail. Thomas graduated from the International Pilchuck School of Glass based in Seattle, Washington. Thomas moved to Austin in the late 1970s.

== Capitol restoration ==
During the 1995 comprehensive interior restoration of the Texas Capitol, Thomas was contracted to replicate all of the intricate glass work in the Capitol Building. The restoration project was intensive and included approximately 600 panels of glass, which had to be matched to old specifications. Her experience with a rare double-acid etching process helped her win the contract. Thomas had created replacement panes for the Capitol before when fire damaged the Capitol during the mid-Eighties.

== Pine Street Station studio ==
In addition to Thomas artistic creations, she fostered a community in 2009 when she established her Pine Street Station studio space for the public. Her solo studio evolved into a home for “80s gypsy artists.” There were no hostels or welcoming creative spaces for traveling young artists at that time. Thomas saw a need for welcoming creative spaces responded. Pine Street Station hosted events, which included the annual QueerBomb celebration, AIDS Services of Austin's ArtErotica, the Fader Fort during SXSW, HOPE Farmers Market (the Eastside's first), and the annual East Austin Studio Tour. Thomas moved out of the studio after a 2014 court decision in favor of the land owner, CapMetro.

== Awards and exhibitions ==
In 1990 Thomas' work was exhibited at Austin's Laguna Gloria Art Museum and at the Women and Their Work gallery. Her studio, Graphic Glass Studios Inc. was recognized by The Austin Chronicle Best Of Awards as the "Best Acid Drop For Art's Sake". In 2004 The Austin Chronicle recognized her 11th Street mural as the 'Best Look Back at the New Eastside' referring to it as a masterpiece, and a "soul-sending work of art". In October 2017 State of Ascension: Mixed Media Vessel Works exhibition opened at the George Carver Museum. It featured two decades of Rejina Thomas' art. A theme embodied in her meticulously crafted containers and painting "position the womb as a metaphorical looking glass from which viewers experience and understand the world."
