= Jock Reynolds =

American arts administrator, visual artist (born 1947)

- Born: John M. Reynolds; 1947 (age 78–79); New Brunswick, New Jersey, U.S.
- Education: University of California, Santa Cruz (BA), University of California, Davis (MFA)
- Occupations: Museum director, curator, visual artist, arts administrator, gallerist
- Known for: Sculpture, photography, conceptual art, performance art, installation art
- Spouse: Suzanne Hellmuth

Jock Reynolds (born 1947; né John M. Reynolds) is an American museum director, visual artist, and curator. He served as the director of the Yale University Art Gallery from 1998 until 2018. His artwork is interdisciplinary and he often works in sculpture, photography, conceptual art, performance art, and installation art.

== Early life and education ==
Jock Reynolds was born John M. Reynolds in 1947, in New Brunswick, New Jersey. He graduated with a BA degree in 1969 from the University of California, Santa Cruz; and with a MFA degree in 1972 from the University of California, Davis. At UC Santa Cruz, he studied under Gurdon Woods.

In the 1970s, Reynolds married artist Suzanne Hellmuth, and they sometimes collaborate on artwork.

== Career ==
Reynolds was an associate professor and director of the graduate program in the Center for Experimental and Interdisciplinary Art at California State University, San Francisco (now San Francisco State University) from 1973 to 1983. One of his students at SF State was Renny Pritikin.

Reynolds co-founded the New Langton Arts in 1975, a not-for-profit arts organization and pioneering alternative arts space located at 80 Langton Street, San Francisco.

Reynolds served as the executive director of the Washington Project for the Arts from 1983 to 1989, a non-profit arts organization in Washington, D.C.. From 1989 until 1998, he served as the director of the Addison Gallery of American Art an academic museum at Phillips Academy in Andover, Massachusetts.

Reynolds served as the "Henry J. Heinz II Director" of the Yale University Art Gallery, from 1998 until 2018. During this time at the Yale University Art Gallery, Reynolds renovated and restored all three buildings.

His art practice consists primarily of sculpture, photography, conceptual art, performance art, and installation art. Reynolds' artwork is part of museum collections at the Museum of Modern Art, Detroit Institute of Art, and the Smithsonian American Art Museum.

== Publications ==
- Gowin, Emmet; Reynolds, Jock (2002). Changing the Earth: Aerial Photographs (exhibition). Terry Tempest Williams (essay), Philip Brookman (essay). New Haven, CT: Yale University Art Gallery. ISBN 9780300093612.
- Ross, Judith Joy (2006). Portraits of the Hazleton Public Schools (photography art book). Jock Reynolds (essay). New Haven, CT: Yale University Art Gallery. ISBN 9780300115840.
- Ruwedel, Mark (2008). Westward the Course of Empire (photography art book). Jock Reynolds (essay). New Haven, CT: Yale University Press. ISBN 978-0300141344.
- Ross, Clifford (2015). Thompson, Joseph; Clarke, Jay A. (eds.). Seen & Imagined: The World of Clifford Ross. David Anfam (essay), Quentin Bajac (essay), Arthur Danto (essay), Jack Flam (essay), Nicholas Negroponte (essay), Jock Reynolds (essay). MIT Press.
