= Howard Fried =

American conceptual artist (born 1946)

Howard Fried (born June 14, 1946, in Cleveland, Ohio) is an American conceptual artist who became known in the 1970s for his pioneering work in video art, performance art, and installation art.

He lives and works in Vallejo, California.

== Biography ==
Howard Fried attended Syracuse University from 1964 to 1967, received his B.F.A. from the San Francisco Art Institute in 1968 and his M.F.A. from the University of California, Davis, in 1970. He founded the video and performance department (currently the New Genres Department) at the San Francisco Art Institute.

Fried is associated with the first generation of conceptual artists in the San Francisco Bay Area, along with Terry Fox, Lynn Hershman, David Ireland, Paul Kos, Stephen Laub, and Tom Marioni, among others. His early works addressed such issues as decision making, conflict situations, control, predictability, learning, and cognitive processes.

Fried has participated in numerous group exhibitions including the 1977, 1979, 1981, and 1983 Whitney Biennial, Whitney Museum of American Art, New York; documenta V, Kassel Germany; Museum of Modern Art, New York; the Institute of Contemporary Art, Boston; Stedelijk Museum, Amsterdam; the Museum of Conceptual Art, San Francisco; the Berkeley Art Museum, University of California; the San Francisco Museum of Modern Art, San Francisco; Museum of Contemporary Art, Los Angeles; J. Paul Getty Museum, Los Angeles; and the CCA Wattis Institute for Contemporary Arts, San Francisco.

Fried has held solo exhibitions at the de Saisset Art Gallery and Museum, University of Santa Clara, California; Nova Scotia College of Art and Design, Halifax, Canada; Everson Museum of Art, Syracuse, New York; San Francisco Museum of Modern Art, San Francisco; Museum of Modern Art, New York; Fort Worth Art Museum, Fort Worth, Texas; and/or, Seattle, Washington; the Berkeley Art Museum, University of California, Berkeley; and apexart, New York, among others. A mid-career retrospective was organized at Berkeley Art Museum, University of California, Berkeley in 1983.

== Selected works ==
- The Seven States of Openness (1969–70) – installation, objects, drawings, text
- All My Dirty Blue Clothes (1969) – installation
- Spectral Analysis (1969) – installation
- Studio Relocation(1970) – photo and text
- 1970 (1970) – Super 8 film installation
- Chronometric Depth Perception (1970) – Super 8 film, photo and text
- Inside the Harlequin: Approach-Avoidance III and II(1971) – Double Super 8 film installation
- Synchromatic Baseball (September 5, 1971) – performance action, 16 Rose Street, San Francisco
- 40 Winks (December 10, 1971) – performance action, University Art Museum, Berkeley
- Fuck You Purdue (1971) – videotape
- Sea Sell Sea Sick at Saw Sea Soar (1971) – videotape
- The Schizophrenia Projects (1970–71) – installation with text
- Drawings 1-9 (1971–74) - drawings
- Which Hunt? (1972) – videotape
- Indian War Dance / Indian Rope Trick (July 24–25, 1972) – performance action, documenta V, Kassel, Germany
- Fireman’s Conflict Resolution (1972, 1978, 1979) – installation
- Seaquick (1972) – performance, installation, videotape
- Long John Servil vs. Long John Silver (1972) – performance documentation
- Interaction performance/installation, April 20, 1973, All Night Sculptures, MOCA and Ghost of the Creamer (1974) – videotape
- Sustatense (1974) - videotape, KQED
- Derelict (1974) - installation
- The Burghers of Fort Worth (1975–76) – performance action, 16mm film transferred to video
- Clock of Commercial Significance 1976-80 – photo and text documentation of Synchromatic Baseball, 40 Winks and Portrait by Rumor (Chainsmoke).
- Vito's Reef (1978) – videotape
- The Museum Reaction Piece (1978–82) – video installation
- Condom (1979–80) – videotape
- Making a Paid Political Announcement (1981–82) – videotape
- Sociopath(1983) – installation
- The Edge of the Forest (1983) – installation
- Pattern Maker (1984) - installation
- Atomic +- Control (1985) - video installation
- Commercial Explosion #3 (1986) - installation
- Watershed D (1989) - installation

== Selected bibliography ==
- Richardson, Brenda. "Howard Fried: The Paradox of Approach-Avoidance," Arts Magazine, 45 (Summer 1971)
- Bear, Liza. "Howard Fried; The Cheshire Cat," Avalanche, no. 4 (Spring 1972)
- White, Robin. Interview with Howard Fried at Crown Point Press, ‘’View’’. Oakland, California: Crown Point Press, 1979.
- Roth, Moira. "A Star is Born: Performance Art in California," Performing Arts Journal, Vol. 4, No. 3. Cambridge: The MIT Press, 1980.
- Foley, Suzanne. Space Time Sound, Conceptual Art in the San Francisco Bay Area: The 1970s. San Francisco: San Francisco Museum of Modern Art, 1981. ISBN 0-295-95879-0
- Lewallen, Constance. Howard Fried: Works from 1969 to 1983. Berkeley: University Art Museum, University of California, Berkeley, 1983.
- Albright, Thomas. Art of the San Francisco Bay Area, 1945 - 1980. Berkeley: University of California Press, 1985. ISBN 0-520-05193-9, ISBN 978-0-520-05193-5
- University of Massachusetts Amherst, University Gallery. In site: five conceptual artists from the Bay Area: Terry Fox, Howard Fried, David Ireland, Paul Kos, Tom Marioni: University Gallery, Fine Arts Center, University of Massachusetts Amherst, February 2 March 17, 1990. Amherst: University Gallery, University of Massachusetts Amherst, 1990.
- Hall, Doug, Sally Jo Fifer, ed. Illuminating Video: An Essential Guide to Video Art. New York: Aperture Foundation/BAVC, 1991. ISBN 978-0-89381-390-1
- Schimmel, Paul, author. Out of Actions: Between Performance and the Object, 1949-1979. Museum of Contemporary Art, Los Angeles, 1998. ISBN 0500280509
- Verigne, Lea, ed. Body Art and Performance: The Body As Language. Skira Editore S. p. A., Milan, 2000. ISBN 978-88-8118-689-1
- Fried, Howard. "Structuring Inside the Harlequin; Watershed; Patternmaker," New Observations, (Fall/Winter 2000)
- Montano, Linda. Performance Artists Talking in the Eighties. Berkeley: University of California Press, 2000.ISBN 978-0520210226
- Phillips, Glenn, ed. California Video: Artists and Histories. Los Angeles: Getty Research Institute and J. Paul Getty Museum, 2008, ISBN 978-0-89236-922-5
- Bishop, Janet, Corey Keller, and Sarah Roberts, eds. San Francisco Museum of Modern Art: 75 Years of Looking Forward. San Francisco: SFMOMA. ISBN 978-0-918471-84-0
- Anker, Steve, Kathy Geritz, and Steve Seid, eds. Radical Light: Alternative Film & Video in the San Francisco Bay Area, 1945-2000 University of California Press: Berkeley and Los Angeles, 2010. ISBN 978-0-520-24911-0
- Hoffmann, Jens and Paul McCarthy, eds. Paul McCarthy's Low Life, Slow Life, Hatje Cantz, 2010. ISBN 3-7757-2573-3
- Schimmel, Paul and Lisa Gabrielle Mark, eds. Under the Big Black Sun: California Art 1974-1981, Prestel USA, 2011. ISBN 3-7913-5139-7
- Lewallen, Constance, Karen Moss, Julia Bryan-Wilson, and Anne Rorimer. State of Mind: New California Art Circa 1970, University of California Press, 2011. ISBN 0-520-27061-4
