= Jeff Ballard (artist) =

American glass artist

Jeff Ballard (born Chicago, 1977) is an American glass artist.

== Biography ==
Jeff Ballard started working with glass at the University of Illinois at Urbana–Champaign in the fall of 1996. After receiving his BFA in 2000 Ballard spent six years gaffing and designing work for production studios across the Southwest. He has taken classes and worked at Pilchuck Glass School, Haystack Mountain School of Crafts, and the Pittsburgh Glass Center, studying under notable artists such as Dante Marioni, Chris Taylor, Davide Salvadore, and Pino Signoretto. In 2006, Ballard re-located to the Northwest where he spends time creating his own work while teaching classes at the Eugene Glass School and the University of Oregon Craft Center. Ballard was announced as a finalist for the 2008 Niche Awards and was published in Art Buzz, the 2008 collection. He was newly awarded the Poleturner scholarship from Pilchuck and was also asked to be a craftsperson in residence for the creation of Pilchuck's 2008 and 2009 auction centerpieces. His work can be found in galleries, museums, and private collections throughout the United States.
