= Edwin T. Pratt =

American civil rights activist (1930–1969)

Edwin Thomas Pratt (December 6, 1930 – January 26, 1969) was an American activist during the Civil Rights Movement. At the time of his assassination in 1969, he was Executive Director of the Seattle Urban League.

== Life ==
Born in Miami, Florida, Pratt received his bachelor's degree from Clark College (Atlanta, Georgia) and his master's in social work from Atlanta University. He worked for the Urban League in Cleveland, Ohio, and Kansas City, Missouri, before arriving in Seattle in 1956 to be the Seattle league's Community Relations Secretary. In 1961, he became the Executive Director of the Seattle Urban League. Among his achievements was the Triad Plan for the desegregation of the Seattle Public Schools; he also led an initiative for equal housing opportunities.

Pratt was killed outside his home just north of Seattle in what is now Shoreline, Washington. Two men were involved in the shooting; it is presumed that a third drove the getaway car. It is still unknown who killed him.

Pratt was survived by his wife, Bettye, his son Bill, and his daughter Miriam Katherine, who was five years old at the time of his death.

He is commemorated today by Seattle's Pratt Park, the Pratt Fine Arts Center, and the Shoreline School District's Edwin Pratt Early Learning Center.

== See also ==
- List of unsolved murders (1900–1979)

== Archives ==
- The Seattle Urban League Records 1930-1997. 103.16 cubic feet. At the Labor Archives of Washington, University of Washington Libraries Special Collections.
