= Gurdon Woods =

American sculptor, academic administrator (1915–2007)

Gurdon Grant Woods

Director of California School of Fine Arts
- In office 1955–1964
- Preceded by: Ernest Karl Mundt
- Succeeded by: Theodore L. Eliot

Personal details
- Born: April 15, 1915 Savannah, Georgia, United States
- Died: July 31, 2007 (aged 92) Aptos, California, United States
- Education: Art Students League of New York
- Occupation: Sculptor, academic administrator, department chair, college director

Gurdon Grant Woods (1915–2007), was an American sculptor, and academic administrator. He served as the director of California School of Fine Arts (now San Francisco Art Institute); and he founded and chaired the art department at the University of California, Santa Cruz.

== Early life and education ==
Gurdon Grant Woods was born on April 15, 1915, in Savannah, Georgia. He served in the U.S. military during World War II, and attend the Art Students League of New York.

He exhibited his sculpture at the 3rd São Paulo Biennale in 1955.

== Career ==
Woods served as the director of California School of Fine Arts, from 1955 to 1964. In 1961, the name of the school was changed from California School of Fine Arts to San Francisco Art Institute (SFAI), in order to move away from any separation of applied arts and fine arts. During his time as director, he boosted the enrollment from 200 students to 690 students, he expanded the design curriculum, and added graduate programs in painting and sculpture. His role as SFAI director was succeeded by Theodore L. Eliot in 1964, who had joined the school as the director of finance in July 1963. From January 1964 to April 1965, Woods served as the director of only the college portion of school, and was succeeded by Fred Martin.

Shortly after leaving SFAI, Woods founded and chaired the art department at the University of California, Santa Cruz (UC Santa Cruz), from 1966 to 1974. While at UC Santa Cruz, Woods created an interdisciplinary arts education experience and invited guests such as avant-garde composer John Cage, and modern dancer Merce Cunningham. One of his students (and friends) from UC Santa Cruz was Jock Reynolds, former director of Yale Art Gallery.

This was followed in 1975 with Woods working as a director of the Otis Art Institute (now Otis College of Art and Design) in Los Angeles; and later he worked as the deputy director of programs for the Los Angeles Natural History Museum (now Natural History Museum of Los Angeles County). He retired in 1980, and focused his energy on making sculptures.

Woods died on July 31, 2007, at the age of 92 in his home in Aptos, California.
