= Liz Young =

American artist (1958–2020)

- Born: March 29, 1958; Minot, North Dakota, US
- Died: December 22, 2020 (aged 62); Los Angeles, California, US
- Education: Otis College of Art and Design
- Known for: Sculpture; installation art; drawing; painting
- Awards: John Simon Guggenheim Memorial Foundation, Andy Warhol Foundation, Getty Trust
- Website: lizyoungproduce.weebly.com

Liz Young, Of Blood and Dirt, installation view with full-sized felt-covered fiberglass horse and mixed-media drawings, 96” x 192” x 240”, 2017.

Liz Young (March 29, 1958 – December 22, 2020) was an American artist based in Los Angeles, California. Her work investigates body- and nature-focused themes, such as loss, beauty, the inevitability of decay, and the fragility of life. She has produced sculpture, installation, performance, painting, drawing and video incorporating fabricated and recontextualized found objects, organic materials, and processes from industrial metalworking to handicrafts, taxidermy and traditional art practices.

Young exhibited throughout the United States and Europe, including solo shows at the Los Angeles County Museum of Art (LACMA) and Los Angeles Contemporary Exhibitions (LACE), and alternative spaces such as Hallwalls, Randolph Street Gallery (Chicago) and New Langton Arts (San Francisco); she participated in group shows at Exit Art, Art in the Anchorage, and Armory Center for the Arts, among others. Her art has been discussed in ARTnews, Artforum, Frieze, Los Angeles Times, The New York Times, and The Village Voice, and is included in the LACMA permanent collection. Critic Peter Frank wrote that her work "reflects both on life's relentless erosion of body and spirit, and on our indomitable struggle against these nagging cruelties."

Artillery Magazine critic Ezrha Jean Black called her 2017 installation a "mordant yet elegiac show" in which "craft bears out the work’s consciousness." In 2016, Young received a Guggenheim Foundation Fellowship; she was recognized with awards from the Getty Trust and Andy Warhol Foundation, among others. Young lived and worked in Los Angeles from 1981.

== Life and career ==
Young was born in Minot, North Dakota in 1958. She spent her childhood moving throughout the American West and Europe due to her father's work. Drawn to handicrafts, she learned carpentry from her father, knitting, weaving and crocheting from her grandmother, and mechanics in her youth. One month after beginning college in 1976, Young was involved in a catastrophic car accident that left her permanently paralyzed from the waist down. After a long rehabilitation, she attended the University of New Mexico, where her art pairing feminist ideas, diverse materials and processes such as craft was encouraged by artist Harmony Hammond. In 1981, she relocated to Los Angeles to attend Otis College of Art and Design (BFA, 1984), where she was influenced by performance and body artists, such as Vito Acconci, Chris Burden, Gina Pane, Hermann Nitsch and Rudolf Schwarzkogler.

After graduating, Young built her knowledge of fabrication through jobs creating molds for artists, welds for the Rose Parade, and specialty props for movies. For her own art, she scavenged alleys, loading docks and junkyards in Los Angeles's downtown industrial area, reclaiming abandoned materials that she reworked into sculptural objects. In 1985, she began exhibiting professionally at alternative spaces such as LACE, and later, New Langton Arts, Center on Contemporary Art (Seattle), and the Santa Monica Museum of Art. In 1993, she became the first artist recognized by the Los Angeles County Museum of Art's "Here and Now" Young Talent program to receive a sponsored full exhibition there (titled The Dignity of Survival). More recently, Young exhibited at PØST, Armory Center for the Arts, the Luckman Center, and Deep River in Los Angeles, Long Beach Museum of Art, and numerous universities and colleges, among other venues. She taught sculpture, art history and digital arts at Los Angeles County High School for the Arts since 2004 and became Visual Arts Department co-chair in 2016.

Liz Young, The Birth/Death Chair with Rawhide Shoes, Bones and Organs, chair, rawhide shoes, and cast iron, bronze and lead, 48" x 84" x 36", 1993. Los Angeles County Museum of Art collection.

== Work ==
Young was sometimes labelled a conceptual artist, due to a generative approach that clusters diverse objects, materials, mediums, and ideas to achieve its expression. She differed from such artists, however, in her commitment to workmanship, materiality, and leaving evidence of ritualistic, labor-intensive processes such as industrial fabrication and needlecraft. Her work combined fabricated elements (ranging from welded cages and hand-crafted nails to clothing and taxidermy animals), organic materials, and familiar objects evoking memory, which she refashioned and recontextualized. She explored themes involving the body and its limits, the human condition, loss, and the inevitability of nature; writers described her art, variously, as challenging and visceral, unsettling, black-humored, and autobiographical, emotional and haunting.

=== Body-related sculpture, installations and paintings (1985–2004) ===
Young's early work (e.g., Psychic Bleeding, 1986; The Allowance of Pain, 1990–2), featured crudely-wrought assemblage "machines," arranged in theater-like installations and used in performances (which she termed "live procedures") that investigate bodily issues of endurance, struggle, constraint, and the transcendence of pain and limitation. The apparatuses drew on a vocabulary of forms derived from positions of the human body (seated, standing, etc.) and recalled hospital gurneys, operating tables, dunking and electric chairs, confessionals or coffin/cradles. The contrary processes and materials of their fabrication, however, often precluded practical function, rendering them, in one description, "ominous and unknowable." Critics such as Roberta Smith of New York Times and Suzanne Muchnic of the Los Angeles Times identified them as homespun and antiquated-looking implements of torture, humiliation or extreme toil that comprised a "horrific prison" of heavy metal contraptions conjuring institutional and political confinement. Vacillating between public and private spheres, the installations physically positioned viewers as complicit voyeurs, potential victims, or perpetrators within spaces and situations implying danger, imprisonment, or ritual.

Liz Young, Cross Bed, latex, fabric, wood, 30" x 60" x 60", 1997.

Like earlier works, The Dignity of Survival (1992–3) served as both an explorable environment and site for Young's physically demanding "live procedures." The work's charged objects, displayed in suspended cage-like structures that viewers could enter, included a medical-like device; a vest-like, pregnant-man "coat of shame" with an umbilical cord leading to a rock; a shaving/shearing stand; and The Birth/Death Chair, a fabricated birthing chair connected to a ball-and-chain-like trail of cast-iron bones and human viscera.

Young's subsequent installations extended outward to larger family and social bodies. Mendacity (1996) featured miniature scaled institutional structures (city hall, church, bank, school, hospital, home) clustered like a city block and surrounded by hanging thrift store clothing. Frieze critic Michelle Grabner wrote that its tactile, construction-grade materials and household objects created an "uncanny physical life" capturing the tension between the seductions of institutions and their function of control. For Skin Inn (1997), Young constructed an oddly furnished (the cruciform Cross Bed, a grafted junk chair-and-love seat, and seesawing dining chairs) mobile home, which housed a silent, opening-night performance by a "family" of three as viewers peered in through doors and windows. Writers interpreted the installation and mysterious, ritual-like performance—which included cutting Young out of a cocoon-like dress—as a satirical subversion of everyday rituals expressing the horror of confinement and repetition.

Young's body-related art also included paintings and fabricated objects, such as clothing made to look like flesh, mannequin-like figures and prosthetics. In 1997, she exhibited thirteen, small, commonplace portraits of her deceased relatives, painted with her own blood; critics described them as haunting, morbid, and intimate, noting the delicate handling of the pigment, which featured transparent glazes and areas of thick application that cracked like Old Master surfaces.

=== Nature-related installations, sculpture, drawings (1998–2020) ===
During a 1998 residency at the Ucross Foundation—a working ranch—Young began incorporating images of nature, displacing some of her characteristic themes, such as the fragility and pathos of human experience onto animals and plants. In a 2001 Skirball Cultural Center show of COLA Fellowship winners, her installation combined life-size models of farm animals covered with flesh-like material rather than fur, and a business suit and nurse's uniform fabricated from skin-like industrial bags; Los Angeles Times critic Holly Myers described them as "simultaneously vague and uncomfortably visceral." Going forward, her work would also draw on the themes, landscape and literature of the American West, images of Americana, and processes such as taxidermy, embroidery and other handicrafts.

Liz Young, Still Life, installation view with graphite drawings on wood paneling and taxidermy, 120” x 96” x 96”, 2013.

Young's embroidered drawings of the late 2000s were described as balancing finely wrought craft technique and rigorous conceptual underpinnings. Working with and into freighted, found objects of Americana (flags, deer targets, stuffed animals), she offered both humor—a coat sewn from stuffed animal pelts, including ear flaps and plastic eyes or locusts and rats stitched onto old farming magazine covers—and social critique, as in Balmy Birds (2006), an upside-down American flag whose embroidered black birds conveyed a sense of political anxiety and chaos. Her 2013 show, "Still Life," incorporated taxidermy animals (a bird and deer) and graphite drawings on wood paneling of the same animals; together they functioned as contemporary memento mori or nature morte depicting images of nature as lifeless, still, and dislocated.

Young's later installations, Freed of The Tie Between Root and Soil (Fellows of Contemporary Art, 2017) and "Of Blood and Dirt" (PØST, 2017), explore the cycle of life and mortality through motifs of landscape and nature, the body, blood, and earth. Both shows employ two- and three-dimensional, positive and negative images in sculpture and drawings that often focus on the absence of the body or nature; these images include a cut-out window silhouette of a dead or dormant tree out of which graphic, red, sculptural roots/arteries emanate (Blood in the Roots, 2017), and isolated, silhouette-like drawings of bare trees, text, dead birds and deer emerging out of dark fields of gunpowder, graphite, and ballpoint pen.

== Recognition ==
Young received a Guggenheim Foundation Fellowship in 2016, and was recognized with awards from the City of Los Angeles (2001), California Arts Council (2001, 1992), the Andy Warhol Foundation (1997, 1991), Art Matters (1995), and the Getty Trust (1993), among others. She held artist residencies from PLAYA (2018), Santa Fe Art Institute/Creative Access Residency Initiative (2015), the Surdna Foundation (2009), McColl Center for Art + Innovation (2000), Ucross Foundation (1998), Headlands Center for the Arts (1998), and the MacDowell Arts Colony Fellowship (1991). Young's work is included in the art collections of the Los Angeles County Museum of Art, Lef Foundation, William and Mary Greve Foundation and Norton Family Foundation.
