= Susan Plum =

American glass and installation artist

- Born: 1944 (age 81–82); Houston, Texas
- Occupation: Artist

Susan Plum (born 1944 in Houston, Texas) is an American multidisciplinary artist. Plum's oeuvre encompasses various media, including drawing, painting, photography, and performance. Her work often explores themes of cosmology, quantum physics, indigenous beliefs, and humanitarian concerns, reflecting her belief in art as a vehicle for healing, transformation, and social activism.

== Early life and education ==
Raised in Mexico City, she was deeply influenced by the region's Magical Realism and Surrealism movements. Plum pursued her education at the University of Arizona, the University of the Americas in Mexico City, and the Pilchuck Glass School in Stanwood, Washington. Plum has been influenced by surrealist painters like Remedios Varo and Leonora Carrington.

== Artistic career ==
Initially trained as a painter, Plum transitioned to glass art after travels in India, Nepal, and Thailand, where she was inspired by the material's luminous qualities. She studied flameworking under artist Ginny Ruffner at the Pilchuck Glass School., mastering techniques that allow her to "draw" three-dimensional forms with glass.

== Selected installations ==
"Woven Heaven, Tangled Earth": Located in the Corning Museum of Glass, the work is a large three-foot-diameter sphere woven from millimeter-thin borosilicate rods inspired by Mayan cosmology, symbolizing the loom of the universe and the shamanic process of untangling discord. This intricate weaving creates a lattice-like, transparent structure that reflects and refracts light.

"Sacred Garden": The installation, in the Security Pacific Gallery in Seattle, features a garden-like arrangement with glass, natural elements, and symbolic objects. The centerpiece is a metal structure supporting borosilicate rods of varying lengths (ranging from 18 to 36 inches). Visitors can walk along the edges of the installation. A central pyramid of oranges symbolizes fertility, abundance, and spiritual offering.

"Falling Bodies, Taking Flight": Combined natural materials including large hazel branches with borosilicate glass and suspended oranges, evoking cosmic and celestial themes. The piece blends the natural and sculptural elements to create a multi-sensory experience.

"Luz y Solidaridad (Light and Solidarity)": A social activism piece addressing the disappearance and murder of young women near the U.S.-Mexico border around Juarez, incorporating ritual performances and symbolic brooms as tools of cleansing to comment on the erasure of the past and connectivity to the present.

"Heart of Heaven" and "Heart of Earth": Shown together, these installations explore cosmic and natural morphogenesis, exhibited internationally in a show called Towards a Balanced Earth, held at the National Museum of Wellington, New Zealand. "Heart of Heaven" is inspired by the Milky Way including a Mayan glyph representing the galactic center serving as a focal point with glass rods extending outward, creating a three-dimensional starburst effect that evokes celestial radiance. The complimentary "Heart of Earth" features an intricate transition from an insect wing to a leaf pattern, symbolizing transformation and interconnectedness between life forms or morphogenesis.

"Intersection": created in a row house as part of Houston’s Project Row Houses, an initiative supporting art and social engagement. The installation focuses on the Double-Helix Nebula, weaving light and cosmic themes into physical forms through the use of a found Ficus tree repurposed and woven with materials echoing Plum's recurring metaphor of the universe as a loom.

== Museum collections ==
Her work is included in the collections of the Seattle Art Museum, the Museum of Glass in Tacoma, Corning Museum of Glass, the US Department of State, and the Smithsonian American Art Museum.
