= Anne Gould Hauberg Artist Images Award =

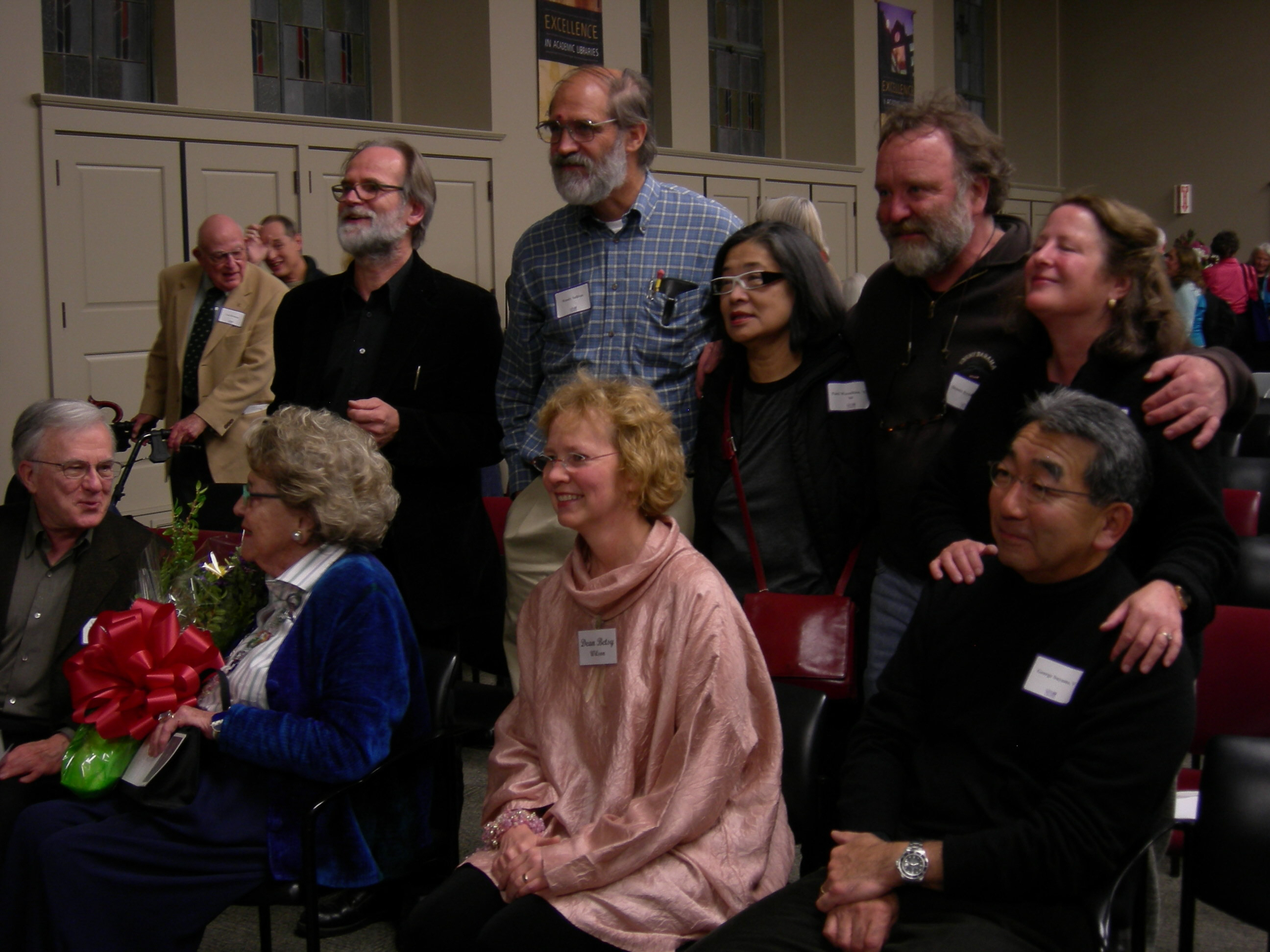
At presentation of 2007 Award. Front row (left to right): Jerry Anderson, Nordic Studies Librarian, founder of the award; Anne Gould Hauberg; Betsy Wilson, Dean of University of Washington Libraries; George Suyama, architect, winner of 2004 award. Second row (left to right): Trimpin, sculptor / musician, winner of 2007 award; Woodruff Sullivan, astronomer (and designer of sundials), winner of 1995 award; Patti Warashina, sculptor, winner of 2005 award; Dennis Evans, multi-media artist and Nancy Mee, glass artist, co-winners of 2002 award.

The Anne Gould Hauberg Artist Images Award (prior to 2007 simply the Artist Images Award), first held in 1990, is a biennial (was annual until 2009) award given by the University of Washington Libraries in partnership with the UW Alumni Association. A public lecture is given by the artist and a bookmark is designed in honor of the recipient.

Past winners of the award are:

| Year | Winner | Nature of work |
|---|---|---|
| 1990 | Norman Lundin | Painter |
| 1991 | David Horsey | Editorial cartoonist |
| 1992 | William O. Smith | Clarinetist |
| 1993 | Peter Harrison | Bird artist and author |
| 1994 | Doris Chase | Video Artist |
| 1995 | Woodruff Sullivan | Astronomer |
| 1996 | Jacob Lawrence | Painter |
| 1997 | Alfredo Arreguín | Muralist |
| 1998 | Cappy Thompson | Glass painter |
| 1999 | Mary Randlett | Photographer |
| 2000 | Bill Holm | North Coast artist |
| 2001 | Philip McCracken | Sculptor |
| 2002 | Dennis Evans | Multi-media artist |
| 2002 | Nancy Mee | Glass artist |
| 2003 | Ginny Ruffner | Glass artist and painter |
| 2004 | George Suyama | Architect |
| 2005 | Patti Warashina | Sculptor |
| 2006 | Dale Chihuly | Glass artist and painter |
| 2007 | Trimpin | Sculptor, musician, multi-media artist |
| 2008 | Norie Sato | Multi-media installation artist |
| 2009 | Mary Lee Hu | Metal artist |
| 2011 | Thomas T. Wilson | Painter |
| 2013 | Fay Jones | Painter and printmaker |
