= Big Time (1988 film) =

1988 film

- promotional poster
- Directed by: Chris Blum
- Written by: Kathleen Brennan; Tom Waits
- Produced by: Chris Blackwell (executive producer); Catherine Peacock (associate producer); Luc Roeg (producer)
- Starring: Tom Waits
- Cinematography: Daniel Hainey
- Edited by: Glen Scantlebury
- Distributed by: Island Visual Arts (1988) (USA) (theatrical)
- Release dates: September 15, 1988 (Toronto Film Festival); June 30, 1988 (U.S.)
- Running time: 90 minutes (V); 87 minutes (NYT/MFB)
- Country: United States
- Language: English
- Box office: $148,426 (USA)

Big Time is a 1988 American musical film directed by Chris Blum.

== Summary ==
A concert film centering on singer Tom Waits featuring songs from the albums Swordfishtrombones, Rain Dogs and Franks Wild Years.

== Production ==
Filming took place in Los Angeles and San Francisco, California.

There were no known existing 35mm prints of this concert film until an archival one appeared in the late 2010s.

== Cast ==
- Tom Waits - Himself
- Michael L. Blair - Musician
- Ralph Carney - Musician
- Greg Cohen - Musician
- Marc Ribot - Musician
- Willie Schwarz - Musician

== Songs ==
- "Frank's Wild Years"
- "Shore Leave"
- "Way Down in the Hole"
- "Hang On St. Christopher"
- "Telephone Call From Istanbul"
- "Cold, Cold Ground"
- "Straight to the Top (Vegas)"
- "Strange Weather"
- "Gun Street Girl"
- "9th and Hennepin"
- "Clap Hands"
- "Time"
- "Rain Dogs"
- "Train Song"
- "Sixteen Shells From a Thirty-Ought Six"
- "I'll Take New York"
- "More Than Rain"
- "Johnsburg, Illinois"
- "Innocent When You Dream (Barroom)"
- "Big Black Mariah"

== Critical response ==
Jon Pareles wrote a negative review in The New York Times, saying even fans of Waits would find it "frustrating and off-putting" and that it "turns Mr. Waits's performance into a freak show." Richard Harrington wrote a negative review in The Washington Post, describing the film as "More an indulgence than a concert" and the songs as "often intriguing" but "only rarely [...] listenable". Jeffrey M. Anderson, in a mixed review for Combustible Celluloid, described the film as "a treat" for fans of Tom Waits and "one hell of a show." Time Out magazine called it a "magnificent movie" and "A concert film unlike any other". TV Guide gave the film 3 out of 5 stars, calling it "more performance than music" and a "work that demands to be taken on its own terms."

== Formats ==
Big Time was issued on LaserDisc, VHS in Japan, UK and Yugoslavia, but was only issued on VHS in North America. No official DVD or Blu-ray edition has yet been released, though the film was made available for streaming on the Amazon Prime platform on September 1, 2020.

== See also ==
- Home of the Brave - Laurie Anderson 1986 concert film
- Stop Making Sense
- Jim Jarmusch
