= Ann Gardner =

American glass artist

Ann Gardener
- Born: 1947 (age 78–79); Eugene, Oregon
- Education: University of Oregon; Portland State University
- Occupation: Artist
- Known for: Glass Artist
- Website: www.anngardner.net

Ann Gardner (born 1947) is an American glass artist known for her large-scale sculptural and architectural installations.

== Early life ==
She was born in Eugene, Oregon.

== Education and career ==
Gardner began her career studying at the University of Oregon. In 1974, she received a degree in Ceramics and Fine Arts from Portland State University. As a developing artist, she incorporated painting, ceramics, and drawing into her work. Gardener moved to Seattle in 1979 where she continues to work.

Gardner's early training and work used hand-painted ceramics. In 1985, Dale Chihuly invited her to be an artist-in-residence at the Pilchuck Glass School where she adapted her ceramics experience to working with glass. During her second residency at Pilchuck, Gardener developed techniques that lead her towards the use of largely monochromatic glass tiles (tessera) and mosaics. She is best known for using these techniques to create large-scale architectural installations and sculpture, such as Convergence, Lebeg, and Earth, Fields, Forest, Night, Sun and Water.

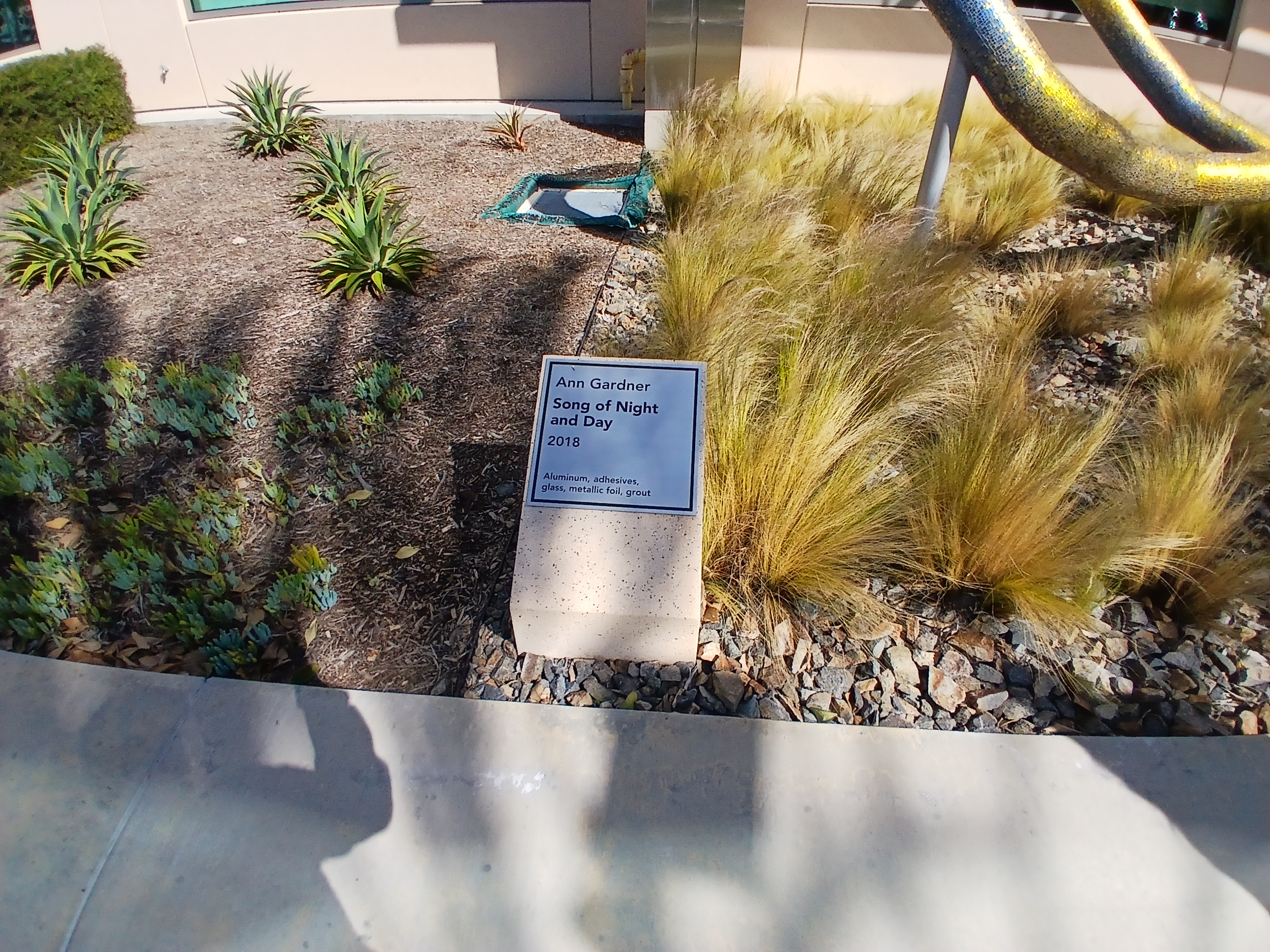
A sculpture plaque, located at the San Diego County Sheriff's Department Regional Crime Laboratory.

Gardner has her work featured in the collections of the Corning Museum of Glass, the Seattle Art Museum, the Tacoma Art Museum, the American Museum of Crafts in New York City, among other places.

== Awards ==
Gardner has worked as Artist in Residence at the Pilchuck Glass School and Museum of Glass, and received multiple National Endowment for the Arts fellowships. In 1993 she was awarded the Louis Comfort Tiffany Award. Her work Ring of Water was recognized in 2004 as one of the best public art projects by Americans for the Arts. Fog received the Juror's Choice Award in New Glass Review. In 2011, Gardener became the first mosaic artist to receive the Rakow Commission for her work Five Pods.
