= Benjamin Moore (artist) =

American glass artist (1952–2021)

Benjamin Powell Moore
- Born: February 5, 1952; Olympia, Washington, U.S.
- Died: June 25, 2021 (aged 69); Seattle, Washington, U.S.
- Education: California College of Arts and Crafts (BFA), Rhode Island School of Design (MFA)
- Occupations: Glass artist, teacher
- Spouse: Debora Moore
- Children: 1

Benjamin Powell Moore (February 5, 1952 – June 25, 2021) was an American studio glass artist and teacher. He was one of the most influential 20th century glassblowers in the United States. He established the production studio Benjamin Moore, Inc. in Seattle; and served for many years as the director of the Pilchuck Glass School.

In 2009, Moore was awarded the title of fellow from the American Craft Council (ACC).

== Early life and education ==
Benjamin "Benny" Powell Moore was born on February 5, 1952, in Olympia, Washington.

Moore received a BFA degree in 1974 in ceramics from the California College of Arts and Crafts (now the California College of the Arts) in the San Francisco Bay Area, where he studied under Marvin Lipofsky; and a MFA degree in 1977 from Rhode Island School of Design (RISD) in Providence.

He was married to glass artist Debora Moore, and together they had a daughter.

== Career ==
From 1974 until 1987, Moore served as the educational coordinator at Pilchuck Glass School in Stanwood, Washington. At Pilchunk Glass School, Moore worked alongside Dale Chihuly.

His glass work was part of the traveling exhibition, Young Americans: Clay/Glass (1978) and Craft Today: Poetry of the Physical (1987) which was shown at fourteen museums across Europe.

He was awarded the title of fellow in 2009 from the American Craft Council (ACC) in New York.

== Death and legacy ==
Moore died on June 25, 2021, in Seattle, Washington.

His work is in museum collections including at the Smithsonian American Art Museum in Washington, D.C.; the Museum of Arts and Design in New York City; the National Museum in Stockholm; the Glasmuseet Ebeltoft in Ebeltoft, Denmark; and the Corning Museum of Glass in Corning, New York.
