= Anne Gould Hauberg =

American philanthropist (1917–2016)

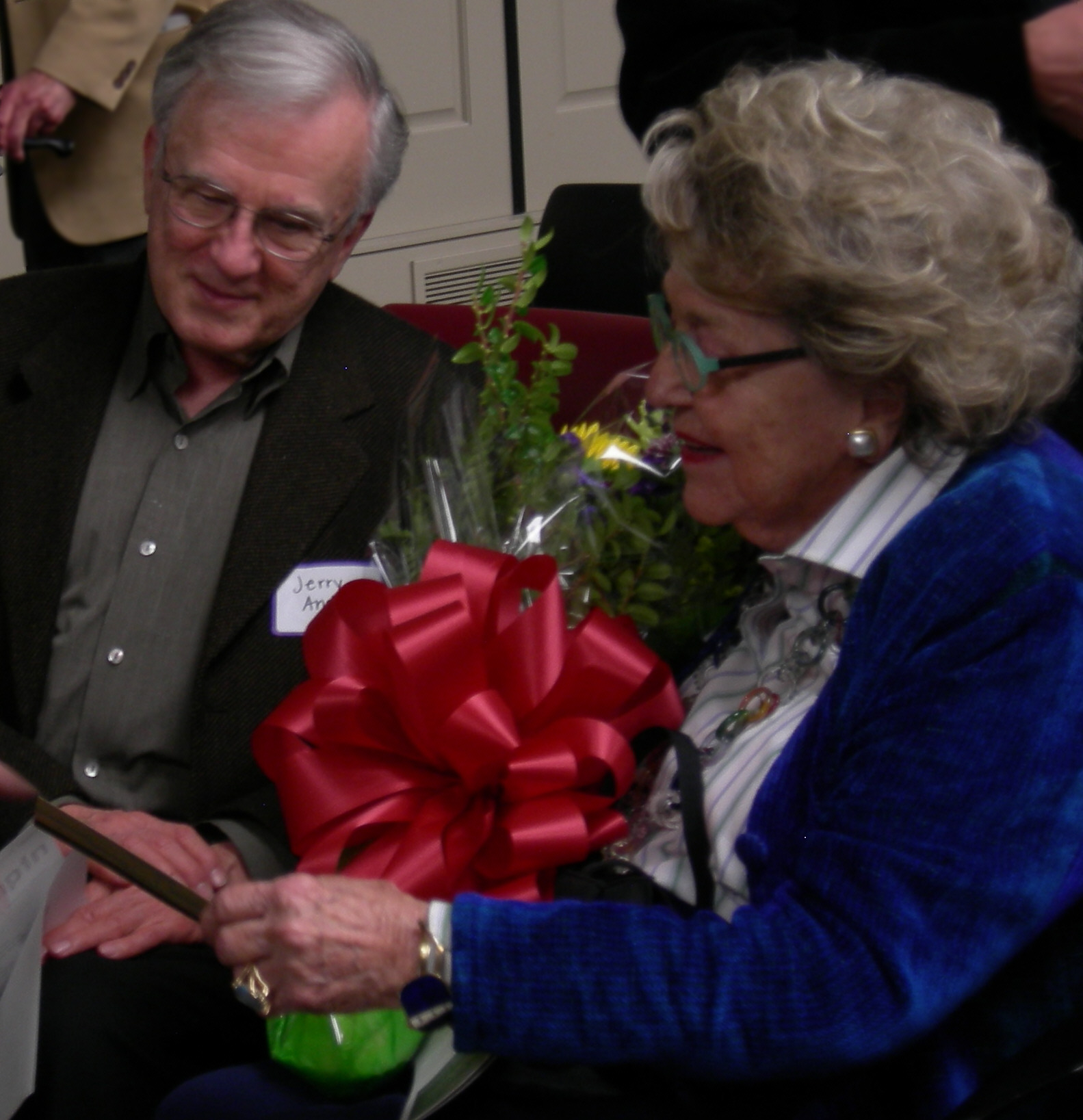
Hauberg (right) with Jerry Anderson, Nordic Studies Librarian, founder of the University of Washington Libraries' Artist Images Award, at the presentation of the 2007 award. She is holding a copy of the bookmark honoring Trimpin, winner of that year's award.

Anne Gould Hauberg (November 13, 1917 – April 11, 2016) was an American civic activist, philanthropist, and patroness of the arts.

Annie Laurie Westbrook Gould (she later changed this to Anne Westbrook Gould) was the daughter of Seattle architect and educator Carl F. Gould and Dorothy Fay Gould. Anne Gould was raised in Seattle and studied architecture at the University of Washington College of Architecture and Urban Planning for two years (she was particularly influenced by faculty member Lionel Pries), then spent a year at Vassar, before enrolling at the Cambridge School of Architecture and Design in Cambridge, Massachusetts, but she returned to Seattle on the death of her father in 1939.

In June 1941, Anne Gould married John Hauberg, a timber heir, who attended Princeton University and graduated from the University of Washington College of Forestry in 1949.

Anne Hauberg's philanthropic career was launched when two of the couple's three children proved to be mentally disabled. The Haubergs gave funds for the creation of the Pilot School for Neurologically Impaired Children which opened in 1960 in two small buildings on the University of Washington campus. The School continues today as the EEU (Experimental Education Unit), a portion of the University of Washington Center on Human Development and Disability.

In the 1950s, the Haubergs emerged as patrons of the arts in Seattle and the Pacific Northwest. They not only collected art works, but provided support for emerging Northwest artists. By the 1960s, Anne Hauberg particularly focused on supporting the crafts through another philanthropic organization, the Friends of the Crafts.

By the 1960s, Anne Hauberg was involved in the Seattle Municipal Art Commission, and she was a founding member of the civic activist organization, the "Committee of 33."

In 1969, Anne and John Hauberg together supported Dale Chihuly's idea for a glass-blowing summer school program in the rural Northwest. The subsequent development of this program became the Pilchuck Glass School.

Anne Gould Hauberg and John Hauberg divorced in 1978–79.

Anne Hauberg continued her activities in the arts and was deeply involved in the Seattle Art Museum, the Tacoma Art Museum, the Pilchuck School and other Northwest arts organizations. In addition, she was an honorary member of Northwest Designer Craftsmen.

In 2007, the University of Washington Libraries' Artist Images Award was renamed the Anne Gould Hauberg Artist Images Award in her honor.
