= John Marioni =

- Education: University of Cambridge
- Scientific career
- Fields: Computational biology Human Genetics single-cell biology
- Workplaces: University of Chicago; University of Cambridge
- Thesis: Statistical methods for arrayCGH and copy number variation experiments (2007)
- Doctoral advisor: Simon Tavaré

John Marioni is a Senior Vice President and Head of Computation at Genentech Research and Early Development (gRED) in South San Francisco. Previously he was the Head of Research at the European Bioinformatics Institute and held an appointment at the Wellcome Sanger Institute and the Cancer Research UK Cambridge Institute in Cambridge University. He is a computational biologist known for his research on statistical and computational methods for the analysis of genomics data, in particular single-cell biology and evolutionary genomics. He continues to co-chair the Human Cell Atlas Analysis Working Group.

== Research and career ==
Marioni has conducted influential studies in whole-tissue and single-cell transcriptomics. He received his PhD from the University of Cambridge in Applied Mathematics in 2008. He conducted postdoctoral studies in the University of Chicago under Matthew Stephens.

Marioni is known for "pioneering the statistical analysis of gene expression patterns in individual cells, which has led to a radical paradigm shift in the field of transcriptomics."

=== Awards and honours ===
- Blavatnik Awards Young Scientists 2021 United Kingdom Award Finalist
- Elected Fellow of St Edmund's College, Cambridge (2016)
- John Wishart Prize for Statistics, awarded by Statistical Laboratory of University of Cambridge (2004)
- Elected Fellow of the Academy of Medical Sciences

== Select publications ==
- R Argelaguet, SJ Clark, H Mohammed, et al., JC Marioni, W Reik. Multi-omics Profiling of Mouse Gastrulation at Single-cell Resolution. Nature. doi:10.1038/s41586-019-1825-8
- L Haghverdi, ATL Lun, MD Morgan, JC Marioni. Batch Effects in Single-cell RNA-sequencing Data are Corrected by Matching Mutual Nearest Neighbors. Nature Biotechnology. doi:10.1038/nbt.4091
- B Pijuan-Sala, JA Griffiths, C Guibentif, et al., JC Marioni, B Göttgens. A Single-cell Molecular Map of Mouse Gastrulation and Early Organogenesis. Nature. doi:10.1038/s41586-019-0933-9
- T Lohoff, S Ghazanfar, A Missarova, N Koulena, N Pierson, JA Griffiths, ES Bardot, CL Eng, RCV Tyser, R Argelaguet, C Guibentif, S Srinivas, J Briscoe, BD Simons, AK Hadjantonakis, B Göttgens, W Reik, J Nichols, L Cai, JC Marioni. Integration of spatial and single-cell transcriptomic data elucidates mouse organogenesis. Nature Biotechnology. doi:10.1038/s41587-021-01006-2
- R Argelaguet, ASE Cuomo, O Stegle, JC Marioni. Computational principles and challenges in single-cell data integration. Nature Biotechnology. doi:10.1038/s41587-021-00895-7.
