= Sonja Blomdahl =

American glass artist

- Born: 1952 (age 73–74); Waltham, Massachusetts
- Education: BFA, Massachusetts College of Art (Boston)
- Known for: Glass vessels using incalmo technique

Sonja Blomdahl (born 1952) is an American glass artist known for her use of the Venetian glass incalmo technique to create blown glass vessels. Her work brings together multiple elements into symmetrical forms, often using contrasting colors and both opaque and transparent glass. Based in Seattle, Washington, she established her studio in 1983 and has been associated with the studio glass movement.

== Early life and education ==
Sonja Blomdahl was born in 1952 in Waltham, Massachusetts. She began glassmaking as an undergraduate student during the 1970s. She earned a Bachelor of Fine Arts in ceramics from Massachusetts College of Art (Boston) in 1974. There she studied with glass sculptor Dan Dailey. In 1976, she spent six months studying at the Orrefors glassworks in Sweden. Her work has been associated with Scandinavian design, and she later learned the incalmo (double-bubble) technique from Venetian glassmaker Checco Ongaro.

== Career ==
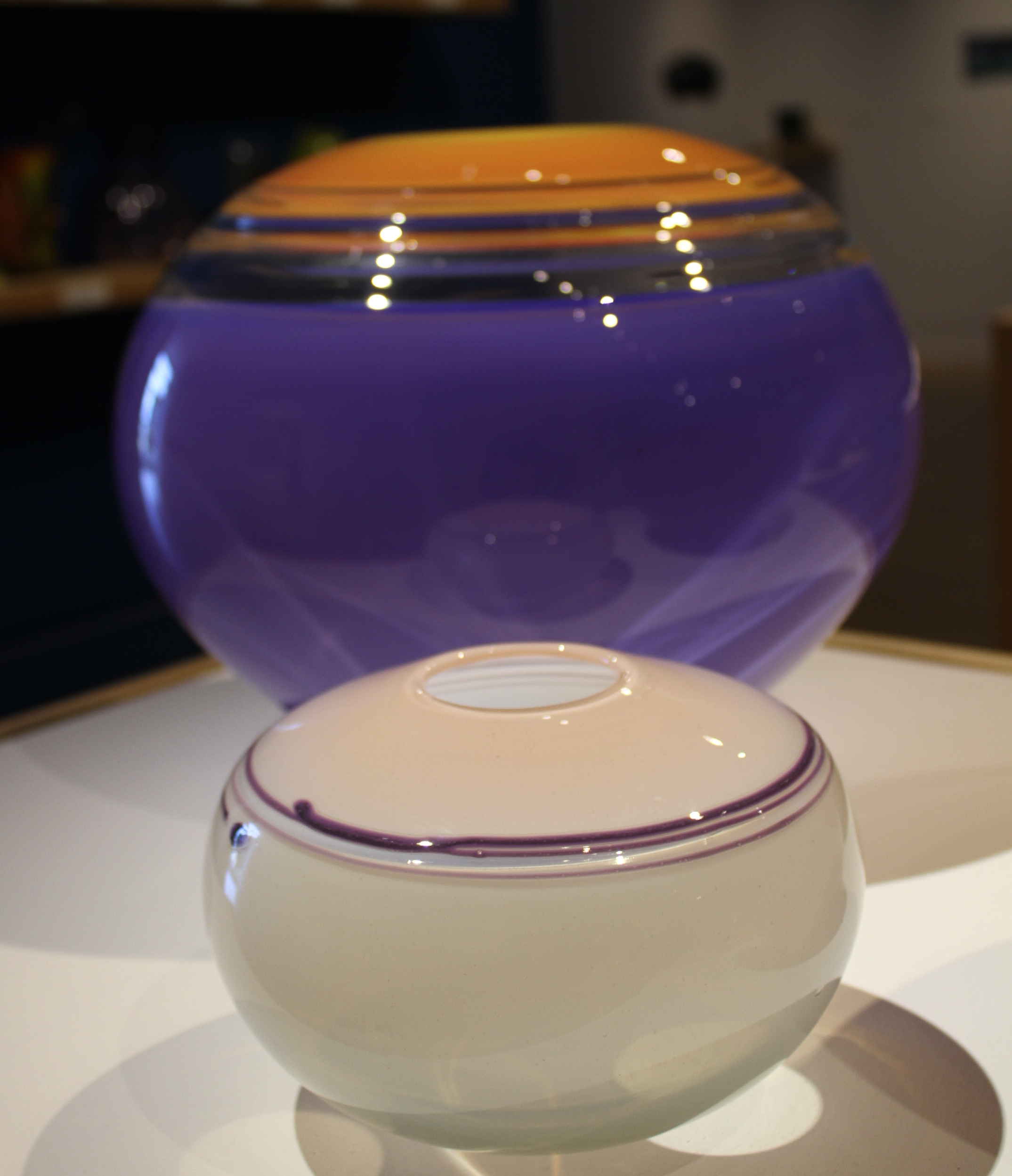
Blomdahl vase, Tacoma Art Museum

Blomdahl served as a teaching assistant to Dan Dailey at Pilchuck Glass School in 1978, where she first observed the incalmo technique. She has also taught at Pratt Fine Arts Center in Seattle, Haystack Mountain School of Crafts in Maine, and the Appalachian Center in Tennessee. She established her own studio in Seattle in 1983, which remained in operation until 2009. Since the late 2000s, her work has expanded beyond symmetrical vessels to include architectural forms.

== Artistic style ==
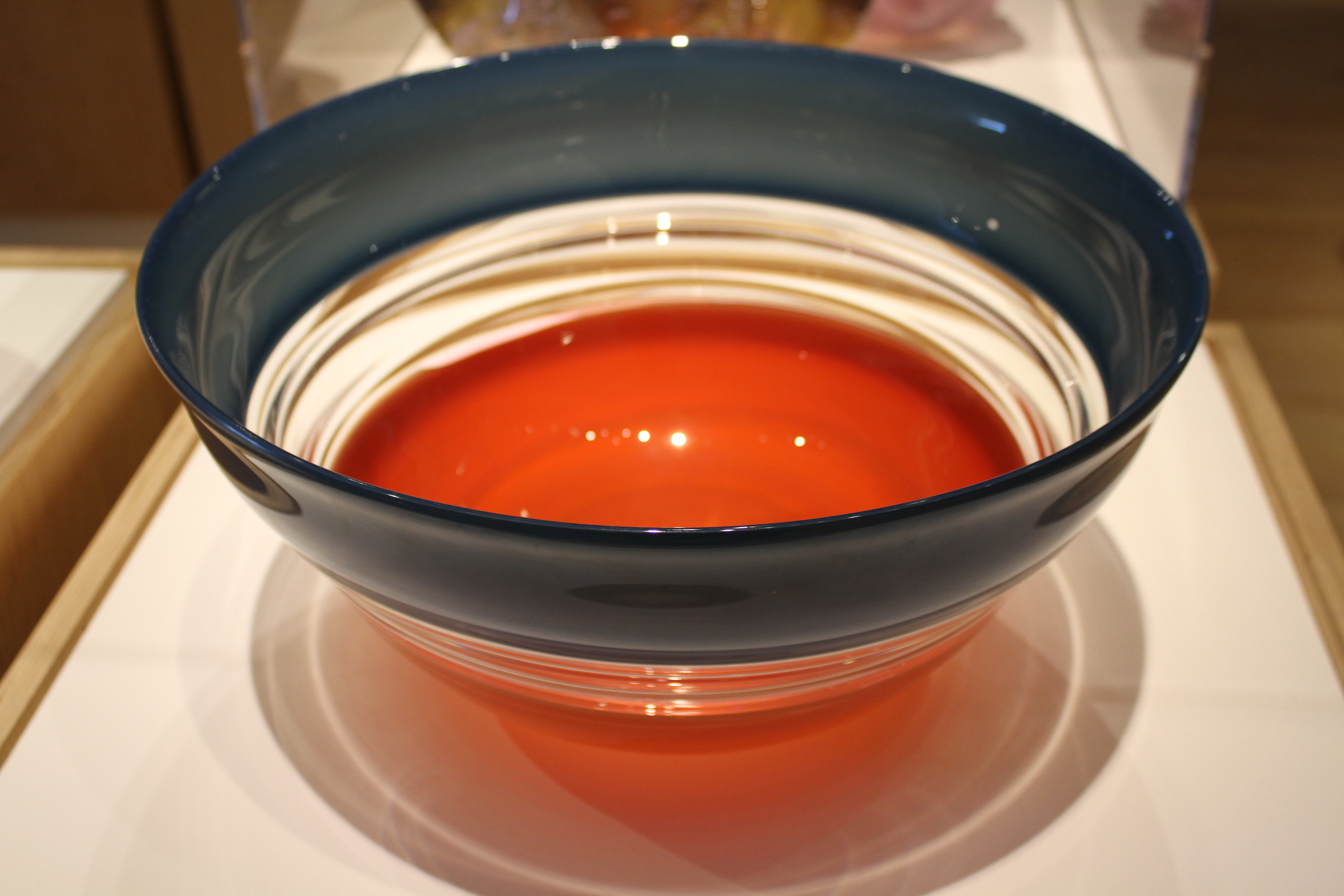
Blomdahl bowl, Tacoma Art Museum

Blomdahl uses the Venetian incalmo technique, in which separately blown glass elements are joined while hot to form a single vessel. Her work typically combines bands of contrasting colors and integrates both opaque and transparent glass to explore color relationships and the effects of light.

== Public collections ==
Selected public collections holding works by Sonja Blomdahl

- Corning Museum of Glass, Corning, New York
- Museum of Decorative Arts, Prague
- Museum of Fine Arts, Boston, Massachusetts
- Racine Art Museum, Racine, Wisconsin
- Renwick Gallery, Smithsonian American Art Museum, Washington, DC

== Awards and honors ==
- 1986: NEA Visual Arts Fellowship Grant
- 1987: Artists' Trust Fellowship Grant, Washington State
- 2001: U.S. Department of State gift to the Prime Minister of Sweden

== See also ==
- Dale Chihuly
- Studio glass
