= Alan Scarritt =

American video artist (1945–2023)

Alan Bell Scarritt
- Alan Scarritt in 2011
- Born: November 14, 1945; Oak Park, Illinois
- Died: July 1, 2023 (aged 77); Albany, New York
- Known for: video installation, sculpture, works on paper, sound art
- Movement: Conceptual art
- Parents: Ralph Scarritt Jr. (father); Natalie Bell Scarritt (mother)
- Awards: Pollock-Krasner Foundation Grant; California Arts Council Grant; New York State Council on the Arts Grant; National Endowment for the Arts Fellowship
- Website: alanbscarritt.com

Alan Scarritt (1945–2023) was an artist active in California in the late 20th century. He is best known for his conceptual art projects, mixed-media works on paper, video installation, and sound art.

== Early life and education ==
Scarritt was born in Oak Park, Illinois to Ralph Scarritt Jr. and Natalie Bell Scarritt. He attended Brown University where he received a bachelor's degree in 1967, and went on to attend the California College of the Arts, where he received an MFA degree in 1972. He later took post-graduate courses at the Rhode Island School of Design.

== Work ==
Scaritt co-founded a studio called Site (later known as Site, Cite, Sight, Inc.) in San Francisco, along with artists Marilyn Bogerd and Mike Roddy. Site was "a non-profit space for artists in San Francisco".

In 1979, Scarritt was a featured artist in Space/Time/Sound: Conceptual Art in the Bay Area, the 1970s, an exhibition curated by Suzanne Foley at the San Francisco Museum of Modern Art.

In 1981, Scarritt had a solo show at the Museum of Modern Art, Seven from Three (For Go). A multi-media installation, it repurposed video that Scarritt had contributed to Send/Receive, a project organized by Liza Bear and Keith Sonnier from September 10–11, 1977, where "communications between artists in verbal, visual, dance, musical forms took place for 15 hours via NASA satellite." In the later part of the 1980s, he began to focus on sculpture and photography, moving away from the audio-visual work he produced throughout the 1970s.

== Death ==
Scarritt died on July 1, 2023.

== Collections ==
- Museum of Modern Art
- Davis Museum at Wellesley College
