= Dante Marioni =

American artist (born 1964)

- Born: March 3, 1964 (age 62); Mill Valley, California
- Known for: Venetian style glassblowing
- Notable work: Whopper vases, Leaf Vases, Gambo Vases
- Website: dantemarioni.com

Dante Marioni (born March 3, 1964, in Mill Valley, California) is an American glass artist known for his mastery of Venetian glassblowing techniques and for his large-scale vessels based on classical forms. His work is characterized by bold color, refined geometry, and elongated proportions, and is held in museum collections internationally.

== Early life and education ==
Dante Marioni is the son of glass artist Paul Marioni and was introduced to glassworking at a young age. He grew up in an artistic environment, with close exposure to the American studio glass movement and to glassblowers in the San Francisco Bay Area. His uncles are artists Tom Marioni and Joseph Marioni.

In 1979, when his family moved to Seattle, Marioni began working with glass at the age of 15. He spent summers at the Pilchuck Glass School in Stanwood, Washington, where his father taught, and in 1983 took a glassblowing class at the Penland School of Crafts in North Carolina.

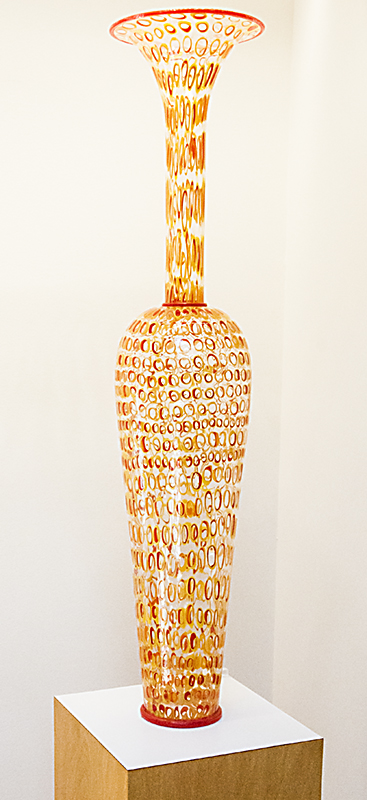
Murrine glass vessel, Dante Marioni, 2017

Marioni did not follow a formal academic art program but instead learned his craft through observation, close exposure, and informal guidance from leading glass artists. His primary influences included the Muranese master Lino Tagliapietra, as well as American glass artists Benjamin Moore and Richard Marquis.

== Career ==
In 1982, Marioni began working full-time at The Glass Eye as a production glassblower, primarily making goblets. His first solo exhibition was held at the Traver Gallery in Seattle in 1987. Over the course of his career, he has taught glassblowing in the United States, Australia, New Zealand, Japan, and across Europe.

Marioni produces vessels such as vases and amphorae based on classical forms, often made in bright primary colors or softer pastel tones. He also produces murrine vessels, using mosaic glass techniques.

== Artistic style ==
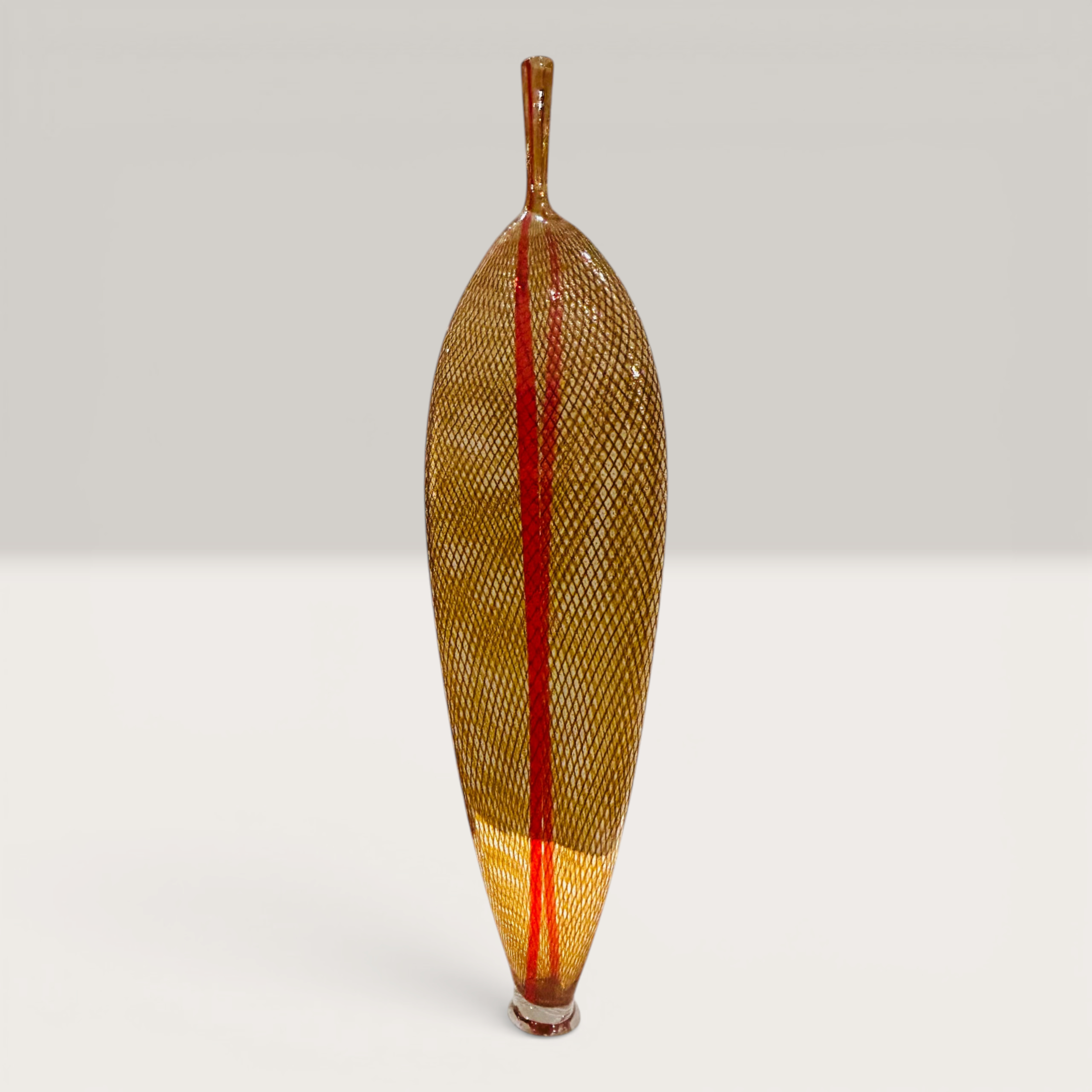
Marioni vase, Lauren Rogers Museum of Art, 2026

Marioni is known for his mastery of Venetian glassblowing techniques. His work is characterized by bold color, refined geometry, and carefully finished surfaces. He primarily creates functional vessel forms, including vases, pitchers, and cups, drawing on forms from ancient and Renaissance Italian art.

Drawing on Ancient Greek and Italian traditions, Marioni reinterprets classical vessel shapes, often elongating and exaggerating their proportions. His work is frequently produced at a large scale, with some pieces approaching 5 feet (1.5 m) in height. Elongated lines and unexpected proportions give his vases and urns a strong sculptural quality.

== Collections and recognition ==
Based in Washington, Marioni has received a number of honors, including a Louis Comfort Tiffany Foundation Award in 1987. His work is held in museum collections internationally, including the Corning Museum of Glass in Corning, New York; the Museum of New Zealand Te Papa Tongarewa in Auckland; the White House Collection of American Crafts; and the National Crafts Museum in Japan.

== Sources ==
- Hale, Julie, ed. (2010). Masters: Blown Glass: Major Works by Leading Artists. New York: Sterling Publishing. ISBN 978-1600594748.
- Oldknow, Tina (2000). Dante Marioni:Blown Glass. Hudson Hills Press. ISBN 978-1555952044.
