= Pilchuck Glass School =

International center for glass art education

Coordinates: 48°16′52″N 122°14′46″W

Pilchuck Glass School is an international center for glass art education. The school was founded in 1971 by Dale Chihuly, Ruth Tamura, Anne Gould Hauberg (1917-2016), and John H. Hauberg (1916-2002). The campus is located on a former tree farm in Stanwood, Washington, in the United States. The administrative offices are located in Seattle. The name "Pilchuck" comes from the Chinook Jargon language and translates to "red water" in reference to the Pilchuck River. Pilchuck offers one-, two-, or three-week resident classes each summer in a broad spectrum of glass techniques. They also offer residencies for emerging and established artists working in all media.

== History ==
Dale Chihuly, then the head of the glass program at Rhode Island School of Design, and Ruth Tamura, who ran the glass blowing program at California College of Arts and Crafts (CCAC, now California College of the Arts) applied early in 1971 for a grant from the Union of Independent Colleges of Art to operate a summer workshop in the medium of glass. In late spring the sum of $2,000 had been awarded. From the outset, this was planned as an unusual kind of workshop. Without yet having a site, but knowing he wanted to be somewhere in the Seattle area (Chihuly was born in Tacoma), Chihuly distributed posters advertising "the no deposit lots of returns glass, etc. workshop. Free tuition—you provide food and camping equipment." Sketches of lakes and forests and camping decorated the posters.

Through friends and contacts in the Seattle area, Chihuly and Tamura were introduced to John Hauberg and his wife Anne Gould Hauberg. Hauberg offered Chihuly the use of property he owned an hour north of Seattle. The workshop was held there and in time this became the location of the Pilchuck Glass School.

In 1971, the first workshop began with little time for advance preparation of the site. Chihuly and Tamura, along with two other teachers and 18 students, pitched surplus tents, made a makeshift lean-to with toilets and showers, and built a hot shop with glass furnaces (and a roof of sewn-together surplus tents). They began blowing glass just sixteen days after arriving at the Hauberg's tree farm. Some of the glass that was blown was sold at a craft fair in Anacortes nearby, and after the sale was well-received the group held an open house on the site. They sold more and the proceeds were used to pay for their propane. Even so, Chihuly spent far more than the $2,000 grant and ran up a considerable debt. John Hauberg, buoyed by the success of that first summer, paid off the bank loan and agreed to provide the location and financial support for a second summer workshop, and then a third. A few years later, realizing that Pilchuck glass workshops had become a summer mainstay rather than an occasional happening, the Haubergs established the school as a non-profit, solidifying the framework for today's Pilchuck Glass School.

In the first years facilities were primitive, but over time a campus was developed with a series of rustic structures, designed by Thomas Bosworth (who also served as the School's Director for several years). Thomas designed the Hot Shop for the kiln area (1973), Flat Shop for smaller scaled glass crafts (1976), Lodge (1977), faculty cottages, bathhouse, and other buildings; by 1986 there were fifteen structures on the site.

== Campus ==
The Pilchuck Glass School is located on a 54-acre (22 ha) rural campus, part of a 15,000-acre (6,100 ha) tree farm, located northeast of Stanwood, Washington and more than 50 miles (80 km) north of Seattle. The campus has more than 60 buildings, including workshops and living quarters.

== Summer education program ==
Offering programs throughout the year, Pilchuck Glass School's most concentrated activities occur from late May through early September when there are consecutive educational sessions, varying from one to three weeks in length, and offering several concurrent hands-on courses exploring different aspects of creating art in glass. Designed for the uninitiated, the intermediate, or the advanced student seeking skills and conceptual challenges with glass, courses are limited in size (typically ten to twelve students) and focus on glassmaking techniques and methods to glass art.

Students explore the creative possibilities of hot and cold glass in such areas as glassblowing, hot-glass sculpting, sand- and kiln-casting, fusing, neon, stained glass, imagery transfer on glass, flameworking, mixed-media sculpture, and engraving. Although enrolled in only one course in a session, students find additional creative resources among other students, instructors, artists in residence, gaffers and staff.

== Artist residencies ==
In addition to summer workshops, Pilchuck also offers residencies for artists and gaffers to simply work on their art throughout the year using Pilchuck's facilities. Several residency programs are available by application, and some others are available by invitation only.

Some of Pilchuck's residency offers vary from year to year, and each one often targets a different group of artists. For example, the Emerging Artist In Residence Program is advertised for artists who are just beginning a professional career. Their recurring John H. Hauberg Fellowship has repeatedly looked for artists who are already well established in their professional careers. Their Better Together Annual Residency looks for professional BIPOC artists.

== Notable faculty ==
- Sonja Blomdahl
- Ann Gardner
- Alena Matejkova
- Dana Zámečníková

== Notable alumni ==
- Jeff Ballard
- Phil Godenschwager
- Cynthia Lahti
- Debora Moore
- Susan Plum
- Therman Statom
- Reji Thomas
- Olga Volchkova
