= Paul Marioni =

American glass artist (1941–2026)

- Born: 1941 (age 84–85); Cincinnati, Ohio
- Died: 2026 (aged 84–85); Mexico
- Education: University of Cincinnati
- Known for: Studio glass, painted glass vessels
- Awards: Glass Art Society Lifetime Achievement Award

Paul Marioni (1941–2026) was an American glass artist and a founding figure in the studio glass movement. His work is known for its use of painted glass vessels, often featuring human figures, humor, and imagery drawn from dreams and everyday life. He taught widely in the United States and received the Glass Art Society’s Lifetime Achievement Award.

== Early life and education ==
Marioni was born in Cincinnati, Ohio. He graduated from the University of Cincinnati in 1967 with a degree in philosophy. He first worked as a filmmaker before turning to glass, drawn by its ability to explore light, reflection, and expression.

== Career ==
In the mid-1960s, Marioni moved to California, where he was drawn to San Francisco’s Beat poets and the city’s growing counterculture. In the early 1970s, he became part of a group of artists in the Bay Area working in stained glass.

Marioni is a founding figure in the American studio glass movement and received the Glass Art Society’s Lifetime Achievement Award. He has taught widely in the United States, including at the Penland School of Crafts and the Pilchuck Glass School from 1974 to 1988. He is a Fellow of the American Craft Council and has received three fellowships from the National Endowment for the Arts.

Marioni’s work explores human nature and is often inspired by his dreams. He creates playful, tactile works and encourages viewers to touch them. His painted glass vessels frequently feature human figures, and some are shaped in ways that recall the human body. His work often includes humor and visual wordplay, and incorporates a wide range of imagery, including human figures, masks, photographs, and themes related to sexuality.

== Public collections ==
Marioni's work is held by several museums, including the Museum of Arts & Design, Manhattan, New York City, Corning Museum of Glass, Corning, New York, the Smithsonian American Art Museum, Washington, DC, and the Frauenau Glass Museum, Frauenau, Germany

== Personal life ==
Marioni lived in Seattle, Washington for 27 years. He had two children, Marina and Dante, both of whom are artists. Marina is a jewelry maker and Dante is a glassblower. In 1998, Marioni and his son presented a feature exhibition of their glass at the Fresno Art Museum in California.

In 2019, Marioni moved to Central Mexico. He died in 2026.
