= Pratt Fine Arts Center =

Art school in Seattle, Washington

Coordinates: 47.6003°N 122.3074°W

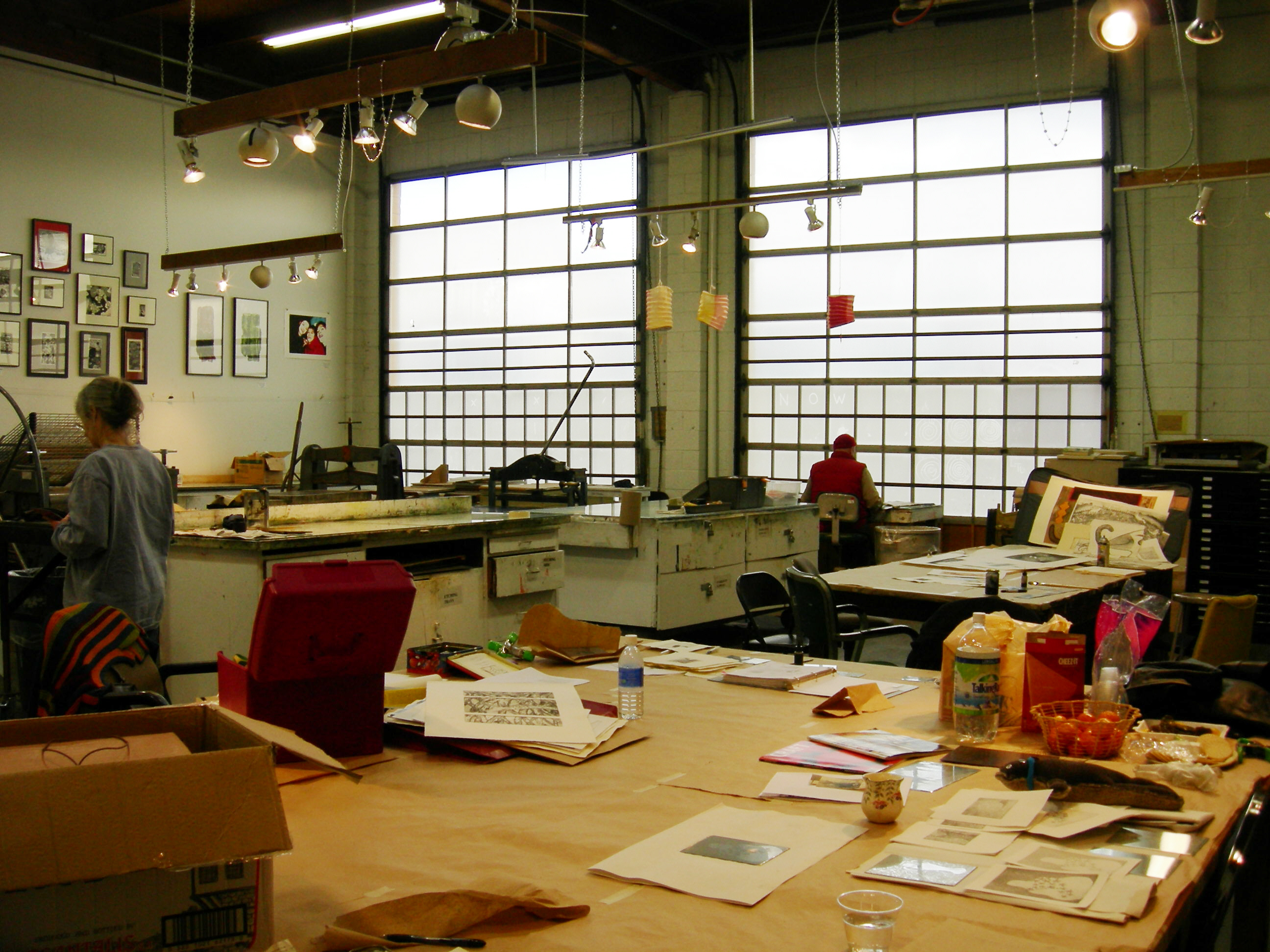
- Printmaking shop at Pratt
- Named after: Edwin T. Pratt
- Formation: 1976; 50 years ago
- Founder: Seattle Department of Parks and Recreation
- Type: Nonprofit
- Tax ID no.: 91-1186639
- Legal status: 501(c)(3) public charity
- Purpose: Education, resource center
- Headquarters: 1902 South Main Street
- Location: Seattle, United States
- Executive Director: Jessica Borusky
- Budget: $3 million (2019)
- Staff: 155
- Students: 4,335 (2019)
- Website: pratt.org

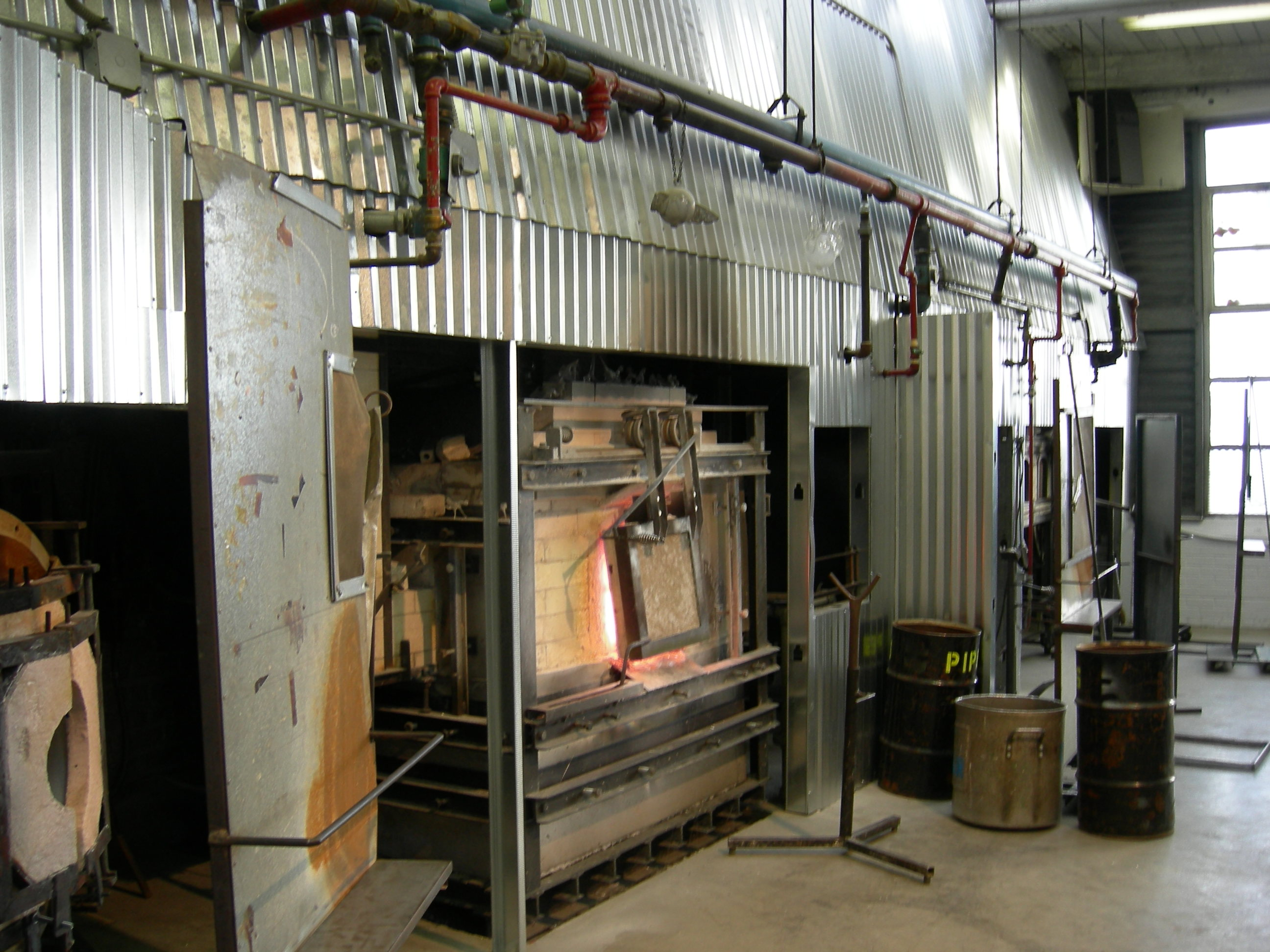
Hot glass (glassblowing) facility at Pratt

Pratt Fine Arts Center is a non-profit arts education and resource center in the Squire Park area of Seattle's Central District. The center employs 155 teaching artists and conducts more than 600 classes annually.

Pratt was founded in 1976 by the Seattle Department of Parks and Recreation and named in honor of slain civil rights leader Edwin T. Pratt. In 1982 it was turned over to a newly created 501(c)(3) non-profit, City Art Works. Since then, Pratt has grown into a nearly $3 million annual budget. With an average class size of 6.5 students, the school had 4,335 total class registrations in 2019.

Pratt includes facilities for glassblowing, lampworking, glass beadmaking, flameworked glass, metal sculpture, bronze casting, stone carving, jewelry and metalsmithing, woodworking, printmaking, painting and drawing. The Center has 14 studios across three buildings: the main building in Pratt Park (also named after Edwin Pratt) and two additional buildings in the block immediately south of the park. The latter two were originally part of the adjacent now empty Wonder Bread bakery.

Programs include adult and youth education (including free Saturday programs for youth), master artist intensives and visiting artist programs, and studio access programs for working artists. In 2019, Pratt served 960 youth and teens through education programs and granted 139 new independent artists access to its studios.
