= Tom Marioni =

American artist and educator (born 1937)

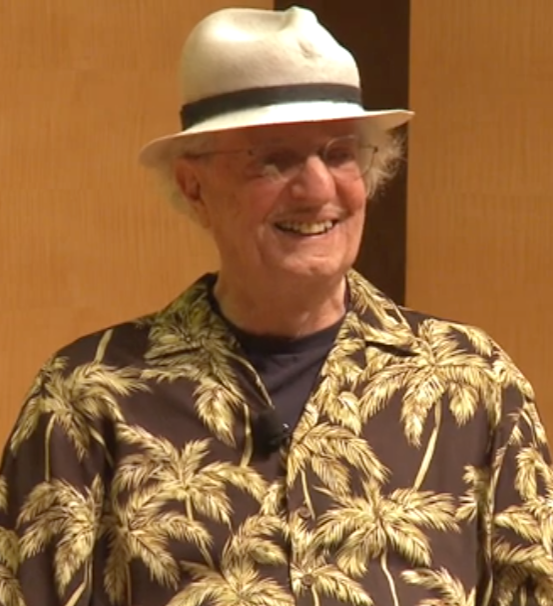
- At a talk at the San Francisco Public Library in 2022
- Born: 1937 (age 88–89); Cincinnati, Ohio, U.S.
- Other name: "Alan Fish"
- Education: Art Academy of Cincinnati
- Known for: Conceptual art
- Spouse: Kathan Brown (1983–present)

Tom Marioni (born 1937) is an American artist and educator, known for his conceptual artwork. Marioni was active in the emergence of Conceptual Art movement in the 1960s. He founded the Museum of Conceptual Art (MOCA), which operated in San Francisco from 1970 until 1984.

He is currently living and working out of San Francisco, California.

== History ==
Marioni was born 1937 in Cincinnati, Ohio, into an Italian American family with three brothers. His father John "Sereno" Marioni was a general practitioner doctor and "Sunday painter" and his mother sang opera and played the harp and the piano. As a child Tom learned to play the violin and in middle school he trained with the Cincinnati Conservatory – around this time he also became interested in jazz music. He was raised Catholic and attended a Catholic Boys School from grade school through high school. Two of his brother went on to become artists, Paul Marioni and Joseph Marioni, and a nephew, Dante Marioni. Marioni received his art training at the Art Academy of Cincinnati between 1955 and 1959.

He moved to San Francisco, California after graduating in 1959. He was stationed in Germany with the United States Army from 1960 to 1963. The Museum of Conceptual Art (MOCA) was founded in the 1970 by Marioni, who described conceptual art as "social artwork". From 1975 to 1982, he was editor of Vision, an art journal published by Crown Point Press. From 1986 until 1971, he served as the curator at the Richmond Art Center in Richmond, California.

He used the pseudonym and alter-ego Alan Fish in some early performances.

Famous works by Marioni include One Second Sculpture (1969) and The Act of Drinking Beer with Friends is the Highest Form of Art (1970).

Marioni's work is included in many public museum collections, including San Francisco Museum of Modern Art (SFMoMA) and Fine Arts Museums of San Francisco (FAMSF).

Marioni is also known for his Wednesday night art salon he has been holding for over 40 years. In November 2008 the San Francisco Museum of Modern Art recreated his salon and served free beer every Thursday night for the duration of the show.

== Personal life ==
Marioni married Kathan Brown of Crown Point Press in 1983, and he has three sons.

== Publications ==
- Marioni, Tom (2004). Beer, Art and Philosophy: A Memoir by Tom Marioni, The Act of Drinking Beer with Friends is the Highest Form of Art. San Francisco, California: Crown Point Press. ISBN 978-1891300172.
