= Museum of Conceptual Art =

Museum in San Francisco

The Museum of Conceptual Art (MOCA) was founded in 1970 by artist Tom Marioni, who describes conceptual art as a "social artwork". The museum moved into its second location on January 3, 1973 at 75 Third Street above Breen’s Bar in San Francisco, California.

The museum closed its doors in 1984.

== History ==
It was one of the three major centers for conceptual art in California in the 1970s, exhibiting paintings centered on the theory of conceptual art ("art as Idea") as well as featuring "life art". In 1973 during the peak attendance, artists Joseph Beuys, Chris Burden, and Dan Graham performed at MOCA. Starting in 1973, MOCA’s Free Beer every Wednesday program offered free beer and viewings of artist videos. Marioni continued his weekly beer drinking salon with friends, even after the museum closed. Many of the participants of MOCA were male which was unusual for the time period and the location, the exception to this being artists Barbara Smith and Linda Montano.

The museum closed its doors in 1984.
