= John Littleton and Kate Vogel =

American studio glass artists (born 1957 & 1956)

John Littleton/Kate Vogel
- Born: August 25, 1957/August 11, 1956; Madison, Wisconsin/Wimpole Park, Cambridgeshire, England
- Other names: John C. Littleton/Katherine E. Vogel, Kate E. Vogel
- Occupation: Glass artists

John Littleton (born 1957) and Kate Vogel (born 1956) are American studio glass artists who have worked collaboratively since 1979. They are considered to be among the third generation of American Studio Glass Movement artists who trace their roots to the work of Harvey Littleton in the 1960s. John Littleton, the youngest child of Harvey Littleton, grew up in the shadow of his father's accomplishments in Madison, Wisconsin, where he experienced first-hand the personalities and events of the early glass movement. Glass, however, was not John Littleton's first medium of choice when it came time for him to select a career. It was only after majoring in photography at the University of Wisconsin–Madison that he began to create in glass. He soon formed a collaborative partnership with another art student, Kate Vogel, who had exchanged her study of two dimensional art for glass. The artists' earliest collaborations in glass were the bag forms for which they are now well known. Since 2000 their work has included a series of arms and hands cast in amber-colored glass. Over the years the hands have held various objects, including river stones, large faceted glass "jewels", and colorful cast glass leaves. In recent years Littleton and Vogel have also become known for their series of functional glass and wrought iron side tables.

== Early life ==
John Littleton is the son of glass artist Harvey Littleton and his wife, Bess Tamura Littleton. He was born in 1957 in Madison, Wisconsin, where his father was a professor of art at the University of Wisconsin. Known as the father of the Studio Glass Movement, Harvey Littleton had introduced glass as a medium for the studio artist in two workshops that he organized on the grounds the Toledo Museum of Art in 1962. That fall, Littleton began teaching glass in a garage at his rural Wisconsin home and later secured University of Wisconsin funding to rent and equip an off-campus glass department in Madison. Harvey Littleton soon gained significant exposure for his artwork in glass and became a self-described "evangelist" for the medium, lecturing about its potential for the studio artist throughout the Midwest and Northeastern United States.

As a boy John Littleton grew up around glass art and his father's colleagues in glass, including Dale Chihuly, Fritz Dreisbach, Erwin Eisch, Robert C. Fritz and Marvin Lipofsky. When it came time to select a course of study in college, John Littleton, in a bid to establish his identity apart from that of his father, majored in photography with Cavalierre Ketchum (b. 1934) and did independent study in glass with David Willard. He graduated in 1979 with a Bachelor of Science in art from the University of Wisconsin–Madison.

Kate Vogel was born in 1956 in Cambridgeshire, England, to David and Patricia Vogel. David Vogel, who studied at Massachusetts Institute of Technology (MIT) on an ROTC scholarship, was serving in the U.S. Army there. Vogel and his young family returned to the United States when Kate was about two years old. They settled in Madison, Wisconsin, where David went to work for the family-owned Vogel Brothers Building Company. He served as president of the company, and, as of 2017, was chairman of the board. As a college student at the University of Wisconsin, Kate Vogel initially studied two-dimensional art, specifically drawing and painting. In 1977 she was enrolled in a summer course at Santa Reperata Graphic Arts Center in Florence, Italy. While in Italy she took a trip to the Venetian island of Murano where she visited some of the glass factories. On the recommendation of a fellow student, Vogel enrolled in the University of Wisconsin's glass program under David Willard. She received the Bachelor of Science in art in 1978.

Vogel and Littleton met while both were in college. Their first collaboration in glass took place in 1979 at the Spruce Pine, North Carolina studio of Harvey Littleton, who had relocated there three years earlier, after his retirement from the University of Wisconsin. John Littleton and Kate Vogel moved to North Carolina in the summer of 1979, eventually settling in Bakersville, where they built their studio and hot shop. In North Carolina's Blue Ridge Mountains they found themselves in the midst of a growing community of glass artists, including Rick and Valerie Beck, Gary Beecham, Katherine and William Bernstein, Shane Fero, Rob Levin, Mark Peiser, Richard Ritter, Jeffrey M. Todd, Yaffa Sikorsky-Todd and Jan Williams. For Kate Vogel, the sense of community was "wonderful" because it not only allowed her to see what her peers were doing aesthetically, but also to consult with them on technical questions.

== Blown glass works ==
John Littleton/Kate Vogel This sculpture is typical of the artists' "Acrobag" forms

Littleton and Vogel's first successful sculptures took the form of "Bags"; blown glass bubbles that were shaped to look like soft fabric bundles "tied" at the neck with a loop of glass and terminating in a flared ruff. The bags were quickly followed by two series of forms that had elements in common with them. "Handkerchiefs" took the form of soft inverted cones with flared, undulating lips; "Favors" featured an ovoid or lobed form with two flared rills of glass on either side, resembling a lump of candy twisted in colorful paper.

At the beginning of their collaborative career Littleton and Vogel exploited the ability of glass to retain the appearance of its hot fluidity even after cooling into a solid. In a catalog statement for the first exhibition of their collaborative work the artists wrote, "With the bag, handkerchief and favor forms we try to freeze some of the molten quality of the glass." It was the bags, however, that presented the most possibilities for variation and evolution. The artists' sense of play became more evident as the bags referred less to their inanimate prototypes than to biopomorphic forms. In 1982 the artists were showing large transparent bags in which smaller translucent bags rested. According to artist and writer Joan Falconer Byrd, the bags "gradually assumed the nature of seedpod and womb."

The "Shard" series of bags that Littleton and Vogel began showing in 1984 got its start by accident. On their way to a glass art conference in New York, a bag piece that was traveling with them broke. As Vogel recalled, "We looked at the broken piece for three or four days in our hotel room and got interested in it." Upon their return to the studio, they learned to cut and open the hot glass bubble; into these fragments they would nestle small glass bags. About this time they also began to sand blast and acid etch the exterior surfaces of the bags to produce a deceptively soft texture with a satiny sheen. By the end of the '80s the artists were creating "Bag Explosions," in which small bags seemed to tumble and float from the jagged opening of a large bag.

The sharply defined, polished edges of the "Shards" began to suggest flower forms to the artists, and so their "Flora" series began. Cutting open the hot bubble the collaborators produced blooms with long ray-like petals surrounding a delicate glass stamen. At first the stems were short and made of the same glass as the petals; later the stems became curving stalks of transparent, colorless glass. The "Flora" series ended in 1988.

== Cast glass works ==
John Littleton/Kate Vogel This sculpture belongs to the artists' "Clarity Imprisoned" series of forms

Although Littleton had cast a gloved hand in glass in 1979, it was not until 1989 that he and Vogel began to explore glass casting in earnest. The large, work-worn hands of an artist friend inspired one of their early sculptures; initially cast in plaster, the hands and arms, as well as the faces, of family members and friends, children and adults, appeared in subsequent works. Their "Crystal" series includes blocks of colorless crystal glass, faceted to look like large pieces of rock crystal; in the center of the transparent forms frosty white hands (which are actually hand-shaped voids in the glass) hold small rock crystals aloft. The artists left these crystalline forms in favor of cast cubes of crystal that entrap three-dimensional faces and hands. The human forms soon broke free of the cube, appearing in the round with the fine details of skin texture, wrinkles and hair preserved from the original plaster casting. These works appeared in colorless and purple tinted glass. During the 1990s the glass, tinted blue, mimicked "water" from which colorless glass faces and hands seemed to arise. In the brochure for the a twenty-year retrospective of the artists' work, Joan Byrd wrote of the dichotomy between the continuing series of Bags and the cast sculptures. In the blown pieces

...the work is playful and seems effortless. The cast sculptures, on the other hand, bear the weight of profound adult concerns. Primarily colorless or monochromatic, these pieces are monumental in aspect.

== Work since 2000 ==
John Littleton/Kate Vogel, Leaf Fan

Littleton and Vogel continued to produce bags, adding their "Acrobags" and "Imago" series of works (both of which feature small bags balancing on top of a single large one) in the late 1990s to their continuing line of "Bag Explosions." By mid-decade the artists' cast sculptures focused exclusively on hands and arms posed in the act of proffering an object. Earlier in the decade smooth stones, found by the artists on walks, were the objects of choice; these gave way to hot-worked glass spheres, discs and faceted glass "jewels" made by the artists. After 2006 the artists created cast glass leaves for the hands to uphold. Other objects included electroplated glass snakes, gold electroplated pennies and, in one instance, a decoratively painted violin. In 2006 the artists began to produce functional tables of cast and blown glass supported by a wrought iron armature. The tops of the tables, flat discs cast with the impressions of vines and leaves, were inspired by the artists' trip to Costa Rica. On a tour of the rain forest, high above the ground on a suspended walkway, Littleton and Vogel looked down on a "tangled web of plants [that] became radial patterns and spirals as the ferns and trees reached for the light."

== Teaching ==
Littleton and Vogel taught at Penland School of Crafts, Penland, North Carolina in 1987 and 1993. They co-taught a workshop at the University of North Carolina, Wilmington in 2007. The artists have lectured at a number of venues including the Mint Museum of Art, St. Louis Art Museum and Appalachian State University.

== Exhibitions ==
Littleton and Vogel have exhibited in shows featuring their work at Hodgell Gallery in Sarasota, Florida (2008); Piedmont Craftsmen, Winston-Salem, North Carolina (2005), Philabaum Gallery, Tucson, Arizona (2003) Maurine Littleton Gallery, Washington, DC (2001, 1994, 1992, 1988, 1982), and Western Carolina University, Cullowhee, North Carolina (2000). With Harvey Littleton, the artists have been featured in the exhibitions "Generations: Harvey Littleton, John Littleton and Kate Vogel" at the Folk Art Center in Asheville, North Carolina (1995) and "Three Generations in Glass" at Heller Gallery, New York City (1983).

The artists' work has appeared in numerous group exhibitions. Through the Maurine Littleton Gallery, their glass sculptures were seen annually at the Sculptural Objects and Functional Art (SOFA) expositions in New York City from 1998 through 2007; in Chicago from 1988 through 2007 and in Miami from 1994 through 1999. Other notable exhibitions in which Littleton and Vogel's work has appeared include "The White House Collection of American Craft" organized by the Smithsonian Institution. The exhibition opened at the Smithsonian's National Museum of American Art in 1994 and toured throughout the United States until 2004. Internationally Littleton and Vogel's work has been seen in "The Visible Man" (2003) and "North Carolina Glass" (1995) exhibitions at the Glasmuseum Ebeltoft in Denmark and through the U.S. Department of State's Art in Embassies program in Hong Kong, Gabon and Belgium beginning in the late 1980s and continuing through the 1990s. Their work was also included in "North Carolina Glass '90" at Western Carolina University (1990). That exhibition went on tour to Germany, Austria, Switzerland and the Netherlands.

== Collections ==
John Littleton and Kate Vogel's works in glass are in the collections of the Palmer Museum of Art, State College, Pennsylvania; High Museum of Art, Atlanta, Georgia; Mint Museum of Art in Charlotte, North Carolina; St. Louis Art Museum, Missouri; New Orleans Museum of Art, Louisiana; Milwaukee Art Museum, Wisconsin; Racine Art Museum, Racine, Wisconsin; The William J. Clinton Presidential Library, Little Rock, Arkansas, Glasmuseet Ebeltoft, Denmark; Glasmuseum Frauenau, Bavaria, Germany and the Museum of Contemporary Design and Applied Arts in Lausanne, Switzerland.

== Personal ==
Littleton and Vogel were married on July 27, 1985. They have three children; a daughter, Annalisa, and two sons, Erik and Jonpaul.
