= Vitreography =

Glass art printmaking technique

Vitreography is a fine art printmaking technique that uses a 3/8-inch-thick (9.5 mm) float glass matrix instead of the traditional matrices of metal, wood or stone. A print created using the technique is called a vitreograph. Unlike a monotype, in which ink is painted onto a smooth glass plate and transferred to paper to produce a unique work, the vitreograph technique involves fixing the imagery in, or on, the glass plate. This allows the production of an edition of prints.

Glen Alps, Pilchuck Summer (1987) Edition of 40. Plate size: 18 × 24 inches. This color print on paper is an intaglio vitreograph. It was printed from a glass matrix.

== Advantages/disadvantages of vitreography ==
In addition to being relatively inexpensive, glass is chemically inert. It does not oxidize, nor does it change or interact with the composition of printing inks, especially yellows and whites, which can turn green or gray in contact with metal plates. According to Claire Van Vliet of Janus Press, intaglio vitreographs also have an advantage over metal in that the glass plate wipes cleanly in non-image areas, allowing bright white to coincide with “black that is velvety as a mezzotint” in the finished print.

Another advantage of vitreograph printmaking is its ability to withstand the pressure of the printing press with no discernible breakdown of the imagery, even after numerous runs. Printmaker Ken Kerslake wrote, “The glass plate will last indefinitely because, unlike [one of] copper or zinc, it will always return to its original configuration no matter how much pressure is applied.” A disadvantage to this is that unwanted lines or marks on the glass plate cannot be burnished out, as they can on a zinc or copper plate.

The transparency of the glass plate can be used to advantage, in that the plate may be placed over a preliminary drawing on paper to guide the artist in creating a drawing on the plate. This is done by placing the drawing face down on a light table (to allow for the reversal of the image in printing) and placing the vitreograph plate on top of it. Although glass is unaffected by compression in the printing press, it will break under tension. For that reason, vitreographs are always printed on an etching press, whose rigid bed will support the glass plate firmly. In addition, the press bed must be level and working conditions in the print shop immaculate. A particle of grit or dirt between press bed and the plate will create a tension point that will cause the glass to crack when pressure is applied.

== Development of vitreography ==
American glass artist Harvey Littleton was a tenured professor of art at the University of Wisconsin in Madison when, in June 1974, he taught a workshop in cold-working techniques for glass artists. To cold-work glass is to shape or sculpt cold (as opposed to hot or molten) glass, or to produce texture or decoration on its surface. Cold-working is done by carving, grinding or engraving glass with various tools, or by selectively blasting it with abrasives. As a result of experimenting with various resists for sandblasting, Littleton became intrigued by the possibility of printmaking from glass. He asked his colleague at the University of Wisconsin, printmaker Warrington Colescott, to ink five of the sandblasted plates from the workshop and print them onto paper in his etching press. The first plate broke under pressure, but after making some adjustments to the press, the rest of the glass plates printed “like dreamboats,” Colescott said. Editions printed from the plates looked promising, and Littleton was awarded a research grant from the University of Wisconsin to continue the development of printing from glass.

In 1976 Littleton retired from teaching and moved to Spruce Pine, North Carolina, where he set up a glass studio, reserving space for an etching press on which he continued to make vitreograph prints. A few years later, at the end of 1981, he hired a woodcut artist, Sandy Willcox, to work as a part-time printer. He encouraged her and his colleagues in glass art, including Ken Carder, Billy Bernstein, Erwin Eisch and Ann Wolff (formerly Wärff), to try their hands at vitreography.

In 1982 Littleton invited curator Jane Kessler of the Mint Museum in Charlotte, North Carolina to see the prints that were being created at Littleton Studios. Kessler was impressed by the new technique, and recommended that experienced painters and printmakers be invited to the studio to explore the medium. A grant awarded by the National Endowment for the Arts made it possible for three painters, Walter Darby Bannard, Ed Blackburn and Hollis Sigler to collaborate with two master printers, Paul Maguire of Flatrock Press and June Lambla, who had apprenticed at Crown Point Press, in the creation of prints at Littleton Studios. By this time Littleton had constructed a fully equipped printmaking studio that was separate from his glassblowing shop. Sigler visited Littleton Studios in 1985 and produced five prints; Blackburn produced five prints in 1986 and Bannard created seven prints in 1987. The project led to an exhibition at the Mint Museum in 1987 that included a catalog detailing these and other artists’ research in glass plate printmaking. Littleton continued to invite painters, printmakers, potters and glass artists to the studio to fully develop the possibilities of vitreography. Littleton Studios has published vitreograph print editions by 110 artists.

== Processes ==
Vitreography was initially conceived of as an intaglio process, in which line and tone are carved, engraved or etched into the glass plate's surface. Printing an intaglio plate involves forcing ink into the grooves and pits, and then wiping the plate's surface with tarlatan to remove excess ink. The image is transferred to dampened paper under pressure in an etching press. Color intaglio prints are achieved by processing separate plates, each carrying one or more colors in proportion to the effect desired in the print. The plates are printed in succession onto paper, each carrying color and imagery that, in register with the others, combine to form the finished print.

Tools used to make marks in the glass include diamond point scribers, a flexible shaft power tool with a diamond bit and a sandblaster. Littleton Studios printer Sandy Willcox and her husband David Lewis, a painter, are credited with discovering that white lithograph ink is a versatile resist for sandblasting intaglio glass plates. They found that the viscous white ink, applied to the plate freely with a brush or evenly with a roller, can be drawn into by removing ink with wooden styluses, needles, or paintbrushes. When the drawing is complete, the plate is taken to the sandblasting booth wet. There, the initial onslaught of sand sticks to those areas of the image where ink remains (forming an even more resistant barrier) while etching those parts of the glass revealed by the hand of the artist. After the plate is cleaned of ink, the parts of the plate that received the blast can be seen to have minute pits that hold ink; the areas that were protected by the white litho ink remain smooth and are wiped clean before printing. Contact paper and tape are also used on the plates as a sandblasting resist; those materials create imagery with a hard-edged, stencil effect. Diluted hydrofluoric acid can be brushed onto the plate to create areas of very delicate tone.

Judith O'Rourke, Soul Sleeper (1996) Edition of 10, Plate size: 12½ × 17½ inches. This print was made using the technique of siligraphy on a glass vitreograph plate. It is printed in four colors on paper.

A second method of creating imagery on the vitreograph plate is waterless lithography (sometimes called “siligraphy”). The process was originally developed by 3M Company for commercial printing in the late 1960s; it was purchased and subsequently refined by Toray Industries of Japan. The commercial process is a type of offset printing that uses photo-sensitized silicone rubber plates. The waterless lithography process employed in fine art printmaking has been credited to Nik Semenoff, who developed it for use on metal plates. Donald Furst demonstrated his adaptation of the silicone method to glass plate printmaking in June, 1995, and the Littleton Studios adopted his process for their work with glass plate lithography. The image is drawn onto a ground glass matrix with water-soluble art materials, over which is applied a film of common caulking silicone thinned with synthetic turpentine. Master printer Mark Mahaffey has found that frosted Mylar can be used as a printing matrix as well as 3/8” float glass to create a vitreograph using waterless lithography.

After the silicone layer cures, the original drawing is gently washed from the plate with water, dried, and inked with a roller. The silicone layer protects the non-printing areas of the image while allowing open areas (those free of silicone) to accept ink. Like intaglio vitreographs, waterless lithographs on glass plates are transferred to paper in an etching press.

In 1998 Littleton invited three artists, Bonnie Pierce Lhotka, Karin Schminke and Dorothy Simpson Krause (collectively known as the Digital Atelier), to investigate combining digital imagery with vitreography processes. The artists printed digital images onto clear transfer film using a large format inkjet printer, transferring them to paper in the etching press, along with glass plate imagery processed in the intaglio and/or siligraph techniques.

== Artists at Littleton Studios ==
Since 1981 over 100 artists have worked in collaboration with Littleton Studios to publish vitreograph prints. They include Harvey Littleton's colleagues in glass art, Dale Chihuly, Erwin Eisch, Shane Fero, Stanislav Libenský, Andy Owen, Paul Stankard, Therman Statom, Sybren Valkema and Ann Wolff. Littleton also invited painters, sculptors and printmakers to Littleton Studios to explore the possibilities and limitations of vitreography. Painters Walter Darby Bannard, Louisa Chase, Herb Jackson, Mildred Thompson, Emilio Vedova and John Wilde; potters Cynthia Bringle and John Glick, sculptors Sergei Isupov and Italo Scanga and printmakers Glen Alps, Ken Kerslake, Karen Kunc, Tom Nakashima, Judith O’Rourke and Dan Welden and are a few of the artists whose work has been published by the studio.

== Exhibition of vitreographs ==
The first public exhibition of Littleton's own intaglio prints from glass plates was at the Brooks Memorial Art Museum in Memphis, Tennessee in 1975. There the prints were shown along with Littleton's glass sculptures. The same was the case with Ann Wolff's glass plate intaglios, which were included in a show of her glass artworks, drawings and copper plate intaglios in 1986 at Holsten Galleries in Palm Beach.

The first group exhibition of the prints to include works by painters and printmakers, as well as glass artists, was at Western Carolina University in Cullowhee, North Carolina in 1986. Seventeen artists were represented in the exhibition, all of whom had created their prints at Littleton Studios.

The Mint Museum mounted another group exhibition in 1987 titled Luminous Impressions: Prints from Glass Plates. It featured vitreographs by nineteen artists and included prints by glass artist Dale Chihuly and California printmaker Connor Everts. Everts is credited with coining the term “vitreography” to describe printmaking from glass plates. Another early group exhibition took place in 1988 at the Kunstsammlungen der Veste Coburg in Coburg, Germany. Titled "Prints from Glass Plates – Vitreographs," the show featured works by Americans and two Germans: Erwin Eisch and Ann Wolff.

Other notable group exhibitions include Vitreographs: Collaborative Works from the Littleton Studio which was exhibited at The Hunter Museum of American Art in Chattanooga, Tennessee and The University Gallery at The University of Florida at Gainesville (both in 1993); “Vitreographs” at The Portland Art Museum in Portland, Oregon in 1997 and “Vitreographs: Collaborative Works from Littleton Studio” at the Center for the Arts in Vero Beach, Florida in 1998.

Recent group exhibitions include Reflections on a Legacy: Vitreographs from Littleton Studios at Appalachian State University in Boone, North Carolina (2006) and Harvey K. Littleton + Friends: A Legacy of Transforming Object, Image & Idea, at Western Carolina University in Cullowhee, North Carolina (2006–07). The latter was an exhibition of the work of 75 artworks by seventeen artists, and included vitreographs alongside works in glass, clay, ceramic, painting and book art. Curator Martin DeWitt wrote in the catalog accompanying the exhibition that “Not only is Littleton credited to be the father of the contemporary studio glass movement in the United States…he is also inventor and progenitor of the versatile and unique vitreographic printmaking process.”

== Vitreographs in public collections ==
Vitreograph prints can be found in collections in the United States, including the Achenbach Foundation for Graphic Art, San Francisco; Burroughs Chapin Art Museum, Myrtle Beach, South Carolina; Cincinnati Art Museum, Cincinnati, Ohio; The Corning Museum of Glass, Corning, New York; Samuel P. Harn Museum of Art, University of Florida, Gainesville, Florida; Milwaukee Art Museum, Milwaukee, Wisconsin; Museum of Fine Arts, New Britain Museum of American Art, New Britain Connecticut which holds an archive of over 500 vitreographs, St. Petersburg, Florida; Portland Art Museum, Portland, Oregon; Sherwin Miller Museum of Jewish Art, Tulsa, Oklahoma; Smithsonian American Art Museum, Washington, DC; Tweed Museum of Art, Duluth, Minnesota and the Vero Beach Museum of Art, Vero Beach, Florida. The Fine Art Museum of Western Carolina University holds an archive of 723 vitreograph editions published at Littleton Studios.
