= Michael Taylor (glass artist) =

American glass artist, teacher and lecturer (born 1944)

- Born: 1944 (age 81–82); Lewisburg, Tennessee, U.S.
- Other names: Michael Estes Taylor, Michael E. Taylor
- Occupations: Artist, educator
- Known for: Geometric fused glass sculptures

Michael Taylor (born 1944) is an American studio glass artist, teacher and lecturer. His best known body of work is his geometric glass sculptures. He works the glass cold, shaping, polishing and laminating translucent colored and clear blocks of glass together using epoxy resin.

== Early life and education ==
Michael Estes Taylor was born in Lewisburg, Tennessee and began to draw at age 12. At age 18 he entered Middle Tennessee University in Murfreesboro where he was awarded a B.S. in art education. He entered graduate school in 1967 at East Tennessee University in Johnson City, where he received a summer scholarship to Penland School of Crafts. There he was first exposed to glass as an artist's medium. He returned to Penland in 1968 and, with the encouragement of glass artist Fritz Dreisbach, began to work with glass. Taylor graduated from East Tennessee University in 1969 with an M.A. in sculpture and ceramics. That summer he studied glass at the University of Utah under University of California-Berkeley instructor Marvin Lipofsky. In the fall Taylor returned to Tusculum College in Greenville, Tennessee, where he was working as a part-time art instructor, to take a full-time teaching position.

In 1970 Taylor attended the Toledo Museum School's Glass Workshop, where he met a number of the artists involved in the Studio Glass Movement, including Dominick Labino, Harvey Littleton, Harvey Leafgreen, Jack Schmidt, Doug Johnson, Tom McGlauchlin and Henry Halem. Returning to Tusculum College, Taylor won a Louis Comfort Tiffany grant to work with Harvey Littleton at Littleton's studio in Verona, Wisconsin. In 1977, while serving as the chair of the art department at Peabody College, Taylor returned to graduate school at East Tennessee State University, where he was awarded an M.F.A. in sculpture.

== Teaching ==
Taylor accepted his first teaching position in 1968 at Tusculum College, where he built a glass facility in 1971. He left Tusculum in 1972 for a job as an associate professor of art at Peabody College of Vanderbilt University. In addition to his duties at Peabody, Taylor lectured at Penland and taught during the summer at Haystack Mountain School of Crafts and Naples Mills School of Arts and Crafts in Naples, New York. He also found time to begin glass programs at the University of South Carolina in Columbia, Maryland Institute College of Art in Baltimore and Peters Valley Craft Center near Layton, New Jersey.

From 1979–80 Taylor was an associate professor of art at the College of Idaho. During this time he also lectured and presented workshops at California State University at Chico and the University of California campuses at Davis and San Luis Obispo. He taught at Kent State University in Ohio in the summer. In 1981 he was hired by the Rochester Institute of Technology to head its glass program, a position that he held for 19 years. In 1988 he took time out to teach at the Tokyo Glass Art Institute in Japan, and in 1991–1994 he served with the United States Department of Information Services as a specialist to the glass community in Monterrey, Mexico. In 1998 he lectured in Seoul, Korea at Namseoul University. In 2000 he retired from Rochester Institute of Technology. In 2005 he was awarded a professorship at Universidade Nova de Lisboa, Facauldade de Ciências e Tecnologia in Lisbon, Portugal.

Glass artists who studied under Michael Taylor include Jiyong Lee, Jonathan Schmuck, and Sam Stark.

== Early work ==
Taylor began his career as an artist in ceramics. His earliest series, "Analytical Perspectives" of 1965–66, focused on the vessel format. In the "Libidinous Manifest" series of 1969 Taylor sculpted organic ceramic forms that he placed open-end down on wood pedestals to proclaim their alliance with sculpture. In contradiction to the sensual knobs and bulges of his forms, Taylor painted the sculptures with shiny enamel in eye-popping colors. The addition of hard-edged geometric shapes and stripes painted on the forms further challenged the biomorphic forms while the addition of rayon flocking and in, one case ("Libidinous Manifest #10"), a clinging web of red crocheted yarn placed the works firmly in the era of psychedelic imagery. Also in 1969, Taylor took his first foray into glassblowing. Early works included the "Glass Fabrication" series, in which Taylor combine blown glass forms with grommets, plate glass and automotive products, such as motor oil and anti-freeze. A trip to Scandinavia in 1974 gave Taylor the opportunity to work at the Johansfors Glasbruk in the province of Småland, Sweden where he developed his "Johansfors" series. There he created sculptures by cutting and assembling clear glass forms manufactured by the factory. Upon his return to his Nashville, Tennessee studio Taylor continued his exploration of cut and assembled clear glass forms in his 1975–76 "N-Sequence" series. The artist found that the soda-lime glass that he used to make the forms for this series had impurities in it that caused striations in the glass; these he felt, distracted from the appreciation of the sculptures. In subsequent series of fabricated glass sculptures Taylor created his forms in borosilicate glass, the same substance of which Pyrex laboratory glass is made.

== Transitional work ==
At the beginning of the 1980s Taylor's work in glass turned to classic vessel forms based on ancient Greek kraters, lekythoi and amphoras. At first the surfaces of these bulging forms displayed colorful spots and splotches that contrasted with the solid body color of the vessels; but a trip to the desert regions of Idaho and Oregon influenced Taylor to wrap the surfaces of his vessels in landscape-like configurations of color. In 1980 Taylor returned briefly to ceramic, folding and draping slabs of porcelain into twisting, gestural forms. These he airbrushed in black and brown glazes to emphasize the forms' depth.

== Mature work ==
In 1982, Taylor moved to Rochester, New York, to head the glass program at Rochester Institute of Technology's College of Fine and Applied Arts. He returned to the symmetry and precision of his machine-like glass constructions, this time finding inspiration in the world of medicine and surgery. His "Surgical Expansion" series, fabricated from factory-manufactured plate glass and glass tubing, featured scalpel-sharp pieces of beveled glass sheathed, and yet perfectly visible, inside transparent glass cylinders. Color began to come into these transparent pieces with the use of tinted industrial glass in peach, solar gray, solar bronze and blue as well as colorless glass. By 1983, he was laminating squares and rectangles of different colors of glass together to create tonal variations within a single work. In the mid-1980s, Taylor was using bright color in small sections to focus the viewer's attention on central or connecting parts in a sculpture's composition. At that time, he used the prefix "photo-" in his titles, as in "Photogenesis," "Photoreceptor" and "Photogenerator", to emphasize the interaction of light with his prismatic creations. Since that time, Taylor's work has increased in compositional complexity. Cast pieces of flawless cast optical glass came into his repertoire in the late 1980s, and these, laminated with thin layers of brilliant color, became the basis of his work after 1991.

== Influences ==
The artist has said that the off-center balance of his sculptures was influenced early on, when he saw the series "Bottled Spirits" by the German glass artist Erwin Eisch. Taylor said that Eisch's series was "about controlled pandemonium," or "tranquil chaos," a spontaneous quality that he tries to apply to his own work. The twentieth century Russian art movement, Constructivism has been a major influence on Taylor's art, not only because "it is deliberately composed" and non-representational, but also because the Constructivist seeks to touch human emotions and intellect through the highly formalized language of graphic art and architecture. Taylor feels a kinship with the minimal artist Dan Flavin because of that artist's professed interest in Russian Constructivism. Artists James Turrell and Robert Irwin also influenced Taylor because of their environmental use of light and light-sensitive materials.

Taylor has expressed admiration for the modern artists Jackson Pollock, Piet Mondrian, Marcel Duchamp and Louise Nevelson as much for the revolutionary effect of their ideas on the course of art history as for the formal and visual qualities of their oeuvres.

In a general way the structural model of DNA and electronic circuitry bear a visual resemblance to Taylor's constructions in glass. Taylor says that his work represents no one technology, but refers to modern technology as a whole.

== Awards and grants ==
In addition to the 1970 Tiffany Foundation grant that allowed him to study with Harvey Littleton, Taylor received a Danforth Foundation grant in 1971, a Thord–Gray Memorial Scholarship from the American-Scandinavian Foundation in 1973, a National Endowment for the Arts (N.E.A.) Fellowship in 1984 and a N.E.A. Forums Grant in 1985. In 1987 Taylor was presented with the New York Governor's Art Award; a fellowship from the New York Foundation for the Arts came in 1987 and a grant from the same institution was awarded in the following year. In 1998 a grant from the Samsung Corporation allowed Taylor to work at the Sung-Jin Glassworks in Kimpo.

== Personal ==
Michael Taylor has been married three times. The first marriage was to Jane Powell, a classmate at Middle Tennessee State University, in 1963. The couple had two sons: Michael Christopher Eric, born in 1966, and Nathaniel Saxon, born in 1970. Taylor's second marriage, in 1977, was to Patricia Allred, a political science graduate student at Vanderbilt University. That union produced a daughter, Austyn Hillary, in 1984. In 1992 Taylor married Deborah Haber of Rochester, New York.

Taylor underwent successful surgery in 1990 to remove a tumor from the left frontal lobe of his brain.

== Public collections ==
Michael Taylor's work in glass is included in the public collections of Carnegie Hall, New York, New York; Chrysler Museum of Art, Norfolk, Virginia; Corning Museum of Glass, Corning, New York; High Museum of Art, Atlanta, Georgia and the National Collection of American Art, Renwick Gallery, Smithsonian Institution, Washington, DC. Taylor's work can be found in the corporate collections of Bausch & Lomb, Rochester, New York; Coca-Cola, Atlanta, Georgia and Standard Oil, Chicago, Illinois, among others. Internationally his work can be found in the Düsseldorf Museum of Art, Germany; Glasmuseet Ebeltoft, Ebeltoft, Denmark and the Tokyo Glass Art Institute in Kawasaki-Shi, Japan.
