= Richard Ritter =

American studio glass artist (born 1940)

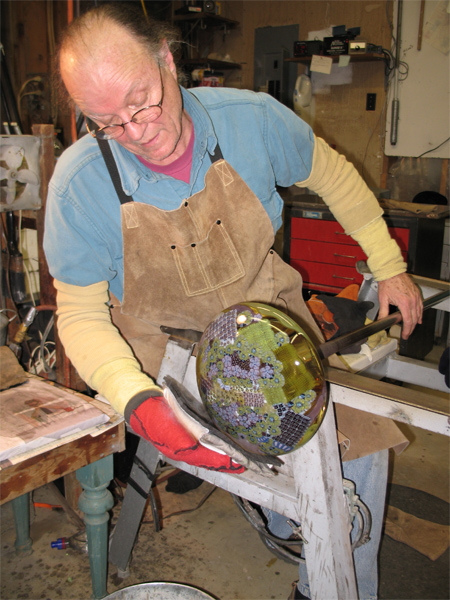
- Born: 1940 (age 85–86); Detroit, Michigan
- Occupations: Glass artist, teacher

Richard Ritter (born 1940) is an American studio glass artist who lives in North Carolina.

== Early life ==
Ritter was born in Detroit, but grew up in the then rural Michigan town of Novi. He was inspired to pursue a career in art by his high school art teacher and in 1959 on to study at the Society of Arts and Crafts (later renamed the Center for Creative Studies) in Detroit, Michigan. In 1962, Ritter left school to take a job with an advertising firm, returning in 1968 to the Society of Arts and Crafts to continue his studies and teach advertising there. His first experience with hot glass came in that year, when another instructor, Gilbert Johnson (b. 1930) built a glass workshop at the school. Ritter graduated from the Society of Arts and Crafts in 1969 and went to the Bloomfield Art Association in Birmingham, Michigan, to teach glassblowing. In 1971 he enrolled in a summer session class at Penland School of Crafts in North Carolina, where his instructor was glass artist Mark Peiser. Ritter soon afterward took a class with Richard Marquis. He then returned to the Penland school the following summer to teach, and in 1973 was named artist-in-residence at Penland School of Crafts, a position that he held until 1978. He continued to return to the school to teach and give workshops in subsequent years.

== Work ==
Ritter moved to Cass, Michigan in 1978. As a professional glass artist he was at this time making murrini vessels and paperweights. A commission from Joan Mondale, wife to then-Vice President Walter Mondale for dessert plates led Ritter to experiment with open platter forms containing murrini and lattacino.

In 1980, Ritter purchased a small farm near Bakersville, North Carolina where he built a studio. In the mid-1980s he began working on his “Triolet” series of large glass sculptures. In 1993 and 1994 he created the 26 art works of his “Grail” series; blown discs to which a faceted solid base was attached. These pieces often displayed etched and copper electroformed surface decoration. He produced 136 glass sculptures in his “Floral Core” series between the years 2002 and 2009; the artist’s "Mandala and Florescence" series was produced in the years 1997 through 2001.

== Exhibitions ==
Ritter has been honored with four retrospective exhibitions. In 2009, the fortieth anniversary of his career in glass art was celebrated by an exhibition of 75 works at Toe River Arts Council in Spruce Pine, North Carolina; the exhibition travelled to Western Carolina University in 2010. Lenders to the exhibition included Ritter's colleagues in North Carolina glass Harvey Littleton and Kate Vogel and John Littleton. Exhibitions of Ritter's work at Christian Brothers University in Memphis, Tennessee and at the University of Michigan, Dearborn celebrated the artist's thirtieth year in glass in 1990.

In 1993 the artist was one of 70 artists whose work was selected for “The White House Collection of Craft,” a traveling exhibition organized by the Smithsonian Institution. Other notable group exhibitions in which the artist’s work has been seen include shows at Western Carolina University in 1980, 1982, 1984, 1986; at Habatat Galleries in Michigan in 1981, 1983 1984 and in Habatat Galleries in Florida in 1992. In 1982 Ritter’s work was part of “Detroit Collects” at Detroit Institute of Arts, Detroit, Michigan; “Contemporary Blown Glass by Southeastern Artists at the Museum of Fine Arts, St. Petersburg, Florida and “World Glass Now ‘82” at the Hokkaidō Museum of Modern Art in Sapporo, Japan. His earliest international group exhibition was “American Glass Now” (1979) in Tokyo, Japan.

== Awards ==
Ritter was awarded an Honorary Doctor of Fine Arts from the Center for Creative Studies in Detroit, Michigan in 2000. He received a North Carolina Artist Fellowship Grant 2000-2001. In 1984 he received a National Endowment for the Arts Scholarship.

== Collections ==
Ritter’s work is in the permanent collections of the Asheville Art Museum (Asheville, North Carolina), High Museum of Art (Atlanta, Georgia), Mint Museum of Art (Charlotte, North Carolina), Hunter Museum of Art (Chattanooga, Tennessee), Corning Museum of Glass (Corning, New York), Detroit Institute of Art, Los Angeles County Museum of Art, Museum of Fine Arts, Boston, Renwick Gallery, Smithsonian American Art Museum (Washington, DC) and St. Louis Art Museum. Alfred Berkowitz Gallery (University of Michigan- Dearborn, Dearborn, Michigan)

== Personal ==
Richard Ritter has been married to glass artist Jan Williams since 1977.
