= Glen Alps =

- Born: June 20, 1914; Loveland, Colorado
- Died: November 3, 1996 (aged 82); Seattle, Washington
- Other names: Glen Earl Alps, Glen E. Alps
- Occupations: Artist, educator
- Known for: Developing the collagraph

Glen Alps (1914-1996) was a printmaker and educator who is credited with having developed the collagraph. A collagraph is a print whose plate is a board or other substrate onto which textured materials are glued. The plate may be inked for printing in either the intaglio or the relief manner and then printed onto paper. Although the inventor of the process is not known, Alps made collagraphy his primary art form and coined the word "collagraph" in 1956. He disseminated the techniques he developed for making collagraphs during his long career as both an artist and a teacher.

== Early life and education ==
Alps was born in 1914 on a farm near Loveland, Colorado. He attended Colorado State College of Education (today University of Northern Colorado) in Greeley, Colorado, where he received the Bachelor of Arts in 1940. After graduation he worked as an art instructor in the Greeley County school system until 1942, when he took a job in the publishing department of Culver Aircraft Factory in Wichita. In 1945 he returned to school at the University of Washington in Seattle, where he was awarded the Master of Fine Arts in 1947. During that summer Alps studied with printmaker Mauricio Lasansky (b. 1914) at the University of Iowa.

Alps's early work in printmaking was in keeping with the realism of American Regionalists Thomas Hart Benton and Grant Wood, but by the end of 1947 his work had turned toward abstraction and vivid color, judiciously used. The excitement of printmaking for Alps was in the creative process. He preferred small editions to large ones, and was prolific in his production. At this time he worked in lithography, screenprinting and etching. A favorite abstract motif was the circle in a square which, according to arts reviewer John Voorhees, became a type of "trademark" for the artist that he often used in his work.

== Teaching ==
Glen Alps began teaching in the Art Department of the University of Washington while he was still a graduate student there. In 1947 the chairman of the department, Walter F. Jacobs, invited Alps to teach classes in watercolor and design as an acting associate of the school. He soon began teaching printmaking, as well. After graduation Alps's teaching career at the University of Washington continued. He received tenure in 1954 and became a full professor in 1962. He was named Professor Emeritus upon his retirement from teaching in 1984.

Among his colleagues in the Art Department were the painters Jacob Lawrence (1917-2000), Wendell Brazeau (1910–1974), Boyer Gonzales (1909–1987), Alden Mason (b. 1919) and Spencer Moseley (1936–1998); modernist jewelry designer and craftsman, Ruth Pennington (1905–1998) and sculptor George Tsutakawa (1910–1997). Bill Ritchie (b. 1941), multimedia artist, also taught printmaking until 1984.

Alps's students include the printmaker and painter Barbara Bruch, printmaker, basket weaver and glass artist Joe Feddersen, printmaker Gerald Ferstman, the painters and collaborative sculptors Tom Northington and Mary Rothermel; assemblage and mosaic artist Glen Michaels (b. 1927), painter and sculptor James W. Washington, Jr. (1908-2002) and lithographer and abstract painter James Claussen. By many accounts Alps was an inspirational teacher. In a 1981 interview for the Smithsonian Archives of American Art (SAAM), Glen Michaels remembered Alps as "the one who opened my eyes to Op Art. His whole design concept was optical illusion, taking a flat surface and turning it into a sculptural thing. Experiments that he was doing that were so fertile and so exciting I’ve never seen anything like since."

== Development of the collagraph ==
Writers on the subject of collagraphy are careful to point out that while Glen Alps developed the artform and coined the term "collagraph" to describe it, he did not "invent" collagraphy. Elementary collagraphic techniques can be detected in prints dating from the 19th century, and the development in the early 20th century of collage as an art form led to the idea that objects (including bits of paper, fabric, metal and sand) collaged on to a printing plate could be inked and printed for textural effects. Artists who predated Alps in the use of this concept include the Norwegian Rolf Nesch and the Americans Boris Margo (1902–1995), Edmond Casarella (1920–1996) and Roland Ginzel (b. 1921). Alps began working in the technique in the fall of 1956, when he was an associate professor in the School of Art at the University of Washington. He was investigating art techniques that would stimulate creativity and, as he wrote, "...dramatically release the inner-most quality of being" of the artist. Alps shared the idea with his students at that time, and they became his colleagues in experimenting with the new art form. It became evident to Alps early on in his development of the process that he needed a name for it. The word that he coined,"collagraph", is a union of the words "collage" and "-graph." Artists who later created notable works in collagraphy include Dean Meeker (1920–2002), Edward Stasack (b. 1929), John Ross (1921 - 2017), Claire Romano (1922 - 2017) and Samuel Maitin (1928 - 2004). Alps, along with Romano and Ross were all members of Society of American Graphic Artists. Maitin (also a student of Mauricio Lasansky's in Philadelphia) formerly ran the Design Lab at the Annenberg School of Communications at the University of Pennsylvania and taught printmaking at the Print Club in Philadelphia.

== Dissemination of collagraphy ==
Alps was actively engaged in promoting as well as producing collagraphs. The first exhibition to show collagraphs by Alps and his students was a competitive print exhibition held in 1957 at the University of Washington's Henry Gallery. The first national exposure of a collagraph came in 1958, when Alps's "Chickens, Collagraph #12" was exhibited in the Brooklyn Museum's National Print Annual. In 1966 he demonstrated techniques used in making collagraphs in a 20-minute film titled "The Collagraph." Alps produced collagraphs throughout the remainder of his career. He exhibited his collagraphs widely, recognizing that their inclusion in national exhibitions helped to spread awareness of the art form. A respected professor of art, Alps personally taught collagraphy to hundreds of students during his tenure at the University of Washington.

== Practical and aesthetic concerns ==
Alps asserted that "...the first concern of the printmaker is the development of the plate, where the individuality of the artist has its chance to take form." For the collagraph's substrate Alps recommended inexpensive, readily-available construction materials, at that time plywood, Upsom board and Masonite. The collage materials were likewise cheap and easy to find, and included (but were not limited to) polymer glue, modeling paste, auto putty, plastic wood, ground walnut shells, wood shavings, brush bristles, string and assortments of paper, cardboard and cloth. These were "the essentials of image-making" through the collage technique. By dispensing with the metal plates and specialized plate-working tools of traditional intaglio printmaking, collagraphy allowed the artist "to approach the plate very spontaneously and directly or quite deliberately," as the artist's idea and working style dictated. For Alps, an artist's freedom depended on the ability to acknowledge "the potential of the moment" in expressing one's inner vision. The artist must be preoccupied not with the means of creation, but with ideas. Therefore, Alps said, collagraphy was the ideal technique for contemporary graphics because it allowed the artist to work spontaneously and to fully realize visual ideas in a relatively short time.

== Sculpture ==
Although Alps is remembered today as a printmaker, he was also a sculptor who created works for public display. These include Tall Shape created for the 1962 World's Fair; The Fountain of Waterfalls, installed in 1962 in front of the Seattle Municipal Building and Activity of Thought, installed in 1965 at the Magnolia Branch of The Seattle Public Library.

== Other projects ==
In 1960 Alps received a fellowship to the Tamarind Institute in New Mexico, where he created a group of lithographs. In the 1970s he originated the technique (which is no longer practiced) of pouring automotive lacquer over a Masonite plate and selectively burning away the lacquer with a jeweler's torch. The plate was then inked and printed. Alps used the technique in combination with collagraphy. In 1988 Alps was an artist-in-residence at Pilchuck Glass School. During this time he met glass artist Harvey Littleton, who introduced Alps to vitreography. Assisted by Littleton's printer at the time, David Wharton, Alps created a vitreograph titled "Pilchuck Summer."

Alps also designed and manufactured about thirty fine art printing presses. The Glen Alps Press was reputed to be durable, versatile and easy to operate.

== Works in public collections ==
Prints by Glen Alps can be found in the collections of the Bibliothèque Nationale [Paris], Art Institute of Chicago, Harvard University Art Museums, Library of Congress, Los Angeles County Museum of Art, Smithsonian American Art Museum, Loveland [Colorado] Museum/Gallery, Museum of Modern Art [New York], Portland Art Museum (Oregon), Seattle Art Museum, and Yale University Art Gallery, among many others.

== Personal ==
Glen Alps married Ruby Surber, a fellow student at Colorado State College of Education, in 1939. She preceded him in death in December, 1995. The couple had no children.
