= Gary Beecham =

American artist

- Born: April 21, 1955 (age 71); Ladysmith, Wisconsin
- Occupation: Glass artist

Gary Beecham is a studio glass artist of North Carolina.

== Education, work ==
Beecham's attended the University of Wisconsin–Madison, where he was awarded a Bachelor of Science in Art in 1979. He worked for a year in 1978 at the J. & L. Lobmeyr glassworks in Vienna, Austria before returning to the United States to settle in Spruce Pine, North Carolina. There he worked from 1980 to 1985 as an assistant to Harvey Littleton. Thereafter Beecham began his own career in glass, creating in the techniques of free-blowing, fusing and carving glass.

== Collections ==
Beecham's work has been collected by the Glasmuseet Ebeltoft, Ebeltoft, Denmark; Düsseldorf Art Museum in Ehrenhof, Düsseldorf; Frauenau Glass Museum, Germany; Asheville Art Museum, Asheville, North Carolina; High Museum of Art, Atlanta, Georgia and Mint Museum of Art, Charlotte, North Carolina.
