= Glasmuseet Ebeltoft =

Glass museum in Ebeltoft, Denmark

Glasmuseet Ebeltoft (Glasmuseum Ebeltoft, Ebeltoft Glass Museum)
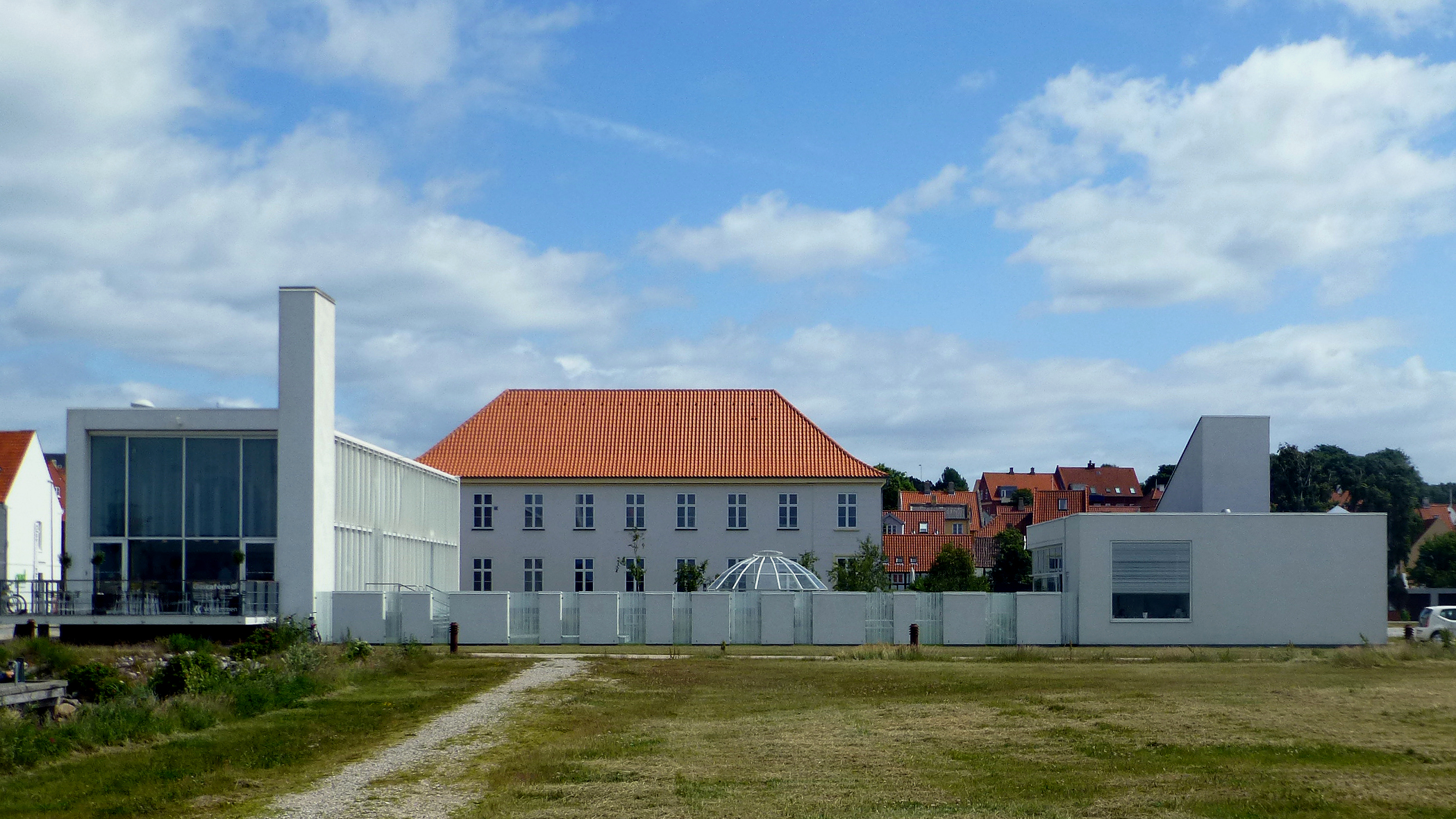
- Established: 1985
- Location: Strandvejen 8, 8400 Ebeltoft, Denmark
- Coordinates: 56.1972°N 10.6740°E
- Visitors: approx. 50,000 per year
- Website: glasmuseet.dk

Glasmuseet Ebeltoft is a museum in Ebeltoft, Denmark. It is dedicated to the exhibition and collection of contemporary glass art worldwide and also offers public demonstrations and seminars to glass students in its glass-blowing studio.

== Establishment ==
The museum was founded in 1985 by Danish glass artists Finn Lynggaard and Tchai Munch. It is administered by the private Foundation for the Collection of Contemporary International Studio Glass. The museum makes its home in Ebeltofts's former Customs and Excise House; in 2006 a modern wing was added to the original building. In addition to exhibition spaces, the museum has a library, gift shop and cafe that are open to the public. Also in 2006 an enclosed garden and glass-blowing studio were added to the complex. The glass studio presents glass working demonstrations to the public and seminars for students of glass.

Lynggaard (1930-2011), originally a ceramicist, had lectured in Sheridan College in Oakville, Ontario, where he encountered the studio glass movement. Studio glass—starting in the early 1960s—embraced glass as a medium for independent sculpture artists, in contrast to utilitarian or conventionally decorative glass work (typically produced by craftsmen to the specifications of a designer, as with companies such as Tiffany & Co.). “After raising the profile of glass in Gothenburg, London and elsewhere in Europe, in 1980 [Lynggaard] moved to Ebeltoft (‘Apple Hill’) – considered a ‘wilderness’ by some of his students – to set up a glassblowing studio.”

== Exhibitions ==
The museum presents four to six exhibitions per year that focus on contemporary glass art. It shows experimental work by young artists in group and solo shows, as well as new work by well-established artists. Organized by museum staff, the exhibitions often include catalogs that are printed in several languages for the benefit of an international audience. Glasmuseet Ebeltoft often loans the exhibitions it creates to museums in other countries. In the past these countries have included China, England, Finland, Germany and the United States.

== Collections ==
Glasmuseet Ebeltoft’s collection contains 1500 objects by 600 artists. Its holdings are composed of donations and loans of art works, obtained in most cases directly from the artists whose work is desired by the museum. The museum’s collection is most unusual in that artists who have been invited to be represented in it are permitted to exchange or supplement their works in the collection with new pieces.

Artists represented by work in the collection include Klaus Moje, Gerry King and Nick Mount of Australia; Paul Sanders of Australia; Louis Leloup of Belgium; Václav Ciglar, František Janák, Jiří Harcuba, Pavel Hlava, Stanislav Libenský and Jaroslava Brychtová and René Roubíček of the Czech Republic; Eva Engström, Finn Lynggaard and Tchai Munch of Denmark; Ivo Lill of Estonia; Erwin Eisch, Ursula Merker, Gerhard Ribka, Kurt Wallstab and Ann Wolff of Germany; Ursula Huber-Peer, Pino Signoretto, Bruno Pedrosa and Lino Tagliapietra of Italy; Durk Valkema and Sybren Valkema of the Netherlands; Anna Carlgren, Gunnar Cyrén, Eva Englund, Göran Wärff and Ulrica Hydman-Vallien of Sweden, Charles Bray and David Reekie of the United Kingdom; and Rick Beck, Gary Beecham, William Bernstein, Katharine Bernstein, Nicole Chesney, Dale Chihuly, Fritz Dreisbach, Shane Fero, Robert Fritz, Michael Glancy, Richard Jolley, Jon Kuhn, Marvin Lipofsky, Harvey Littleton, John Littleton/Kate Vogel, Dante Marioni, Richard Marquis, Joel Philip Myers, Mary Shaffer, Paul Stankard, Michael Taylor and Toots Zynsky of the United States.

== Sponsors ==
Because it receives no direct financial support from the Danish government, Glassmuseet Ebeltoft relies on sponsorships from Denmark's business community. The museum's three major sponsors are the textile company Kvadrat, Djursland Bank and NRGi energy company. Other corporate supporters include Primagaz, Montana Møbler, Blue Water Shipping, Cerama and Mois Linien.

Volunteer help is drawn from the museum's "Friends Society", which has about 900 members.
