= Robert C. Fritz =

American ceramics and glass artist and professor

Dr. Robert C. Fritz
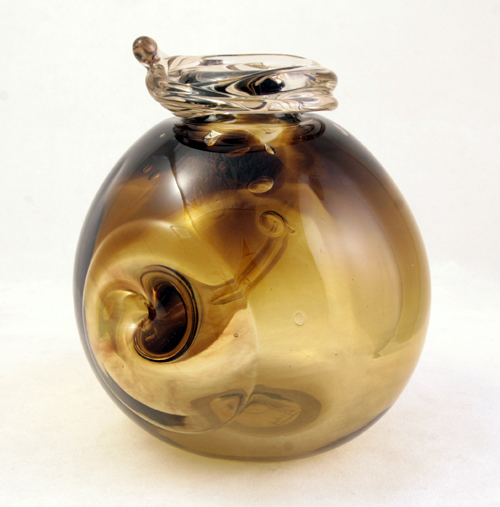
- Blown glass vase by Dr. Robert Fritz (1960s-1970s)
- Born: Robert Fritz; 1920; Toledo, Ohio, USA.
- Died: April 19, 1986 (aged 65–66); San Jose, California USA
- Education: Ohio State University, student of Harvey Littleton, San Jose State University.
- Known for: Glass art, Ceramic art Professor at SJSU
- Movement: American contemporary studio glass movement
- Patrons: Smithsonian, Renwick Gallery, Ted Kennedy, Tom Harkin, more

Robert C. Fritz (1920 in Toledo, Ohio – April 9, 1986 in Los Angeles, California) was an American ceramics and glass artist and professor at San Jose State University in California. As a major player in America’s mid 20th century studio glass movement, Dr. Robert Fritz is remembered for his contributions to the world of art.

== Education ==
Fritz attended San Jose State University from 1950 to 1956, where he was awarded the Bachelor of Arts and Master of Arts. He received his Ph.D at Ohio State University. In 1964 Fritz received a scholarship from Harvey Littleton to participate in a four-week glass seminar at the University of Wisconsin. Russell Day was also in attendance; Marvin Lipofsky, a student of Littleton's who later founded a glass program at the University of California, Berkeley, assisted with demonstrations. Shortly before the seminar, Fritz attended the World Congress of Craftsmen, which was held at Columbia University in New York City. There he watched Littleton and his students demonstrate glassblowing on a furnace designed and constructed by Dominick Labino. Fritz also met glass artist Sam Herman at this time. The 1960s studio glass movement was born in 1962 when Harvey Littleton conducted a workshop at the Toledo Museum of Art with Dominic Labino and others. It was Littleton’s intention to, as he put it, "suggest the dimensions of glass as a medium for the artist." In the summer of 1964 Littleton and his German colleague, Erwin Eisch, co-taught a glass course at the University of Wisconsin, Madison; Fritz was one of their students.

== Teaching ==
In the mid 1960s Fritz turned his energies to teaching art at San Jose State University where he founded the SJSU glass art department, one of the first colleges in the nation to have such a program. At the same time he started the California Glass Exchange, along with George Jercich of California Polytechnic State University in San Luis Obispo, CA.

== Legacy ==
Talented glass art students received scholarships and honors in Dr. Robert Fritz’s name. Many artists boast tutelage under Dr. Fritz on their resumes. Glass art created by Fritz during the 1960s to 1980s is signed “FRITZ”. His work is remarkable in form and imagination, using difficult techniques approachable only by masters of the art.

== Collections ==
His glass art masterpieces can be found in the Smithsonian, Renwick Gallery and the private collections of Ted Kennedy, Tom Harkin, Ron Wyden and more throughout the U.S., Europe, and Japan.
