= Ken Kerslake =

American printmaker and professor (1930–2007)

- Born: March 8, 1930; Mt. Vernon, New York
- Died: January 7, 2007 (aged 76); Gainesville, Florida
- Other names: Kenneth A. Kerslake, Ken A. Kerslake
- Occupations: Fine artist, educator

Ken Kerslake (1930–2007) was a printmaker and professor credited with being "one of a handful of printmaker-educators responsible for the growth of printmaking in the southeast in the years following World War II." Kerslake taught at the University of Florida in Gainesville, which gave him the title of Distinguished Service Professor Emeritus after his retirement.

He was born in Mount Vernon, New York. In 1958, Kerslake was hired by the University of Florida to develop a printmaking program for its art department. He went on to have a 38-year teaching career at the University of Florida. Kerslake was a founding member of the American Print Alliance and was active in the Southern Graphics Council, serving as that body's president from 1990 to 1992.

== Education ==
Kerslake started drawing as a small child and began to consider fine art as a career in high school. His formal study of art began in 1950 at Pratt Institute in New York City, where he was encouraged by teachers Philip Guston and Roger Crossgrove . With the latter's encouragement, Kerslake transferred to the University of Illinois in Champaign in 1953, where he received both the Bachelor and Master of Fine Arts. There, he discovered his medium when he took an intaglio printmaking course with Professor Lee Chesney, a mentor who was to become a lifelong friend. Kerslake enjoyed his first teaching experiences as a graduate assistant to Chesney. Soon, after receiving his master's degree in 1958, Kerslake accepted a faculty position with the School of Art and Art History at the University of Florida in Gainesville.

Intaglio printmaking was Kerslake's primary medium, but he also produced series of prints in lithography and vitreography. In the final years of his life, he also experimented in computer-generated imagery, creating ink jet prints that he used alongside more traditional techniques. He also painted throughout his career.

== Early work ==
His earliest prints, created between the mid-1950s to the early 1960s combined different intaglio techniques on the same plate. For example, his 1955 print, “Evolvement” (edition of 20) includes etching, engraving, soft ground, aquatint and flat biting to produce an abstract black and white composition of richly textured values of grays and black. In Kerslake's 1959 print “The Witnessed Image,” abstraction begins to give way to “interpenetrating organic forms with strong sexual overtones,” in the manner of Arshile Gorky's paintings, according to curator Larry David Perkins. In the early 1960s Kerslake's imagery became grotesquely figurative in prints such as “The Shape of Anxiety” of 1962 and “Anxiety Devouring Itself” of 1963, where the artist's inspiration sprang from such works as Kafka's story The Metamorphosis and Breughel's print Large Fish Eat Small Fish.

The artist's first foray into the medium of lithography was in the spring of 1964, when Kerslake based some lithographs on paintings that he had created in response to the November 22, 1963 assassination of President Kennedy. On a grant awarded by Tamarind Institute, Kerslake spent six weeks at the Herron Art Institute in Indianapolis creating the prints under the tutelage of master lithographer Garo Antreasian. Kerslake's prints "Altars of Man: Armageddon," "Altars of Man: The Glass Display Case" and "November 22" are part of this suite. His next major series, “Anatomy of the Star Spangled Man,” incorporated imagery from pop culture in five large prints created between 1967 and 1971. Once again working in the intaglio medium, Kerslake expanded his repertoire of techniques to include photo etching and embossing. He also added color to his standard etching techniques.

== Mid-career ==
While the work of the 1950s and ‘60s referred to large issues of contemporary culture and existential anxiety, Kerslake's works of the 1970s began to take on a more personal tone. Color and the use of photomechanical reproduction also take precedence in the prints of that decade. Kerslake credited his colleague Todd Walker, a professor in photography and printmaking at the University of Florida, with awakening his interest in the use of photo processes in printmaking. In “The Magic House of the Heart's Desire”, Kerslake combined images of a historic mansion located in his hometown of Mt. Vernon; twin images of his wife and children (located in rondels below the central image) and an all-seeing (protective) eye that hovers above all. The imagery conveys nostalgia, familial responsibilities in the present and a desire to secure the future. The artist's feeling for the language of longing culminates in his “Cecelia: The Artist's Mother as a Young Woman” created in the year following his mother's death. The print features a photo-etching of a smiling girl standing on a rocky plain as seagulls wheel overhead. According to Larry D. Perkins, former curator of collections at the Samuel P. Harn Museum of Art in Gainesville, Florida, the birds refer to “the transcendence of the spirit, while the receding rectangles that frame the portrait may suggest the passing of time or alternate states of existence.”

In 1982, Kerslake began a series of profiles of an old man with a bald head and a Roman nose with which he confronted human mortality. The series began with monotypes, to which intaglio techniques were gradually added. Sometimes the head is superimposed against a written background in which words are only occasionally legible, later words appear as legends under the profiles that refer to the old man's thought process or state of being.

== Late work ==
In the late 1980s, Kerslake spent the summer teaching with the University of Georgia's Summer Study Abroad Program in Cortona, Italy. In Cortona, he took in “the minutae and human relationships” of his surroundings, and was struck by the importance of the Italian piazza in people's social lives. Likening the piazza to a “large outdoor living room,” the artist enjoyed watching people gather there in the evening to discuss the day's events over coffee and wine. Upon returning to the United States Kerslake decided that the nearest thing to the piazza's relaxed social atmosphere could be found in his backyard patio. This insight inspired a series of paintings and prints whose subject matter, sun-struck arrangements of the patio furniture on the small square of concrete outside his house, occupied him for more than ten years. The artist wrote that the arrangements, from which the human figure was always absent) were meant to suggest that the empty chairs had been recently occupied by conversing friends, embracing lovers and the occasional lone dreamer. The works in this series also explore the abstract possibilities of the furniture's simple lines and the criss-crossing shadows thrown by it onto the glowing pavement. Related series focused on flower bouquets and trees in bright sunlight. These, according to the artist, are continuations of his interest "in the transforming quality of light [and] the play between solid object and ephemeral shadow." Kerslake's travels also inspired series bases on American tourists. They are depicted walking, relaxing or studying maps. These activities take place in what the artist called "undetermined spaces": "They are in fact figures searching for a connection, a sense of place, meaning and valid experience."

In 1990, Kerslake became interested in vitreography (editioned printmaking from glass matrices) when he was invited as an artist-in-residence to create in the technique at Littleton Studios in Spruce Pine, North Carolina. Over the next ten years he visited Littleton Studios six more times to create a total of twenty-five print editions using vitreograph and digital printmaking techniques. These prints furthered the exploration of both the patio and tourist series.

After 2000, Kerslake's imagery drew upon photographs of ancestors to contemplate his place on the continuum of his family history.

== Colleagues and students ==
Kerslake's colleagues at the University of Florida included photographers Jerry Uelsmann and Todd Walker, painters Hiram Williams and Lennie Kesl and sculptor Jack Nickelson. Uelsmann and Walker were particularly influential for Kerslake's art. The former introduced him to the artistic possibilities of photography and darkroom techniques, and the latter was a fellow researcher in photo-printmaking. Kerslake's notable students include painter John Caputo of Albany, New York; painter and photographer Robert W. Fichter of Fort Myers, painter and printmaker Michael Kemp of Gainesville, Florida and syndicated political cartoonist Ed Hall of Jacksonville, Florida.

== Collections ==
Ken Kerslake's work has been collected by numerous public institutions, including the Brooklyn Museum, Library of Congress, the National Gallery, Washington, DC; Yale University Art Gallery, New Haven, Connecticut; the High Museum of Art, Atlanta, Georgia and The Museum of Fine Arts, Boston, Massachusetts. His honors included a lifetime achievement award for Excellence in Printmaking Education from the Southern Graphics Council in 2004.

== Personal ==
Ken Kerslake married Sarah “Sally” Allen in 1956. They adopted two children: Scott Paul in 1963 and Katharine Rachel in 1964.
