= Mildred Thompson =

American artist (1936–2003)

- Born: Mildred Jean Thompson; March 12, 1936; Jacksonville, Florida, US
- Died: September 1, 2003 (aged 67); Atlanta, Georgia, US
- Occupations: Artist, educator, writer

Mildred Jean Thompson (March 12, 1936 – September 1, 2003) was an American artist who worked in painting, drawing, printmaking, sculpture and photography. Critics have related her art to West African textiles and Islamic architecture; they have also cited German Expressionism, music (both American jazz and classical European) and Thompson's readings in astronomy, spiritualism and metaphysics as important artistic influences. She also wrote and was an associate editor for the magazine Art Papers.

Thompson had solo exhibitions at the Goethe-Institut, Agnes Scott College, Howard University, Harvard University, Museum of Contemporary Art Jacksonville, and the Leopold Hoesch Museum, Düren and Hochschule für Kunst und Design in Halle, Germany, among others. Posthumously, her work was part of the 2017 exhibition "Magnetic Fields: Expanding American Abstraction," at Kemper Museum of Contemporary Art, in Kansas City, Missouri. In addition to those at her gallery Galerie Lelong in New York City, there were solo exhibitions of her work at the New Orleans Museum of Art and the Berlin Biennale in 2018 and Spelman College Museum of Fine Art in 2019.

== Early life, education, and career ==
Mildred Jean Thompson was born on March 12, 1936, in Jacksonville, Florida and grew up there. Her formal art training began in 1953 when she entered Howard University in Washington, D.C., where she was mentored under James A. Porter (1905–1970), the head of the school's art department. He arranged for Thompson to receive a scholarship for summer study at the Skowhegan School of Painting and Sculpture in Maine. After Thompson received the Bachelor of Arts from Howard in 1957, Porter assisted her in entering the Brooklyn Museum of Art School on a Max Beckmann Scholarship. She began to exhibit, and her work was accepted for the Art U.S.A. '58 exhibition in Madison Square Garden.

=== Study in Europe ===
After being rejected from a Fulbright Scholarship to Europe, Thompson decided to go there on her own. She worked to save money during the rest of the school year and, through the auspices of Samella Lewis (1924–2022), got a summer job teaching ceramics at Florida A&M University in Tallahassee earning enough for steamship passage to Europe.

Thompson's trip to Germany was attended by good fortune: She had decided to study at the Art Academy of Hamburg (Hochschule für bildende Künste Hamburg) even though, at the time she arrived, she had not yet applied or been accepted. Nor did she have any plans as to where she would live. A few private lessons were all she had to prepare herself for the German language. Nevertheless, armed with pluck, a strong portfolio, and the help of some brand-new German friends, Thompson found a room and was immediately accepted into the academy. There her painting teachers were Walter Arno (1930–2005) and Emil Schumacher (1912–1999). She learned etching, lithography and other printmaking media from Willem Grimm (1904–1986) and Paul Wunderlich (1927–2010). She also met the printmaker Horst Janssen (1929–1995), who introduced her to Galerie Sander in Hamburg, where Thompson had her first solo exhibition. At the end of her first year she received a scholarship that paid for her living and school expenses.

== Career ==
After three years at the academy, in early 1961, Thompson returned to New York City to begin her professional career in the United States. The social and artistic acceptance she had enjoyed in Europe, however, was not to be found even in that most cosmopolitan of American cities. Thompson soon realized that because she was a black woman, she was refused the shows and gallery representation that she felt her work deserved. In a 1977 autobiographical essay, Thompson wrote that "One woman dealer... said that it would be impossible for me to have a show in New York as an artist. [Another gallery owner said] ...that it would be better if I had a white friend to take my work around, someone to pass as Mildred Thompson." She did, however, gain an audience with William Lieberman, the son of German Expressionist painter Max Liebermann; Lieberman (1923–2005) was an influential curator at the Museum of Modern Art. Two of Thompson's prints were purchased for the collection on his recommendation.

In the fall of 1961 and again in 1962, Thompson received fellowships to the MacDowell Colony in New Hampshire, where she worked on drawings and paintings. In 1963 she returned to Germany to live, partly because she could find no sales outlet for her work, and partly because of growing racial tension in the United States. She was not alone; other young black artists who chose to leave the U.S. during the 1950s and 1960s include Harvey Cropper, Herbert Gentry, Arthur Hardie, Clifford Jackson, Sam Middleton, Earl Miller, Norma Morgan, Larry Potter and Walter Williams. In the words of artist David Driskell, "They chose a form of cultural exile over expatriation, hoping for a better day to come about in the land of their birth." All settled in Europe. Thompson established herself in the Rhineland town of Düren and once again began exhibiting and selling her work there and in the German cities of Bensberg, Aachen, and Cologne.

Thompson's work in the 1960s was figurative, but in the early 1970s she moved toward total abstraction. In Europe her works reflected the formal ideas of art for art's sake, and did not respond to the politicized art of the Black and women's movements in the United States. According to writer Alexis De Veaux, "Thompson thought of herself as an expatriate and did not separate her identity as black from her identity as American" although she eventually disavowed "any claim to being American."

Years later Thompson defended herself against the charge that because of her years spent in Europe, she was not a true "Black" artist. In a 1987 essay for SAGE magazine she wrote:

On certain levels, perhaps we [black Americans] might be able to identify with certain parts of certain African cultures. To copy symbols that one does not understand, to deliberately make use of a form that one does not know how to analyze or appreciate was for me the height of prostitution. I had spent long years trying to find out who I am and what my influences were and where they came from. It was perhaps because I had lived and studied with "whitey" that I had learned to appreciate my Blackness as well as how American I truly am. My experiences throughout Africa had made my knowledge of being an American more than clear. There are recordings in our genes that remember Africa. If they are strong enough and we are free of false denials, they will surface and appear without deliberation no matter what we do.

After ten years in Germany (during which she traveled to southern Europe and Africa), in 1975, Thompson returned to the U.S. She found that the social climate had improved somewhat and was able to overcome many of the obstacles she previously encountered. While her work was included in Art Expo '75 at the Tate Galleries in London, she herself lived at first in Florida, where she was named artist-in-residence of the City of Tampa under the support of the National Endowment for the Arts. In 1977, she moved to Washington, D.C., where she was Artist-in-Residence at Howard University for the 1977–78 academic year and presented a solo show there and at Harvard University. Thompson met writer Audre Lorde in Nigeria in 1977, and the two were briefly romantically involved while Thompson lived in Washington, D.C.

After garnering Washington Bar Association's first-ever Artist of the Year award in 1978, Thompson returned to Europe in 1979, this time to Paris, where she opened a studio in the Rue de Parme. That year she exhibited in the group shows "Impressions/Expressions: Black American Graphics" at the Studio Museum in Harlem, "Cross Pollination" at the Los Angeles Women's Building, and in "American Drawings II," at the Smithsonian Institution, Washington, D.C. In 1982, her work was included in "Forever Free: Art by African-American Women 1862–1980," at the Center for the Visual Arts Gallery at Illinois State University in Normal, Illinois.

Thompson moved to Atlanta in 1986, which became "home base" for the remainder of her life. There she taught art and art history in several area colleges, including the Atlanta College of Art. A talented writer and interviewer, she also joined the staff of the periodical Art Papers in 1987, the same year she presented a solo exhibition at the Goethe-Institute Atlanta. She also wrote poetry which she would occasionally present with her artwork.

In 1990, Thompson had a solo exhibition entitled "Concatenation," at Agnes Scott College's Dalton Gallery in Atlanta. Two years later, she presented a solo show of paintings, prints, and sculpture at Brenau College in Gainesville, Georgia, and in 1994 she had solo exhibitions at Auburn University, in Auburn, Alabama, and at the Hochschule für Kunst & Design in Halle, Germany. In 1995, she had a solo show at the Kenkelaba House in New York City, and the next year had a solo exhibition of her prints and drawings at Rolling Stone Press in Atlanta.

Thompson was given a solo exhibition in her hometown at the Museum of Contemporary Art in Jacksonville, Florida, in 1997. The curator, Henry Flood Roberts Jr., said "People were knocked out by Mildred's large and colorful canvases and a roomful of her bird-like sculptures." Two years later, she had a solo show at Georgia Perimeter College in Atlanta.

Thompson died of cancer on September 1, 2003.

=== Posthumous exhibitions ===
In 2009, Leopold Hoesch Museum and Schloss Burgau, in Düren, Germany, where she lived, presented a retrospective of her work entitled, "Mildred Thompson: A Life Long Exploration." The next year, Galerie l'Aquarium in Valenciennes, France, exhibited her Wood Pictures and the Tubman African American Museum in Macon, Georgia, "Making the Invisible Visible: Photographs and Works on Paper by Mildred Thompson." In 2015, Michael C. Carlos Museum of Art in Atlanta exhibited a solo show of her prints.

In 2016, SCAD Museum of Art in Atlanta presented a solo exhibition "Mildred Thompson: Resonance." Her work was part of the 2017 exhibition "Magnetic Fields: Expanding American Abstraction," the following year at Kemper Museum of Contemporary Art, in Kansas City, Missouri. In 2018, Galerie Lelong in New York City started to represent her estate, presenting a solo exhibition, "Mildred Thompson: Radiation Explorations and Magnetic Fields."

There were two other solo exhibitions of her work at the New Orleans Museum of Art and the Berlin Biennale in 2018. In 2019, the Spelman College Museum of Fine Art in Atlanta showed "Mildred Thompson: The Atlanta Years, 1986–2003."

Thompson's New York gallery presented their second solo exhibition of her work in 2021 focusing on her assemblages and works on paper from the 1960s to the 1990s entitled "Throughlines." The same year Western Carolina University in Cullowhee, North Carolina, showed a solo exhibition of her work entitled "Helio Centric." Her latest solo exhibition was at New Britain Museum of American Art in New Britain, Connecticut, in 2022.

From May 10–October 12, 2025, The Institute of Contemporary Art Miami presented “Mildred Thompson: Frequencies.”

Beyond solo exhibitions, Thompson's work, "Zylo-Probe," was featured in the Johnson Museum of Art's 50th anniversary at Cornell University from March 17, 2023, to March 10, 2024.

== Influences in Thompson's mature work ==
In 1987 Thompson's show "In and Out of Germany," at the Goethe Institute in Atlanta, contained 42 artworks executed in Germany, France, and the United States. The Atlanta newsweekly Creative Loafing mentioned Thompson's most recent series of colored pencil drawings, Objective Music, were based on her correlation of art with music. It also made reference to her sense of color and rhythmic line-making as influenced by Wassily Kandinsky. Another contemporary review of the exhibition in Art Papers also mentioned Kandinsky as an influence, as well as Thompson's interest in the fiction of Hermann Hesse and the Jungian concept of the collective unconscious. But Thompson's feeling for music seemed to have the strongest effect on the work in the exhibition. The reviewer, Leslie Schworm, wrote that Thompson's "approach is to draw music or sound. She believes that patterns in music are among the purest natural recurrences, providing direct access to something basic."

Magnetic Fields (1990) at the National Museum of Women in the Arts in 2023

In the following year the visual description of music was still on Thompson's mind. A solo exhibition titled "Concatenation'" at Agnes Scott College in Decatur, Georgia, contained the wooden sculpture Mass, whose six parts were named Kyrie, Gloria, Credo, Sanctus, Benedictus, and Gloria Dei. But other influences, including astronomy, spiritualism and metaphysics were starting to appear in her work. Included in "Concatenations" was a series of prints titled Five Mysteries. Their abstract compositions, printed in black ink on paper, were schematic representations of earth, atmosphere and the sun, the latter a flat disc set in a sky filled with energetic marks and scratches. Thompson's series of watercolors, titled Lemurian Wanderings, were described by critic Lorena Gay-Griffin as "...the time at the dawn of the world before the first ray of sun shone through the atmosphere." A series of colored pencil drawings, The Phases of Cynthia, was reported by the writer to refer to Galileo's study of the phases of the moon. The drawings featured "the same sun/moon image as the prints. The circles are layered with other geometric shapes and surrounded by fragments and rays emitting from the center." In 1990 Thompson told Essence magazine: "My work has to do with the cosmos and how it affects us." Such references continued in her printmaking. In 1993, as an artist-in-residence at Littleton Studios in North Carolina, Thompson created prints in vitreography titled Helio Centric, Particles, and Wave Function.

A 1992 group exhibition entitled A/Cross Currents: Synthesis in African American Abstract Painting featured a catalog that cited the jazz of Eric Dolphy, Charles Mingus and Thelonious Monk and the German baroque of Bach as influences on Thompson's art. The catalog's essayist, Corrine Jennings, wrote: "The idea that man and certain animals can hear the sounds of eleven or twelve octaves, but can only see one octave of seven colors, has led to [Thompson's] interest in exploring the unseen and making it visible." The Magnetic Fields series of paintings that Thompson exhibited in the show, Jennings wrote, "appear to visualize the force of unseen energy. They are intensely painted, tersely defined geometric structures with a direct physical application loosened by...improvisation."

== Teaching ==
Thompson had a long and varied teaching career. From 1961 to 1964, as she was making her way as an artist in New York City, she taught elementary school for the New York City Board of Education. In Düren, Germany, she taught art and art history at the Eschweiler Volchoch Schule from 1965 to 1974.

On being named Artist-in-Residence for the City of Tampa, Thompson taught classes and workshops in painting, drawing, sculpture, and mural painting to adults and children at the Tampa Bay Art Center and other local venues. She also had an "open door" policy at her studio on 7th Avenue in Ybor City. There, she wrote: "...anyone who wanted to come in and see could walk in. I felt it somehow served the community." As an Artist-in-Residence at Howard University she taught etching. When she lived in Paris, Thompson gave private lessons at her studio at 4 Rue de Parme from 1981 until her return to the States in 1985. From 1986 to 1989 she taught studio classes, art history and art theory at Agnes Scott College in Decatur, Georgia, and in Atlanta she taught at Morehouse College and Spelman College. From 1986 to 2000 Thompson taught at the Atlanta College of Art.

== Personal life ==
Thompson had a sister, Ruth, and a partner, Donna Jackson. In her years in Atlanta, she was known for her purple Afro.

She sang and played guitar in a band called We Do Blues, which Jackson was also in, which played regularly at Daddy D'Z, a barbecue place, and during lunch hours at Woodruff Park. "Mildred favored what I'd call 'happy blues' – none of that 'My Baby Done Left Me' stuff," said band member Kerry Davis. "She wrote uplifting songs like 'A Peacock in the Ghetto,' which is a favorite of mine. Her songs were flavored with humor and beauty but still had a bluesy sound."

== Public collections and gallery representation ==
Thompson's work is in the permanent collections of the Smithsonian American Art Museum, National Museum of Women in the Arts, and Howard University, all in Washington, D.C., the Museum of Modern Art, the Brooklyn Museum; the Mott-Warsh Collection, the Birmingham Museum of Art, the Georgia Museum of Art, the Johnson Museum of Art at Cornell University, Museum of Fine Arts, Houston, Emory University, and the Leopold Hoesch Museum, Düren, and the Hamburg Museum, among others.

She is posthumously represented by Galerie Lelong in New York City and has an estate established under her name.
