= Bill Boysen =

American glass artist (1936–2020)

Bill Boysen (January 23, 1936 – April 28, 2020) was an American artist, specializing in the use of glass to produce three-dimensional artworks.

== Early life and education ==
Bill Boysen was born on January 23, 1936, the son of Emil and Erna Boysen of Foster, Washington.

Both Boysen and glass artist Dale Chihuly studied under Harvey Littleton at the University of Wisconsin. Littleton and Dominick Labino are widely credited with co-founding the studio glass movement in 1962 when they demonstrated glassblowing using "a small-scale glass furnace at the Toledo Museum of Art in Toledo, Ohio."

== Career ==
In 1965, when Bill Brown was the director at the well-known Penland School of Crafts, he asked Boysen, then professor emeritus at Southern Illinois University Carbondale, to set up a glass studio at the facility and offer courses during their summer term. This early enthusiasm for studio glass led Penland "to become the site of the founding of the Glass Art Society in the early 1970s."

Boysen traveled to Australia in 1974, where he promoted glass artistry by presenting a "revolutionary demonstration of glass blowing" to a gathering of around 250 attendees. Boysen's mobile studio toured eight eastern states' venues in 1974. Boysen's visit is credited with helping "inspire a generation of [Australian] artists to work with glass, and eventually led to the creation of the National Art Glass Collection" in Wagga Wagga, Australia. This important collection includes over 450 works of art and is "the most comprehensive public collection of Australian studio glass anywhere."

Boysen started the glassblowing program at SIUC's School of Art and Design in 1966, developing the curriculum and recruiting students and future artists. For decades, Boysen travelled the United States with students using a mobile studio to demonstrate glass blowing techniques to crowds at art fairs and other venues. While representing the glass program at Southern Illinois University at Carbondale, Boysen viewed these demonstrations as a way of "spreading the gospel of glass".

Students in the program named the original mobile studio "Aunt Gladys," and it remained one of only a few mobile glassblowing studios in the country until it was replaced by "Aunt Gladys 2" in the early 2000s. In an interview, Boysen explains the name, "We thought (the vehicle's) character was more like an aunt in the family that might come over on the weekend, bring some exciting stories, teach some new ideas and then in the blink of an eye, she's gone again. We thought of a name that was close to glass, and Gladys was as close as we came for a female name." Boysen designed and constructed the mobile glassblowing studio in 1969, and "Aunt Gladys" made "its first public out-of-state demonstration in 1972 at Spring Arbor College, Michigan."

== Exhibitions ==
Boysen's work has been widely exhibited, including showings at the Executive Mansion in Springfield, Illinois.

== Death ==
Boysen died on April 28, 2020, survived by his wife, Marilyn, son Trent Boysen, and daughter Kendall Boysen.
