= František Janák =

Czech glass artist

František Janák (born 1 June 1951) is a Czech glass artist. He creates glass sculptures and commission works, and also does series production design for different Czech glassworks.

== Biography ==
Janák was born on 1 June 1951 in Havlíčkův Brod, Czechoslovakia. He completed his apprenticeship in glass cutting at the Bohemia Glassworks, Czech's biggest producer of hand cut lead crystal. He followed with studies at the Secondary School of Glassmaking in Kamenický Šenov. From 1971 to 1972 he was head master at the Bohemia Glassworks school, followed by three years as a glass cutter at the Co-op Výtvarná řemesla in Prague. From 1975 to 1981 Janák studied at the Academy of Applied Arts in Prague under Prof. Stanislav Libenský.

In 1981, Janák opened his own studio in Dolní Město. From 1985 to 1988 he was a glass designer at the Institute of Interior and Fashion Design – ÚBOK Prague. From 1989 to 1993 he was again a free-lance glass artist at his own studio, this time in Prague. From 1993 to 1995 he was a glass designer at the LINEA-ÚBOK in Prague.

From 1995 to 1997 Janák was a visiting professor at the Toyama Institute of Glass Art in Toyama (TIGA), Japan. In 1997, he returned to his studio in Prague. In 1998, he was appointed Professor at the Secondary School of Glassmaking in Kamenický Šenov. In 2000–01, he was visiting assistant professor at the Rochester Institute of Technology, Rochester, New York, United States.

Since 2003, Janák has been a professor at the Secondary School of Glassmaking in Kamenický Šenov and is leader of the school's section of glass cutting.

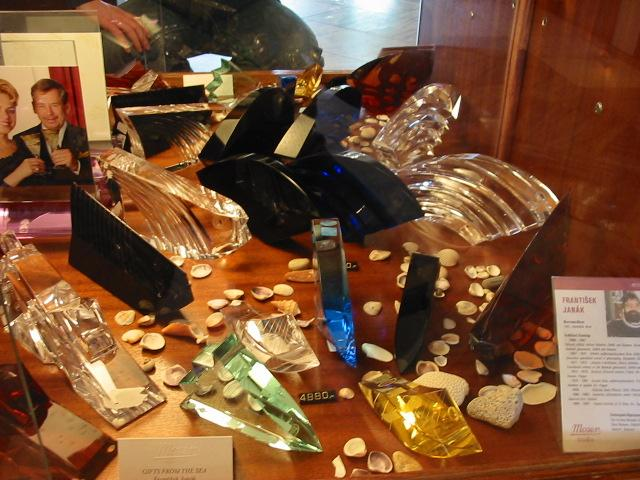
Examples of work in the Moser glass factory in Karlovy Vary

His art is included in museums throughout the world, including Glasmuseet Ebeltoft, Denmark; Ulster Museum, Belfast, Northern Ireland; Finnish Glass Museum, Riihimäki, Finland; Rippl Ronai Museum, Kaposvár, Hungary; Museum of Modern Art, Düsseldorf, Germany; the collection of the city Toyama, Japan; and Museum of Glass, Tacoma, Washington, United States.

His commissioned works include:

- Three stained glass windows, church in Svatobořice-Mistřín, Czech Republic (1986).
- Stained glass windows and mobile fountain, Agrobank Pardubice, Czech Republic (1993).
- Waterfall (glass object), Hotel Orfeus, Poděbrady, Czech Republic (1995).
- Messenger (glass object), Aubade hall, Toyama, Japan (1996).

== Awards ==
- 1981 - Rector prize at the Academy of Applied Arts in Prague
- 1982 - Urkunde Jugend gestaltet in Munich, Germany
- 1985 - Special prize at the Second Coburger glass prize in Coburg, Germany
- 1986 - First prize at the 4th Quadrennial in Erfurt, Germany
- 1988 - Diploma at the exhibition of WCC-Europe in Stuttgart, Germany
- 1995 - Pavel Hlava prize at the International Exhibition of Glass in Kanazawa, Japan
- 2000 - Honorable mention at the exhibition Millennium glass in Mostly Glass, United States

Janák also received several prizes for industrial design in the Czech Republic.
