= Therman Statom =

American Studio Glass artist (born 1953)

- Born: 1953 (age 72–73); Winter Haven, Florida
- Occupation: Artist
- Known for: Glass sculpture

Therman Statom is an American Studio Glass artist whose primary medium is sheet glass. He cuts, paints, and assembles the glass - adding found glass objects along the way – to create three-dimensional sculptures. Many of these works are large in scale. Statom is known for his site-specific installations in which his glass structures dwarf the visitor. Sound and projected digital imagery are also features of the environmental works.

== Early life and education ==
The son of a physician, Therman Statom was born in Winter Haven, Florida in 1953 and raised in Washington, DC. There he developed a friendship with Cady Noland, the daughter of abstract painter Kenneth Noland. In childhood Statom is reported to have told the elder Noland (who was working on his target series at the time), “I can paint like that too.” Statom attributes his early desire to be an artist to Kenneth Noland. He began his study of glass as an art medium at Pilchuck Glass School in Stanwood, Washington in 1971, going on to study sculpture at Rhode Island School of Design. He received the Bachelor of Arts from that institution in 1974 and the Master of Arts from Pratt Institute School of Art and Design in 1978. At Pratt he made his first works with sheet glass (which, in the glass industry, is called float glass) because the school was not equipped for hot glass working. In the early 1980s, Statom received an invitation from Richard Marquis to visit the hot glass program that he directed at the University of California at Los Angeles. When Marquis left the program in 1983 Statom headed it until its closure in 1985.

== Exhibitions ==
His twenty-five year professional career includes exhibitions at major museums across the United States. Recent one-person exhibitions include those at the Lowe Museum of the University of Miami, Coral Gables, Florida; Chrysler Museum of Art in Norfolk, Virginia and Toledo Museum of Art in Toledo, Ohio. Internationally Statom has exhibited in Stockholm, Sweden; Paris, France; Hokkaido, Japan and Ensenada, Mexico.

== Public commissions ==
Among Statom's public commissions are throughout the United States.

- Chandeliers / Natural, Technological, Ethereal, Central Library, Los Angeles, California
- untitled, Tom Bradley Terminal, Los Angeles International Airport, Los Angeles, California
- Ice Center, San Jose, California
- commissioned work, Harrah's Casino, Las Vegas, Nevada
- commissioned work, Scottsdale Museum of Contemporary Art, Scottsdale, Arizona
- commissioned work, New York State Arts Commission, New York

== Honors and awards ==
Therman Statom includes among his honors an Outstanding Achievement Award presented in 2008 by UrbanGlass, and a Distinguished Artist Award presented in 2006 by the James Renwick Alliance in Washington, DC. Statom was awarded fellowship grants by the National Endowment for the Arts in 1988 and 1982; he was the recipient of a Ford Foundation Artists Grant in 1997. Statom was made a Fellow of the American Craft Council in 1999. In November, 2015, Statom was named a United States Artists Fellow, which includes an unrestricted $50,000 award. The organization seeks to identify "accomplished and innovative artists working in the fields of architecture and design, crafts, dance, literature, media, music, theater and performance, traditional arts and visual arts."

== Work in public collections ==
In the United States, public collections holding Therman Statom's work include: the Metropolitan Community College-Elkhorn Valley Campus, Omaha, Nebraska; Art Museum of West Virginia University, Morgantown, West Virginia; California African-American Museum, Los Angeles, California; Cincinnati Art Museum; City of Seattle, Seattle, Washington; Corning Museum of Glass, Corning, New York; Detroit Institute of Arts, Detroit, Michigan; High Museum of Art, Atlanta, Georgia; Los Angeles County Museum of Art, Los Angeles, California; Milwaukee Art Museum; Mint Museum of Craft + Design, Charlotte, North Carolina; National Afro-American Museum and Cultural Center, Columbus, Ohio; Renwick Gallery of the Smithsonian's American Art Museum, Washington D.C.; Vero Beach Museum of Art, and Skirball Cultural Center, Los Angeles, California. Overseas Statom's work can be found in the collections of the Musée des Arts Décoratifs, Paris, France; Museum of Contemporary Design and Applied Arts in Lausanne, Switzerland; and in Moscow, Russia and Maputo, Mozambique through the Art in Embassies program of the U.S. Department of State.
