= Finn Lynggaard =

Danish artist

Finn Lynggaard (1930-2011) was a Danish artist known for his co-founding of Glasmuseet Ebeltoft and his work as a pioneer of Danish glass art.

== Biography ==
Lynggaard was born in Balling, Denmark, 1930, he graduated from the Royal College of Art in Copenhagen; there, he studied ceramics and painting. Early in his career, he began as a painter, but he quickly shifted his focus to ceramics, with him writing a book on the Raku technique. Then, in 1970, on a trip to Toronto, where he gave a lecture on ceramics for Sheridan College, he was convinced by a friend to try experimenting with hot glass. Immediately, he became enthralled and began his career as a glass artist. He then moved to London, where he encouraged others to become glass artists and improved the reputation associated with the form of art throughout Europe. At the beginning of the 1980s, at a symposium in Vienna, Lynggaard suggested for a museum to be established in Ebeltoft, where he had moved to in 1980 and had set up a glass studio. Acting on his wish, in 1986, he co-founded Glasmuseet Ebeltoft with his wife, Tchai Munch. The museum opened its doors on June 8, 1986, and in 2008, the museum expanded and added a new wing. In January 2010, Glasmuseet Ebeltoft hosted the "Status 80" exhibition which celebrated Lynggaard's 80th birthday by exhibiting some of his works from throughout his life, including ceramics and paintings. On August 25, 2011, Lynggard passed away. His works are still shown in galleries throughout the world.
