= Richard Marquis =

American studio glass artist

- Born: September 17, 1945 (age 80); Bumble Bee, Arizona
- Education: B.A., M.A., University of California, Berkeley
- Known for: glass: murrine forms, notably teapots
- Website: www.richardmarquis.com

Richard "Dick" Marquis (born 1945) is an American studio glass artist. One of the first Americans ever to work in a Venetian glass factory, he became a master of Venetian cane and murrine techniques. He is considered a pioneer of American contemporary glass art, and is noted for his quirky, playful work that incorporates flawless technique and underlying seriousness about form and color.

'American Acid Capsule with Cloth Container', glass and cloth by Richard Marquis, 1969-1970,Metropolitan Museum of Art

== Early life and education ==
Richard Marquis was born on September 17, 1945, in Bumble Bee, Arizona, the second son of an itinerant grocery-store worker and a ceramics-hobbying mother. Marquis and his older brother were the first persons in his parents' families to finish high school, and he was the first to attend college. As a child he began a life-long absorption with collecting found and scavenged objects in categories (cigar bands, bottle caps), though the collections disappeared each time the family moved. He also engaged in building hobby models.

Because of disagreements with his father, Marquis left home at fifteen, though he remained in his Southern California high school, where he developed an interest in ceramics. In 1963 he moved to the San Francisco area and began architecture studies at the University of California, Berkeley. He became more and more interested in ceramics, studying with Peter Voulkos and Ron Nagle. His quirky style was influenced by the funky environment surrounding Voulkos and the other Berkeley ceramicists of the time. After Marvin Lipofsky began a glass program at Berkeley in 1964, Marquis was attracted to glass, and by 1967 he had established his own studio. He earned his BA degree at Berkeley in 1969.

In 1969, Marquis was awarded a Fulbright-Hays fellowship to work on Murano, in Venice, Italy. Given the title of guest designer in the Venini factory, he worked his way through the glassblowing line, watching the masters, making drawings, and then doing it himself. As he mastered the murrine techniques, Marquis realized he could use them to make objects with colorful patterns, and even to embed lettered words in blown objects. Many of his early objects, inspired by his Berkeley free-speech-movement days, were shaped like oversized recreational drug capsules, and included American flags, hammer-and-sickle symbols, and four-letter f-bombs.

Returning to the US in 1970, Marquis taught for a year at the University of Washington, then returned to Berkeley to earn his M.A. in glass in 1972. His thesis was on the making of murrine and their use, and for his exhibition he made two canes that could be cut into murrine: one of the American flag, and the second a remarkable and complex word-cane of the entire Lord's Prayer. Murrine cane can be stretched out to any desired diameter, so that the wording in the prayer can be easily readable, or reduced to the size of a pinhead. For several years, Marquis included Lord's Prayer murrine of various sizes in his work.

== Career and work ==
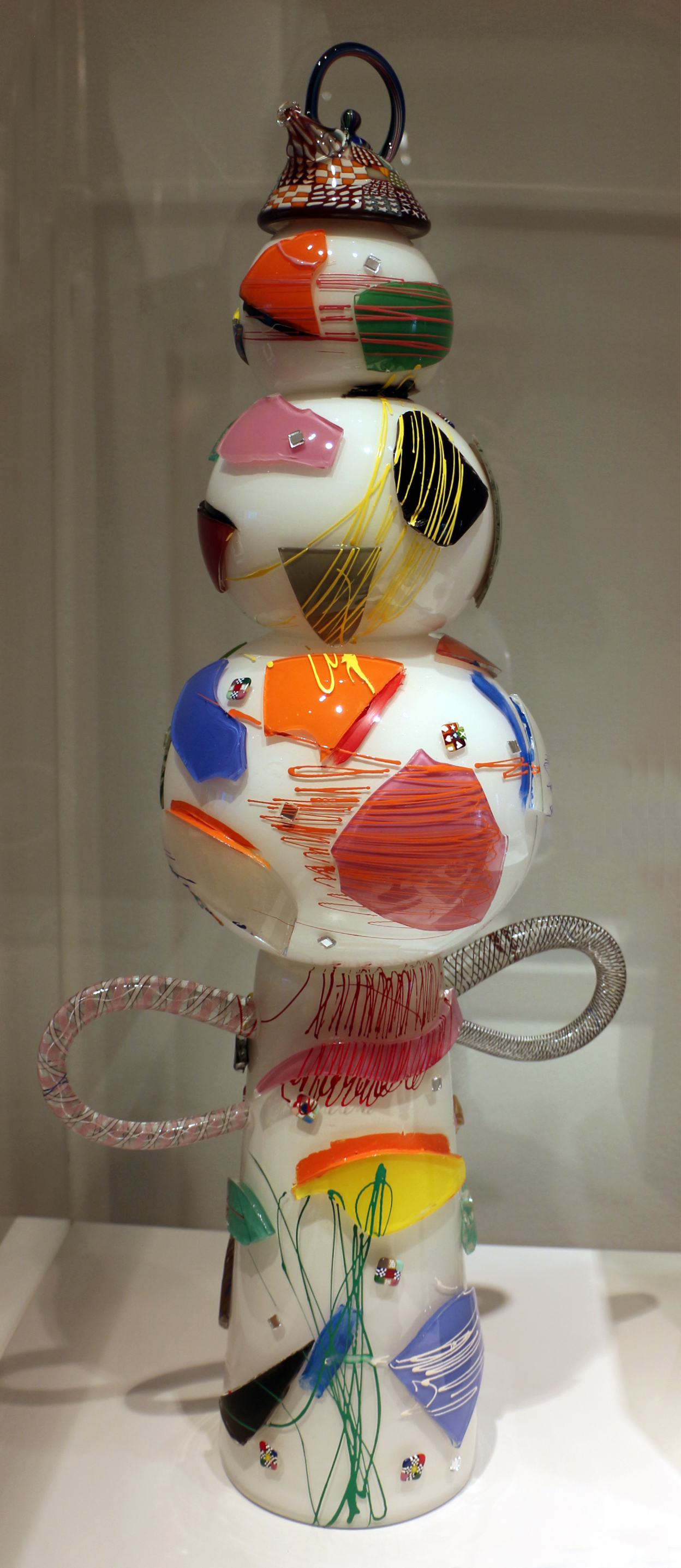
Bubble Boy -194, 1988

Following his M.A., Marquis maintained his headquarters in Berkeley. Over the ensuing years, he operated several studios, some in partnership with other artists, where he did production work (e.g. murrine marbles) both for income and to improve his skills, as well as original work. In the first few years, he traveled extensively, visiting Central America, Europe, the Far East, and Australia (twice). On many of these trips, he taught glassblowing techniques and established workshops. In 1977 he accepted a teaching position at UCLA, and from 1977 to 1982, he commuted weekly between teaching in LA and his studio in Berkeley. In 1982 he pulled up stakes in both California locations, and moved entirely to an island in Puget Sound, where he maintains his studio today. For a few years, he continued a production enterprise, which he terminated at about the time of his marriage in 1987.

Throughout his career, Marquis developed and refined glassblowing techniques, and explored experimental directions, some successful, some not. Of one experiment, a set of blown glass and neon heads, he said "I had this need to go backward, to do something entirely stupid.". He engaged in collaboration with other artists including Therman Statom and Dante Marioni, learning and perfecting new techniques and approaches, which were then reflected in his own work; and at the same time teaching, and influencing the work of those with whom he collaborated.

Marquis's body of work is characterized by a large number of series, often clearly evolving from one to the next. The work is "deceptively irreverent, playful, and frequently witty", but with amazingly perfected technique and a great deal of attention to form and color, and frequently with reference to classical glass shapes. There are also a number of signature forms, most notably murrine teapots, but also including geometric shapes, zanfirico handles, eggs, and elephants. Found objects, from Marquis's innumerable collections, are often included in his pieces.

== Personal life ==
Marquis married Johanna Nitzke, a painter and former arts administrator and gallery director, in 1987. They maintain a home and studios on an island in Puget Sound. Marquis is also an avid collector of vernacular and found objects, and his collections have been noted as an influence on the themes and imagery in his work.

== Selected solo exhibitions ==
- 1969 Palomar College, San Marcos, CA
- 1976 Tasmanian Art Museum, Hobart, Tasmania
- 1976 Queen Victoria Museum, Launceston, Tasmania
- 1978 Peabody College Art Gallery, Nashville, TN
- 1989 Auckland Art Museum, New Zealand
- 1997-98 "Richard Marquis Objects: 1967-1997," Seattle Art Museum, Seattle, WA
- 2002 Glasmuseet Ebeltoft, Denmark
- 2003 "A Commentary on Nature and the Indy 500," Museum of Northwest Art, LaConner, WA
- 2007 "The Way of the Artist," Fullerton Art Gallery, CSU, Fullerton, CA
- 2013 "Masters of Studio Glass: Richard Marquis," Corning Museum of Glass, Corning, NY
- 2019 "Dick's Works", Museum of Glass, Tacoma, WA

== Awards and honors ==
- 1963 National Merit Scholarship
- 1966 Eisner Prize for Design, U.C. Berkeley
- 1967 President's Fellowship, U.C. Berkeley
- 1969 Fulbright Grant, Venice, Italy (Venini & Co.)
- 1974, 75, 76 Australian Crafts Council Grant
- 1974, 78, 81, 90 National Endowment for the Arts Grant
- 1979, 80, 81, 82 Research Grant, U.C.L.A.
- 1982, 88 Fulbright-Hayes Grant (Senior), New Zealand
- 1995 Elected to the College of Fellows of the American Crafts Council, New York
- 1995 Selected Distinguished Alumnus, College of Environmental Design, U.C. Berkeley
- 2000 Outstanding Achievement in Glass, Urban Glass, New York
- 2004 Libensky Award, Pilchuck Glass School and Artist Series Meritage, Chateau Ste. Michelle, Woodinville, WA
- 2005 Lifetime Achievement Award, Glass Art Society
- 2006 Lifetime Achievement Award, Art Alliance for Contemporary Glass
- 2009 James Renwick Alliance Masters of the Medium Award, Smithsonian Institution, Washington DC
- 2010 Neddy Artist Fellowship, The Behnke Fellowship, Seattle, WA

== Public collections ==
=== United States ===
- Alabama
  - Mobile Museum of Art, Mobile, AL
- California
  - Craft and Folk Art Museum, Los Angeles, CA
  - Fine Arts Museums of San Francisco, de Young Legion of Honor, San Francisco, CA
  - Los Angeles County Museum of Art, Los Angeles, CA
- Florida
  - Lannan Foundation Museum, Palm Beach, FL - Palm Beach Community College Museum of Art
- Indiana
  - Indiana University Art Museum, Bloomington, IN
  - Indianapolis Museum of Art, Indianapolis, IN
- Kentucky
  - J.B. Speed Art Museum, Louisville, KY
- Louisiana
  - New Orleans Museum of Art, New Orleans, LA
- New Jersey
  - American Glass Museum, Millville, NJ
  - The Morris Museum, Morristown, NJ
- New York
  - Corning Museum of Glass, Corning, New York, NY
  - Metropolitan Museum of Art, New York, NY
  - Museum of Arts & Design, New York, NY (formerly American Craft Museum)
- North Carolina
  - Mint Museum of Art/Craft + Design, Charlotte, NC
- Ohio
  - The Toledo Museum of Art, Toledo, OH
- Pennsylvania
  - Carnegie Mellon Museum of Art, Pittsburgh, PA
  - Philadelphia Museum of Art, Philadelphia, PA
- Rhode Island
  - Museum of Art, Rhode Island School of Design, Providence, RI
- Washington
  - Seattle Art Museum, Seattle, WA
  - Seattle First National Bank, Seattle, WA
  - Seattle Sheraton Hotel and Towers, Seattle, WA
  - Swedish Hospital and Medical Center, Seattle, WA
  - Prescott Collection of Pilchuck Glass at U.S. Bank Center (Seattle), Seattle, WA
- Washington DC
  - Smithsonian American Art Museum, Washington, D.C.
- Wisconsin
  - Johnson Wax Collection, Racine, WI
  - Racine Art Museum, Racine, WI

=== Australia ===
- Australian Council for the Arts, Sydney, Australia
- Australian National Gallery, Canberra, Australia
- City Art Gallery, Wagga Wagga, New South Wales, Australia
- Tasmanian Art Museum, Hobart, Tasmania, Australia
- National Gallery of Victoria, Melbourne, Victoria, Australia
- Powerhouse Museum, Sydney, Australia
- Queen Victoria Museum and Art Gallery, Launceston, Australia

=== Canada ===
- Royal Ontario Museum, Toronto, Canada

=== Denmark ===
- Glasmuseet Ebeltoft, Ebeltoft, Denmark

=== England ===
- Victoria and Albert Museum, London, England

=== Finland ===
- Finnish National Glass Museum, Riihimaki, Finland

=== Germany ===
- Kunstmuseum, im Ehrenhof, Düsseldorf, Germany
- Museum fur Kunsthandwerk, Frankfurt, Germany

=== Holland ===
- National Glasmuseum, Leerdam, Holland

=== Japan ===
- New Glass Museum, Tsukuba, Japan
- Koganezaki Glass Museum, Shizuoka, Japan
- Sea of Japan Collection
- World Modern Glass Arts Museum, Hiroshima, Japan

=== New Zealand ===
- Dowse Art Museum, Wellington, New Zealand
- Museum of Art, Auckland, New Zealand
- National Art Museum, Auckland, New Zealand

=== Switzerland ===
- Musee des Arts Decoratifs, Lausanne, Switzerland

== Bibliography ==
- Frantz, Susanne K. (1989). Contemporary Glass: A World Survey from the Corning Museum of Glass. New York: Harry N. Abrams, Inc. ISBN 0-8109-1038-1. pp. 110–111.
- Gable, Carl I. (2004). Murano Magic: Complete Guide to Venetian Glass, its History and Artists. Atglen, Pennsylvania: Schiffer Publishing Ltd. ISBN 0-7643-1946-9.
- Hampson, Ferdinand (2012). Studio Glass in America: A 50-Year Journey. Atglen, Pennsylvania: Schiffer Publishing Ltd. ISBN 978-0-7643-4230-1. pp. 152–155.
- Klein, Dan (2001). Artists in Glass: Late Twentieth Century Masters in Glass. London: Beasley, Octopus Publishing Group. ISBN 1-84000-340-5. pp 138–141.
- Marquis, Richard (2002). Richard Marquis: Glasmuseet Ebeltoft, 30/11/2002-06/04/2003. Ebeltoft, Denmark: Glasmuseets forlag. ISBN 8791179025.
- Miller, Bonnie (1991). Out of the Fire: Contemporary Glass Artists and Their Work. San Francisco: Chronicle Books. ISBN 0-8118-0054-7. pp. 67–69.
- National Museum of Modern Art, Kyoto, ed. (1982). Contemporary Studio Glass: An International Collection. New York and Tokyo; Kyoto: John Weatherhill, Inc.; and Tankosha. ISBN 0-8348-1525-7. Plates 93-96.
- Yelle, Richard Wilfred (2000). Glass Art from Urban Glass. Atglen, Pennsylvania: Schiffer Publishing Ltd. ISBN 0-7643-1116-6. pp 163–165.
