= Shane Fero =

American artist and glass blower

Shane Fero (born 1953) is an American artist and glass blower.

== Early days ==
Shane Fero was born in Chicago, Illinois in 1953. Fero started creating glass works as a teenager, apprenticing under Jerry & Lee Coker and Roger Smith.

== Teaching ==
Fero has taught the art of glass blowing in many locations around the world. He has taught in: Penland School, Urban Glass, the Pratt Fine Arts Center, the Studio of the Corning Museum of Glass, the University of Michigan, Eugene Glass School, Espace Verre, Montreal, Quebec, the Pittsburgh Glass Center, Pilchuck Glass School, Bild-Werk, Frauenau, Germany, the International Glass Festival in Stourbridge, UK, Scuola Bubacco, Murano, Italy, Chameleon Studio, Tasmania, Australia and in Seto, Osaka, and the Niijima Glass Art Center in Japan.

== Career ==
Fero is one of the pre-eminent artists with the torch in the glass blowing community. His work can be found in museums around the world including the Glasmuseum, Ebeltoft, Denmark, the New Orleans Museum of Art, the Museum fur Glaskunst, Lauscha, Germany and the Niijima Contemporary Glass Museum, Niijima, Japan. He has had more than 30 solo exhibitions since 1992 and has participated in over 400 group exhibitions. Fero maintains a studio next to Penland School in North Carolina. His works typically include birds and totemic spirits. About his craft he says, "I choose to integrate humor and other thought provoking devices in these images. My work could be described as colorful, serious, FUN!"

== Awards ==
Fero was awarded with the Lifetime Membership Honorary Award in 2014 at the Chicago Glass Art Society Conference.

== Boards ==
Fero is Past President of the board of directors of the Glass Art Society. He finished his presidency in June 2010.
