= Vero Beach Museum of Art =

Museum in Vero Beach, Florida, United States

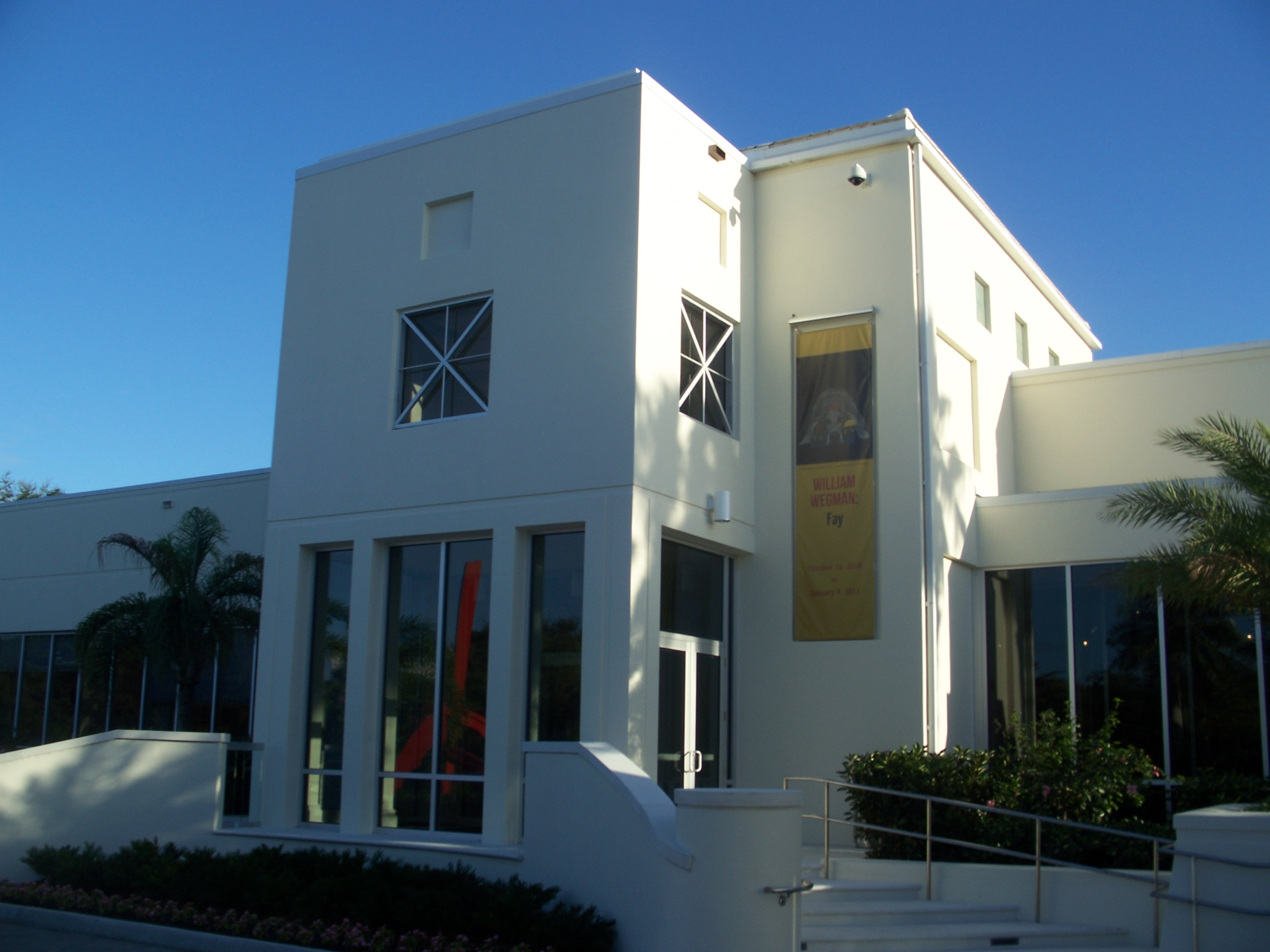

- Location within Florida
- Established: January 31, 1986
- Location: 3001 River Park Drive; Vero Beach, Florida
- Coordinates: 27.64952°N 80.36592°W
- Type: Art
- Director: Brady Roberts.
- Website: www.vbmuseum.org

The Vero Beach Museum of Art is located at 3001 River Park Drive, Vero Beach, Florida. It houses regional, state and national art exhibits. The Vero Beach Museum of Art is the principal cultural arts facility of its kind on Florida's Treasure Coast. The accredited art museum includes art exhibitions, studio art and humanities classes, exhibition tours, performances, a museum store, film studies, an art research library, workshops and seminars, children and youth events, and community cultural celebrations.

== History ==
Since 1991, the Vero Beach Museum of Art has been recognized by the State of Florida and the Florida Arts Council as a significant cultural establishment through grant awards and support. The museum was awarded accreditation from the American Alliance of Museums in April 1997. It became recognized for its professionalism, quality of programming, exhibitions, and community outreach. The museum was reaccredited in April 2007.

In 2002, the museum's Board of Trustees voted to change the institution's name from the Center for the Arts to the Vero Beach Museum of Art, which went into effect on July 1, 2002.

In February 2007, the museum added the Alice and Jim Beckwith Sculpture Park, which is 1.12 acres (4,500 m^{2}), to its exhibition spaces.

In January 2018, the museum opened the Art Zone, a new interactive Children's Space which features hands-on activities to encourage children to play and explore, as well as a 25-foot-long interactive Sketch Aquarium.

In November 2025, the museum announced that it had raised $100 million in its capital campaign for a new museum, which is expected to open in early 2028.
