= Fritz Dreisbach =

American studio glass artist and teacher

- Born: 1941 (age 84–85); Cleveland, Ohio
- Occupations: Artist, educator
- Known for: Glass artwork

Fritz Dreisbach is an American studio glass artist and teacher who is recognized as one of the pioneers of the American Studio Glass Movement.

== Early life and education ==
Dreisbach was born in Cleveland, Ohio. He attended Hiram College in Hiram, Ohio, where he was awarded a Bachelor of Arts in 1962; Oberlin College in Oberlin, Ohio, where he received a Master of Arts in Teaching. in 1963 and the University of Iowa, where he received a Master of Arts in 1965. He received a Master of Fine Arts in 1967 from the University of Wisconsin, where he was an assistant to Harvey Littleton.

== Teaching ==
In a 35-year teaching career, the artist taught at 130 institutions worldwide, including the School of the Toledo Museum of Art, Pilchuck Glass School in Stanwood, Washington and Penland School of Crafts in Penland, North Carolina. His former students include glass artists Sam Stang and Mary Shaffer.

== Awards and grants ==
A founding member of the Seattle-based Glass Art Society (G.A.S.) in 1971, The Glass Art Society presented Dreisbach with its Lifetime Achievement Award Dreisbach was awarded Honorary Life Membership in the society in 1987. In 2002 he was presented with The Glass Art Society's Lifetime Achievement Award at a ceremony in Amsterdam. In 1988 he was elected to the College of Fellows of the American Craft Council.

== Public collections ==
In the United States Dreisbach's work is included in the public collections of the American Craft Museum, New York City; Cincinnati Museum of Art, Cincinnati, Ohio; Cooper-Hewitt Museum, New York City; Corning Museum of Glass, Corning, New York; High Museum of Art Atlanta, Georgia; Mint Museum of Art, Charlotte, North Carolina and the National Collection of American Art, Renwick Gallery, Smithsonian Institution, Washington, DC. Overseas his work can be found in the Glasmuseet Ebeltoft, Ebeltoft, Denmark, Glasmuseum Frauenau, Frauenau, Germany; Museum Boijmans Van Beuningen, Rotterdam, Netherlands and the Birmingham Museum of Art, Birmingham, England.
