= Marvin Lipofsky =

American glass artist (1938–2016)

- Born: September 1, 1938; Elgin, Illinois, U.S.
- Died: January 15, 2016 (aged 77); Oakland, California, U.S.
- Other names: Marvin Bently Lipofsky, Marvin B. Lipofsky
- Occupations: Artist, educator
- Known for: Studio glass artist

Marvin Bentley Lipofsky (September 1, 1938 – January 15, 2016) was an American glass artist. He was one of the six students that Studio Glass founder Harvey Littleton instructed in a program at the University of Wisconsin-Madison in fall 1962 and spring 1963. He was a central figure in the dissemination of the American Studio Glass Movement, introducing it to California through his tenure as an instructor at the University of California, Berkeley and the California College of Arts and Crafts.

== Education and teaching career ==
Lipofsky was raised in Barrington, Illinois, where his family owned a department store. In 1962, he earned a BFA in Industrial Design from the University of Illinois, and he went on to earn both an MS and an MFA in Sculpture from the University of Wisconsin–Madison in 1964. There he studied under Harvey Littleton, the founder, with assistance from Dominick Labino, of the Studio Glass Movement. He would introduce the concepts of the movement during his subsequent tenure as a Design instructor at the University of California, Berkeley, where he taught until 1972. During this time he was responsible for training many studio artists. Notable students of Marvin Lipofsky include John Lewis (b. 1942), Richard Marquis (b. 1945) and Jay Musler (b. 1947).

Lipofsky has been an instructor for seminars and workshops at art and craft schools, including the Pilchuck Glass School in Stanwood, Washington; Columbus College of Art and Design in Columbus, Ohio, Southwest Craft Center in San Antonio, Texas; Haystack Mountain School of Crafts in Deer Isle, Maine; Bezalel Academy of Arts and Design in Jerusalem, Israel; San Francisco Art Institute, San Francisco, California and the Art Department of the University of Wisconsin, Madison. As a visiting artist he has traveled widely in the United States and internationally to Israel, Spain, France, Bulgaria, Sweden, Finland, Japan, and the Netherlands.

== Founder and collaborator ==
In 1967 Lipofsky founded the glass program at the California College of Arts and Crafts, which he headed for two decades. He was also a founder of the Glass Art Society (G.A.S.), serving as president of that organization from 1978 to 1980. Lipofsky was one of the first American glass artists to travel to Czechoslovakia, where a studio glass movement had arisen in the 1950s. This would prove to be the first of many trips he would take; he became well known for his journeys abroad and his collaboration with numerous glass artists around the world.

== Work ==
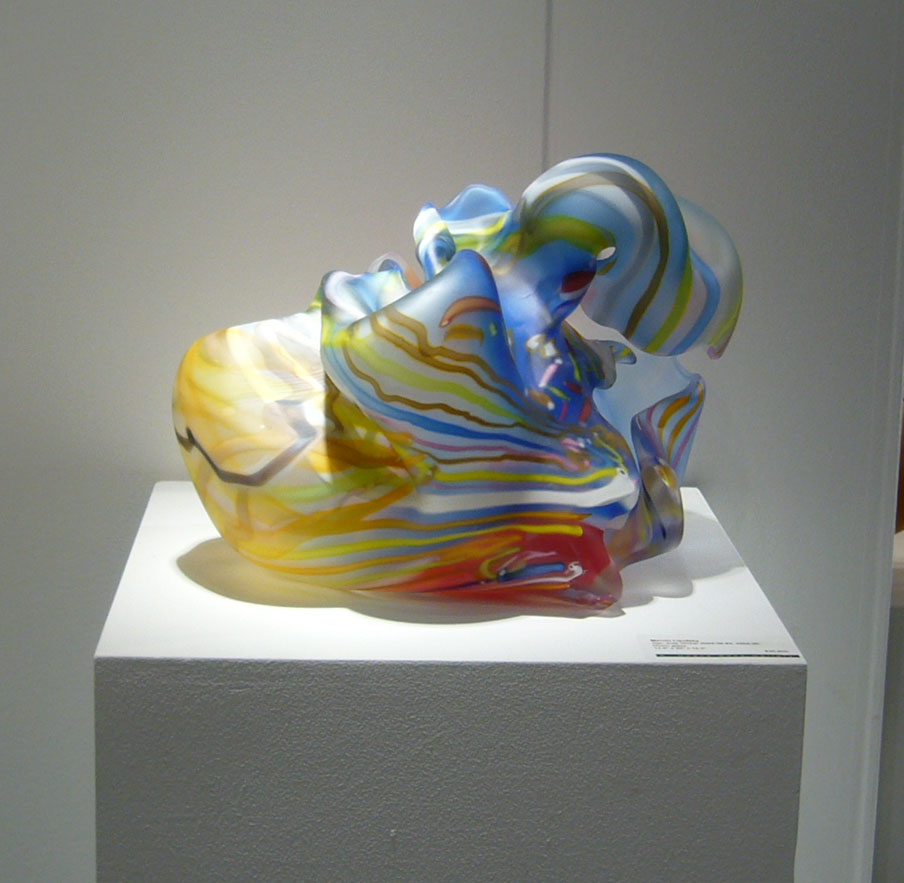

Many of Lipofsky's works are colorful "bubbles" of glass. Often semi-translucent they allow the viewer to examine their depths. He is best known for the organic form of his pieces. “His art is about the visceral and the gestural,” wrote Studio Glass connoisseur Dan Klein. “The forms are inspired by internal organs, intestines, breast, stomachs, brains; their colorful, mottled, crumpled, broken shapes and expression of turbulence and restlessness.” Lipofsky is well known for having devoted his career in glass to endless variations on the turbulent, broken bubble form. His work, in short, is about glassblowing and the ways in which a blown glass sphere can be opened, shaped and distorted. Corning Museum of Glass curator Tina Oldknow has written that she admires Lipofsky “for his devotion to material and form. His non-objective vessels break apart and rearrange the blown glass mass while retaining the breathy, ephemeral quality that is one of the medium’s most intriguing characteristics".

== Awards ==
Notable awards garnered by the artist include a Lifetime Achievement Award from the Art Alliance for Contemporary Glass in Chicago, Illinois in 2005 and a Masters of the Medium Award from the James Renwick Alliance, Smithsonian Institution, Washington, DC in 2003. He was named an Honorary Lifetime Member of the Glass Art Society (G.A.S.) in 1986 and a California Living Treasure in Sacramento, California in 1985. The artist was the recipient of two National Endowment for the Arts grants in 1976 and 1974.

== Collections ==
Lipofsky's work has been collected by many public institutions worldwide. In the United States his work can be found in the collections of the Corning Museum of Glass in Corning, New York; High Museum of Art, Atlanta, Georgia; Los Angeles County Museum of Art, Oakland Museum, Oakland, California; Metropolitan Museum of Art, New York City; Philadelphia Museum of Art and Toledo Museum of Art, Toledo, Ohio. Overseas his work is in Glasmuseet Ebeltoft in Denmark; Frauenau Glass Museum (Sammlung Wolfgang Kermer), Germany; Museum Bellrive in Zürich, Switzerland; Museum Boijmans van Beuningen in Rotterdam, Holland; National Museum of Modern Art, Kyoto, Japan and Hokkaido Museum of Modern Art in Sapporo, Japan.

== Personal life and death ==
The artist resided in Berkeley, California. He was an alumnus of Zeta Beta Tau fraternity.

Lipofsky died on January 15, 2016, at the age of 77 from complications of diabetes.
