= Harvey Littleton =

American artist and educator (1922–2013)

- Harvey Littleton hot-working glass, c. 1983
- Born: June 14, 1922; Corning, New York, U.S.
- Died: December 13, 2013 (aged 91); Spruce Pine, North Carolina, U.S.
- Other names: Harvey Kline Littleton, Harvey K. Littleton
- Education: BD (1947), Industrial Design, University of Michigan; MFA (1951), Ceramics and Metals, Cranbrook Academy of Art
- Occupations: Artist, educator
- Known for: Founder, American studio glass movement

Harvey Littleton (June 14, 1922 – December 13, 2013) was an American glass artist and educator, one of the founders of the studio glass movement; he is often referred to as the "Father of the Studio Glass Movement". Born in Corning, New York, he grew up in the shadow of Corning Glass Works, where his father headed Research and Development during the 1930s. Expected by his father to enter the field of physics, Littleton instead chose a career in art, gaining recognition first as a ceramist and later as a glassblower and sculptor in glass. In the latter capacity he was very influential, organizing the first glassblowing seminar aimed at the studio artist in 1962, on the grounds of the Toledo Museum of Art. Imbued with the prevailing view at the time that glassblowing could only be done on the factory floor, separated from the designer at his desk, Littleton aimed to put it within the reach of the individual studio artist.

In his role as an educator, Littleton was an "... outspoken and eloquent advocate of university education in the arts." He initiated the first hot glass program at an American university (the University of Wisconsin–Madison) and promoted the idea of glass as a course of study in university art departments in the United States. Littleton's students went on to disseminate the study of glass art and establish other university-level hot glass programs throughout the U.S.

Littleton retired from teaching in 1977 to focus on his own art. Exploring the inherent qualities of the medium, he worked in series with simple forms to draw attention to the complex interplay of transparent glass with multiple overlays of thin color.

While at Wisconsin, as an outgrowth of a workshop he taught in cold-working techniques for glass, Littleton began experimenting with printmaking from glass panes. As an independent artist, his studio included space for printmaking, and he continued to explore and develop the techniques of vitreography.

Littleton worked as an independent glassblower and sculptor until chronic back problems forced him to abandon hot glass in 1990, and he continued his creative interest in vitreography well beyond that.

== Early life ==
Harvey Kline Littleton was born in Corning, New York, the fourth offspring of Dr. Jesse T. Littleton Jr., and Bessie Cook Littleton. His father was a physicist who had been recruited from the faculty at the University of Michigan to join the first research team at Corning Glass Works. Director of Research at the time of Harvey's birth (and later a Vice President of Corning), Dr. Littleton is remembered today as the developer of Pyrex glassware and for his work on tempered glass.

Harvey Littleton's introduction to the world of glass began when he was six. On Saturdays his father would take Harvey off his mother's hands for a few hours by bringing him to the laboratory. There he was turned over to the laboratory stockman who entertained him or, at least, kept the little boy out of trouble. When he was twelve, Harvey and his siblings were at the glassworks watching at the time of the failure of the first casting of the two-hundred inch mirror for the Hale Telescope at Palomar Observatory. At home, the properties of glass and its manufacture were frequent topics at the family dinner-table. Dr. Littleton was fascinated by glass and believed that the material had almost unlimited uses.

Littleton attended high school at Corning Free Academy. (Note: Corning Free Academy was one of two high schools in Corning from the 1920s until 1963, when new high schools opened and CFA became a middle school. CFA closed its doors in 2014, and the building was converted to luxury apartments.) His interest in art developed during this time, and he took life drawing and sculpture courses through an extension program at Elmira College.

== Education ==
When he was eighteen, Littleton enrolled at the University of Michigan to study physics. His choice of major was influenced by his father, who wanted one of his children to follow him in his profession (Littleton's oldest sibling Martha was an industrial psychologist; his oldest brother Jesse chose medicine as a career; and his brother Joe became a Vice President of Corning's Technical Products Division). According to Littleton, "I always thought I would be a physicist like my father".

While studying physics, Littleton also took sculpture classes with Avard Fairbanks at Michigan, which fueled his growing preference for art. After three semesters of physics, the pull of art proved stronger than his respect for his father's wishes, and, with sister Martha's encouragement he arranged to study at Cranbrook Academy of Art for the 1941 spring semester. There he studied metalwork with Harry Bertoia and sculpture with Marshall Fredericks, and worked part-time as a studio assistant to the aging Carl Milles. Dr. Littleton was not pleased by his son's decision. Littleton enlisted Martha's aid in arriving at a compromise: Littleton would return to the University of Michigan that fall, to major in industrial design. He also enrolled in a ceramics class, with Mary Chase Stratton

During the summers of 1941 and 1942 Littleton worked at Corning. In summer 1942, working as a mold maker in the Vycor multiform project laboratory, he cast his first work in glass. Using a neoclassic torso he had modeled in clay, he made a casting in white Vycor. (Note: Littleton's first glass casting is in the collection of the Corning Museum of Glass (CMOG). William Warmus, the Curator of Modern Glass at CMOG from 1978 to 1984, has said that the making of this piece was "the founding event of contemporary glass.")

Following the Pearl Harbor attack, Littleton tried to volunteer in the Coast Guard, the Air Force, and the Marines, but was rejected because of his poor eyesight. In the fall of 1942, he was drafted into the Army, interrupting his continued study. He was assigned to the Signal Corps, and served in North Africa, France, and Italy. Near the end of the war, he received a commendation for developing a decoding device. In England awaiting his turn to be shipped home, he attended classes at the Brighton School of Art to fill time. He modeled and fired another small clay torso that he carried home in his barracks bag. Once back in Corning, New York, Littleton cast the torso, again in Vycor, as a small edition. (Note: Littleton made four castings, and an additional four were made at Corning after he had returned to Michigan. The first casting, which Littleton did extra cold-working on, was shown in the annual Exhibition for Michigan Artists at the Detroit Institute of Arts, and was acquired by the Arnot Art Museum in Elmira, New York, where it remains as of 2017.)

Littleton returned to the University of Michigan in January, 1946, and finished his degree in industrial design in 1947. With his father's encouragement Littleton submitted a proposal to Corning to create a workshop within the factory to research the aesthetic properties of industrial glass. When this proposal was not accepted, Littleton and two friends, Bill Lewis and Aare Lahti, opened a design studio called Corporate Designers in Ann Arbor. After obtaining an equipment order from the Goat's Nest Ceramic Studio in Ann Arbor, Littleton began teaching evening pottery classes there. Later, when the Goat's nest was put on the market, he helped his students form a co-op that became the Ann Arbor Potter's Guild. At about the same time, he found a teaching job at the Museum School of the Toledo Museum of Art.

In 1949, Littleton enrolled under the GI Bill as a graduate student in ceramics at Cranbrook Academy of Art, studying under Finnish potter Maija Grotell. Commuting weekly between Toledo, Ohio and Bloomfield Hills, Michigan, he played Wednesday-night poker in Toledo with a group that included Dominick Labino, who would be important to the success of his seminal workshops a dozen years later.

Littleton received the MFA degree in ceramics in 1951, with a minor in metals. With a recommendation from Grotell, he landed a teaching post at the University of Wisconsin, Madison (UWM).

== Career ==
=== University of Wisconsin 1951–1962: ceramics and glass exploration ===
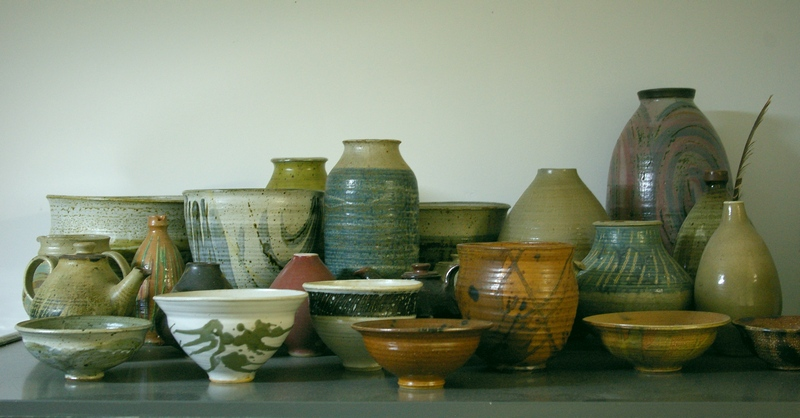
A selection of Harvey Littleton's 1950s work in ceramics

Littleton and his family purchased a farm about 12 miles from the Wisconsin campus. This location served Harvey as home, studio, laboratory, and sometime-classroom. His production as a potter focused on functional stoneware that he sold in Chicago-area art fairs and in galleries from Chicago to New York City. His work was included in group shows in the United States, including "Designer Craftsmen U.S.A.," sponsored by the American Craft Council (ACC) in 1953 and the Ceramic National exhibition at the Syracuse Museum of Fine Arts (now the Everson Museum of Art) in 1954. His pottery gained international exposure in 1956 at the First International Exposition of Ceramics in Cannes, France. As his reputation grew, he also participated in advancing his craft; he was elected one of the first craftsmen-trustees of the American Craft Council, he received a small research grant from the university to explore glazing processes, and he designed a manually operated wheel called the "Littleton Kick Wheel", which was used by students in the ceramics lab at the UWM.

In 1957-58 Littleton took a year's leave. A university research grant allowed him to visit Europe to study the influence of Islamic culture on contemporary Spanish pottery. He first stopped in Paris to visit Jean Sala, who had been recommended to him as an artist who worked alone in glass. Though Sala was no longer active in glass, he took Littleton to his now-idle studio. Conditioned by all of his experience at Corning, Littleton knew only of glass-making in an industrial setting, by a team of workers.

After four and a half months of research in Spain, Littleton visited the site of his war-time service in Naples. He was surprised to find seven small glass factories there. On a later visit to the island of Murano, he visited more than fifty glass factories. He was fascinated by the little demonstration furnaces that some of the factories placed outside their walls. The furnaces would be staffed by a couple of the factory's glassblowers, who would perform their craft for tourists. His meeting with Sala and his Murano experiences stimulated his interest in making glass art in a private studio.

Upon his return to the university and his Verona, Wisconsin studio Littleton began melting small batches of glass in his ceramics kiln, using hand-thrown stoneware bowls as crucibles. He built his first glass furnace in the summer of 1959. As a result of these ongoing experiments, the ACC asked him to chair a panel on glass at its Third National Conference, at Lake George, New York, in 1958. The panelists were glass artists and designers Michael and Frances Higgins and Earl McCutchen, who worked in laminated glass at the University of Georgia. Paul Perrot, director of the Corning Museum of Glass, was the fifth panelist. At this conference, Littleton suggested that glass should be a medium for the individual artist. By the time the ACC convened its fourth conference in 1961, Littleton not only presented a paper on his own work in glass but also exhibited a sculpture made of three faceted pieces of cullet that he had melted, formed and carved in the previous year. By this time, Littleton was applying for grants to get his vision of a hot glass studio program at the university off the ground.

=== 1962 glass workshops ===
When no grants for a hot glass studio had materialized by the fall of 1961, Otto Wittmann, director of the Toledo Museum of Art, suggested that Littleton consider giving a glassblowing seminar at the museum, and offered the use of a storage shed on the museum grounds. The first of two workshops was held in this makeshift facility from March 23 to April 1, 1962.

Wittman had sent a letter to a number of ceramists in the U.S. inviting them to participate in the workshop, and asked Norm Schulman, the pottery instructor at the museum school, to facilitate the arrangements. The eight attendees in addition to Littleton and Schulman were: Dominick Labino (then director of research for Johns Manville Corporation), Clayton Bailey, who was Littleton's graduate assistant from the University of Wisconsin, Tom McGlauchlin from the University of Iowa (who had been Littleton's graduate assistant at Wisconsin the previous year), Karl Martz from Indiana University, John Stephenson from the University of Michigan, William Pitney from Wayne State University, artist Dora Reynolds, and Edith Franklin, one of Schulman's ceramics students. Littleton provided a small pot furnace he had built. In the first couple of days, the participants spent much of the time trying to find a workable glass formula and getting batches of glass melted, leaving very little time to experiment with actual blowing. Labino suggested converting the furnace to a day tank, which would have a larger capacity, and provided some borosilicate marbles to melt instead of mixing a formula. This glass proved easy to work for glass blowing, and the workshop participants experimented with it in shifts for the remainder of the week. On the final day of the workshop, Harvey Leafgreen, a retired glassblower from the Libbey glass plant in Toledo, happened in to see the public display of the workshop products, and presented an unexpected two-hour demonstration of the craft.

The facilities that had been built for the first workshop were left in place, and a second, longer, better advertised Toledo workshop was held from June 18–30. Littleton and Wittman had attracted a small amount of financial support for scholarships and other costs. Leafgreen was enlisted to assist, and shared teaching duties with Littleton, Labino, and Schulman. In addition, there were lecturers on glass history and on furnace and annealing technology. This workshop had a larger and more diverse group of participants.

Because the facilities for annealing were very crude, very few of the pieces made in the two workshops survived for very long. Of all the participants in the workshops, only McLaughlin and Littleton himself pursued a glass career. Even so, from the standpoint of what was learned about how to build and operate a studio/teaching facility, the two Toledo workshops were a resounding success, and have been recognized as the genesis of the American studio glass movement.

=== University of Wisconsin 1962–1977: glass development ===
In the summer of 1962 Littleton once again traveled to Europe, this time to research how glass was taught in universities there. He found nothing that he could bring back to the U.S. to help him educate art students at the University of Wisconsin. At that time, European glass programs were geared solely toward industrial production. Students were not taught hands-on techniques with the material; the craft of working with hot glass was still taught at the factories, under the apprenticeship system. What Littleton did find in Europe was a kindred spirit in glass art, the German Erwin Eisch, who is recognized today as a founder of European studio glass. Eisch had set up a small work area in his family's glass factory in Frauenau for the production of his own glass art. Trained as a fine artist in the academies of Germany, he was largely self-taught as a glass blower and at the time produced his work with the help of the factory's craftsmen. The friendship begun when Littleton visited Eisch in Frauenau in 1962 lasted for the rest of Littleton's life, and had profound influence on the work of each. The two spent some of almost every summer together for the next thirty years.

Through the fall 1962 and spring 1963 semesters, Littleton taught glass in a garage at his Verona farm to six students under an independent study program. By the following year, based on the success of the Toledo workshops and the independent study course, he had secured University of Wisconsin funding to rent and equip an off-campus hot shop in Madison and authorization to offer a graduate level glass course.

With the launching of the first college glass program Littleton said that he "... became a kind of evangelist for the medium." He gave lectures at university art departments throughout the United States about the potential of glass as a medium for the studio artist. "Studio glass," to Littleton, meant hands-on glassblowing (as opposed to kiln-forming or cold-working) by the individual artist.

As the glass program grew, so did Littleton's work and reputation as an artist who used glass. In 1964, he had a solo exhibition at the Museum of Contemporary Crafts in New York. In 1966, a five-year retrospective, Harvey Littleton: Glass, showed at the Milwaukee Art Center.

Littleton presented papers on his experiments in glassblowing at crafts conferences in the United States and elsewhere. In 1968, Labino's book Visual Art in Glass became the first book to be written about the studio glass movement. It was followed in 1971 by Glassblowing: A Search for Form, by Harvey K. Littleton.

Through the university's glass program, Littleton taught many who became prominent glass artists, and who, in turn, spread the word about studio glassmaking into academic institutions throughout the United States. These included Bill Boysen, who originated the glass program at Southern Illinois University Carbondale and taught there for many years; Dale Chihuly, who developed the glass program (which had been started by Norm Schulman) at the Rhode Island School of Design and later was a founder of Pilchuck Glass School in Stanwood, Washington; Fritz Dreisbach, teacher at more than 130 institutions around the world over his career; Audrey Handler, one of Littleton's first female students, who in 1970 opened her private glass blowing studio in Verona, Wisconsin that is still in operation today; Henry Halem, who introduced glass at Kent State University; Sam Herman, who took the studio glass movement to Great Britain; Curt Hoard, originator of a glass program at the University of Minnesota; Marvin Lipofsky, who started glass programs at the University of California, Berkeley and at California College of Arts and Crafts; Fred Marcus, who started programs at Illinois State University, the University of Illinois, and University of California, Los Angeles; Tom McGlauchlin, who taught the second-ever course in glass at an American college, at the University of Iowa; Christopher Ries; Michael Taylor, who headed the glass program at the Rochester Institute of Technology for almost 20 years; Kent Ipsen, one of Littleton's first students who taught at Mankato State College and later chaired the crafts department and founded the highly respected glass program at the Virginia Commonwealth University School of Arts; Michael Whitley, initiator of a glass program at Central Washington State College.

Throughout these years a steady stream of visitors from elsewhere in the United States, and from Europe, came to Madison, where they observed and learned, and occasionally demonstrated their own skills. Many carried the idea of studio glass back to their home institutions.

Littleton served as the chairman of the University of Wisconsin art department from 1964 to 1967 and from 1969 to 1971. He retired from teaching in 1976, in order to devote his full attention to making work in glass. In 1977 Littleton was named professor emeritus of art at the University of Wisconsin, Madison. In 2001, Harvey Littleton's work was shown in a retrospective exhibition called Harvey K. Littleton Reflections, 1946-1994 at the Elvehjem Musueum of Art at UW.

=== "Technique is cheap" ===
In 1972 Littleton was at the Seventh National Sculpture Conference in Lawrence, Kansas when he uttered the words, "Technique is cheap." The statement touched off a debate that still finds currency among glass artists: Should technique, or content, take precedence in glass art? (Note: In glass sculptor Paul Stankard's words, "Is studio glass craft or art?" Stankard writes that he "... interpreted the statement ["Technique is cheap"] to mean that the idea was more important than the skilled virtuosity required to express it." Stankard, a well-known flameworker whose art lies in delicately rendered plant, insect and human forms encapsulated in crystal, finds "... this philosophical approach to art-making in glass fascinating" but contrary to his own approach, where mastering a high level of skill was prerequisite to the execution of his ideas. "... my work demanded a commitment to technique, which was not cheap for me, because it required years of practice and experimentation to master ...")

This was a question that Littleton had evidently been thinking about for some time. In his 1971 book, Glassblowing: A Search for Form, he wrote:

The method used by the contemporary artist is a constant probing and questioning of the standards of the past and the definitions of the present to find an opening for new form statements in the material and process. It is even said that this search is an end in itself. Although knowledge of chemistry or physics as they apply to glass will broaden the artist's possibilities, it cannot create them. Tools can be made, furnaces and annealing ovens can be built cheaply. But it is through the insatiable, adventurous urge of the artist to discover the essence of glass that his own means of expression will emerge.

The offhand phrase "technique is cheap" soon took on a life of its own. For some it was a rallying cry to discover the inherent possibilities of a "new" medium for the artist; for others the statement expressed nothing more than arrogant disdain for the timeless value of craftsmanship. In a 2001 interview for the Smithsonian's Archives of American Art, Littleton commented on what he termed the "misinterpretation" of the phrase:

All I meant by that is that technique is available to everybody, that you can read technique, if you have any background. Technique in and of itself is nothing. But technique in the hands of a strong, creative person, like Voulkos or Dante Marioni, takes on another dimension.

Behind this point is another, as expressed by writer and curator William Warmus: "It might even be argued that Littleton sought long-term to put the artist back in control of the factory, even as he sought to put the furnace into the artist's studio."

For Littleton, the epitome of technique vs. content was to be found in factory-made art glass, where the division of labor was inflexible. Traditionally the art glass designer was a draftsman who made a conceptual drawing for a glass object, and then passed it along to industry craftsmen for execution. According to Littleton, the factory designer "... is frustrated by the peculiar misplacement of his skill, and his inclusion in a process where little experimentation or interference is permitted. As for the factory craftsman, his training under the apprenticeship system "limited him to one phase in the production of glass. This training could not prepare anyone to function as an independent artist, but only to serve as a cog in the industrial machinery."

=== Work in glass ===
Harvey Littleton, Yellow Ruby Sliced Descending Form (c. 1983) This four-part glass sculpture is typical of the artist's "Arc" forms

In 1962 Littleton's first pieces in blown glass were, like his earlier works in pottery, functional forms: vases, bowls and paperweights. His breakthrough to non-functional form came in 1963 when, with no purpose in mind, he remelted and finished a glass piece that he had earlier smashed in a fit of pique. The object lay in his studio for several weeks before he decided to grind the bottom. As Littleton recounts in his book Glassblowing: A Search for Form, he brought the object into the house where "it aroused such antipathy in my wife that I looked at it much more closely, finally deciding to send it to an exhibition. Its refusal there made me even more obstinate, and I took it to New York ... I later showed it to the curators of design at the Museum of Modern Art. They, perhaps relating it to some other neo-Dada work in the museum, purchased it for the Design Collection." This led to Littleton's mid-1960s series of broken-open forms, and "Prunted", "Imploded" and "Exploded" forms.

These sculptures, especially the "Prunted", or "Anthropomorpic", forms were heavily influenced Eisch. Shortly after Eisch's departure from a several-week period as artist-in-residence at Wisconsin in fall 1967, Littleton realized that he had unconsciously adopted his friend's strongly personal figural style in his own work, and began a radical change. In a period of a few weeks he eliminated references to the vessel and turned from complexity to a new vocabulary of simple, clean geometric shapes, forming graceful tubes, rods and columns of clear glass encasing lines of color, that he cut and grouped together on bases of plate glass or steel.

Allowing the pull of gravity to stretch and bend hot glass while on the blowpipe or punty led Littleton to his "Folded Forms" and "Loops" series, which continued until 1979. His "Eye" forms, also from the 1970s, take the form of concentric cups of various colors in diminishing sizes that nestle one inside the next.

Littleton explored cutting and slumping industrial glass, including plate and optic glass, beginning in 1970. In sculptures such as Do Not Spindle and Distortion Box, slumped squares of glass are transfixed by a brass rod. In Rock Around the Clock, a bent piece of optic glass bar from Corning Glass Works in Danville, Virginia, can be set rocking on its bronze plate glass base with a touch of the hand.

Littleton incorporated optical lens blanks manufactured by Corning with his own hot-worked glass. In each case he sandblasted and cut the optical disc, draping, and in one case piercing, the disc with fluid, cased glass forms. These were followed, in 1978, by Littleton's Solid Geometry series, in which heavy cased glass forms were cut into trapezoidal, spheroid and ovoid shapes and highly polished.

Perhaps Littleton's best known body of work is his "Topological Geometry" group of series, made between 1983 and 1989. Included under this heading are his signature "Arc" forms and "Crowns", as well as his late "Lyrical Movement" and "Implied Movement" sculptural groups. In 1989 chronic back problems forced Littleton to retire from working in hot glass.

In 1974, Littleton also began experimenting with vitreography (Note: The term "vitreography" was not coined until the mid-1980s, by Connor Everts while visiting Littleton's studio (see vitreography).) (printmaking using glass plates). He received a research grant from the university in 1975 to continue this work, and his first prints from this process were shown in a show at the Madison Art Center. When he left Wisconsin in 1977 and established his own studio in Spruce Pine, North Carolina, he designated one room in the studio for printmaking. By 1981, he had hired a part-time printmaker, and in 1983 he built a separate facility for the presses. He regularly invited artists in various media to explore the possibilities. Littleton's own prints were often simple geometric shapes, and sometimes made from shotgun-shattered safety glass. When back problems forced him to stop working in hot glass in 1990, Littleton continued his printmaking.

== Personal life ==
Littleton was married to Bess Tamura Littleton in 1947. She predeceased him on October 8, 2009. The couple had five children, one of whom died in her early youth. The surviving four all work in the field of glass art. Daughter Carol L. Shay is the curator at Littleton Studios; Tom Littleton owns and manages Spruce Pine Batch Company (founded by his father), which supplies batch (the dry ingredients of which glass is made) and colors to artists and art departments around the U.S.; Maurine Littleton is the owner and director of Maurine Littleton Gallery which specializes in glass art, in Washington, DC. With his wife and collaborative partner, Kate Vogel, John Littleton is a glass artist in Bakersville, North Carolina.

Harvey Littleton died on December 13, 2013, aged 91 at his home in Spruce Pine, North Carolina.

== Public collections ==
Sources:

- Bergstrom-Mahler Museum of Glass (Neenah, WI)
- Chrysler Museum of Art (Norfolk, VA)
- Corning Museum of Glass (NY)
- Detroit Institute of Arts (MI)
- Glasmuseet Ebeltoft (Denmark)
- Frauenau Glass Museum (Germany)
- High Museum of Art (Atlanta, GA)
- Hokkaido Museum of Modern Art (Sapporo, Japan)
- Indianapolis Museum of Art (IN)
- Kunstgewerbemuseum Berlin (Germany)
- Kunstmuseum der Veste Coburg (Coburg, Germany)
- Leigh Yawkey Woodson Art Museum (Wausau, WI)
- Los Angeles County Museum of Art (CA)
- Memphis Brooks Museum of Art (TN)
- Metropolitan Museum of Art (New York, NY)
- Milwaukee Art Museum (WI)
- Morris Museum (Morristown, NJ)
- Museum Angewandte Kunst (Frankfurt, Germany)
- Museum of Applied Arts, Vienna (Austria)
- Museum of Arts & Design (New York, NY)
- Museum Boijmans van Beuningen (Rotterdam, Netherlands)
- Museum of Decorative Arts, Prague (Czech Republic)
- Museum of Design Zürich (Switzerland)
- Museum of Fine Arts, Houston (TX)
- Museum für Kunst und Gewerbe Hamburg (Germany)
- Museum of Modern Art (New York, NY)
- National Museum of Modern Art, Kyoto (Japan)
- New Orleans Museum of Art (LA)
- Smithsonian American Art Museum (Washington, DC)
- Toledo Museum of Art (OH)
- Victoria and Albert Museum (London, England)
