= Dietrich Langko =

German landscape painter

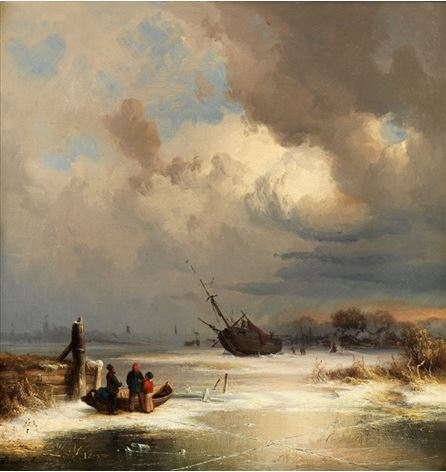
Icy River Landscape with a Ship

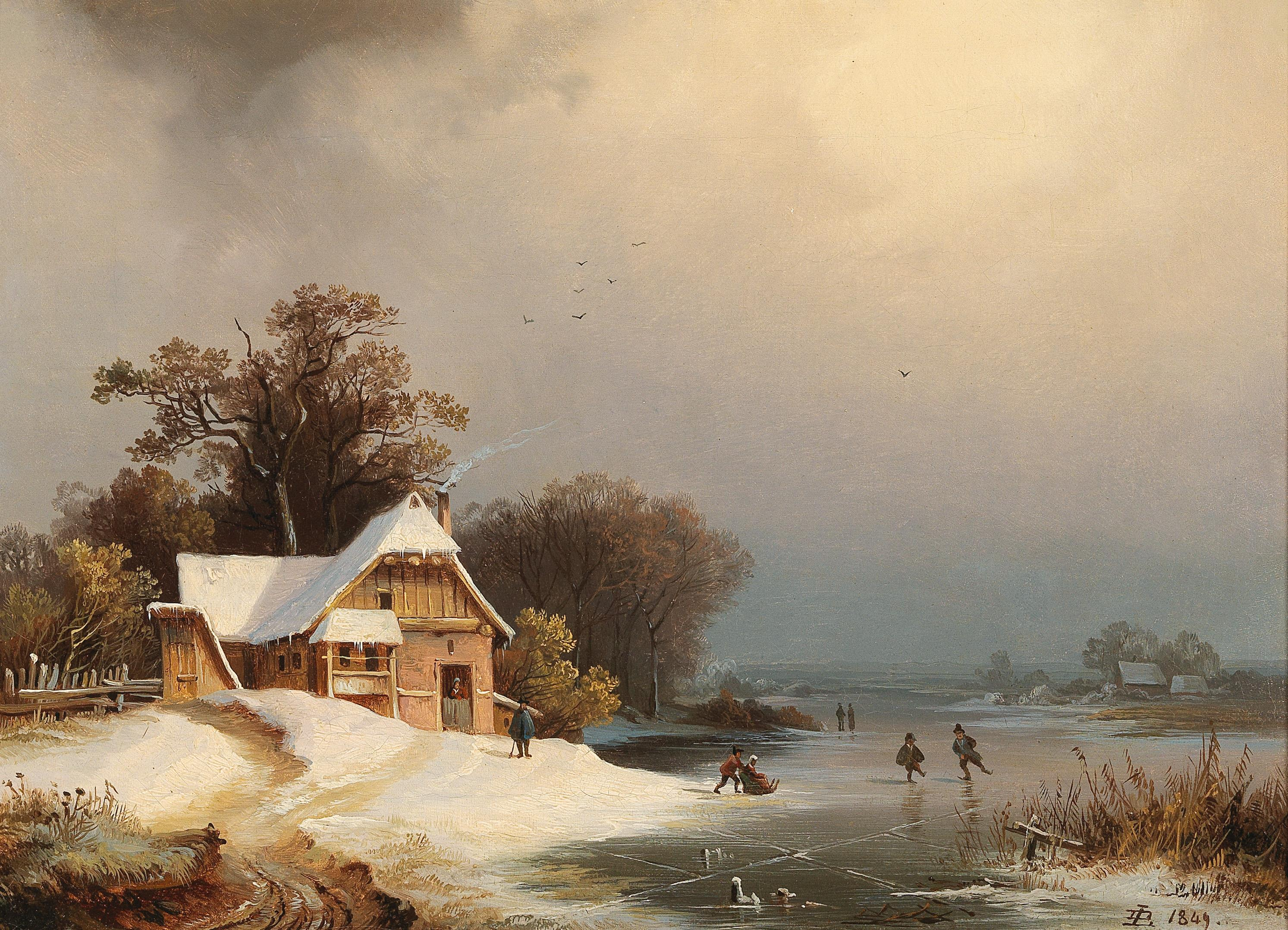
Ice Skating

Dietrich Langko (1 June 1819, Hamburg - 8 November 1896, Munich) was a German landscape painter; especially known for his winter scenes.

== Biography ==
He came from a humble background. After finishing primary school, he was apprenticed as a theatrical stage painter in Hamburg. He was, however, more interested in landscape painting, so he took private lessons, once a week, from Jacob Gensler. His first paintings were created near the estuaries of the Elbe River. In 1832, he became a member of the Hamburger Künstlerverein (Artists' Association).

In 1840, with Gensler's help, he obtained a scholarship that enabled him to study at the Academy of Fine Arts, Munich. Once there, he found a place in the circle of painters associated with Christian Morgenstern, who was also from Hamburg.

Although he was attending the Academy, the primary influence on his style, by his own account, came from Albert Zimmermann, whose private painting school in Ebersberg he attended for several Summers. By the end of the decade, he was being asked to participate in exhibitions by the Kunstverein München. In 1851, he was able to go on a study trip to Paris with Carl Ebert, Eduard Schleich and Carl Spitzweg.

In 1869, Schleich organized a large exhibition at the Glaspalast, which turned out to be Langko's career breakthrough.

His landscapes eventually came to encompass the Bavarian Oberland, as well as his native Northern Germany.

== Sources ==
- Hyacinth Holland (1906). "Langko, Dietrich". Allgemeine Deutsche Biographie (in German). Vol. 51. Leipzig: Duncker & Humblot. pp. 589–590.
- Barbara Eschenburg (1982). "Langko, Dietrich". Neue Deutsche Biographie (in German). Vol. 13. Berlin: Duncker & Humblot. pp. 606–607. (full text online).
- Eberhard Ruhmer (Ed.): Die Münchener Maler im 19. Jahrhundert. Bruckmann, Munich 1983, ISBN 3-7654-1896-X.
- Siegfried Wichmann: Die Münchner Landschaftsmaler im 19. Jahrhundert. Meister, Schüler, Themen. Seehamer, Weyarn 1996, ISBN 3-929626-72-1.
