= Eduard Schleich =

Eduard Schleich may refer to:

- Eduard Schleich the Elder (1812–1874), German landscape painter
- Eduard Schleich the Younger (1853–1893), his son, also a German landscape painter
- Eduard Ritter von Schleich (1888–1947), his grandson, a German flying ace

== See also ==
- Schleich, a German company that makes toy figurines and accessories
- Schleich, Germany, a city in the Trier-Saarburg district
