= Ludwig Willroider =

Austrian painter (1845–1910)

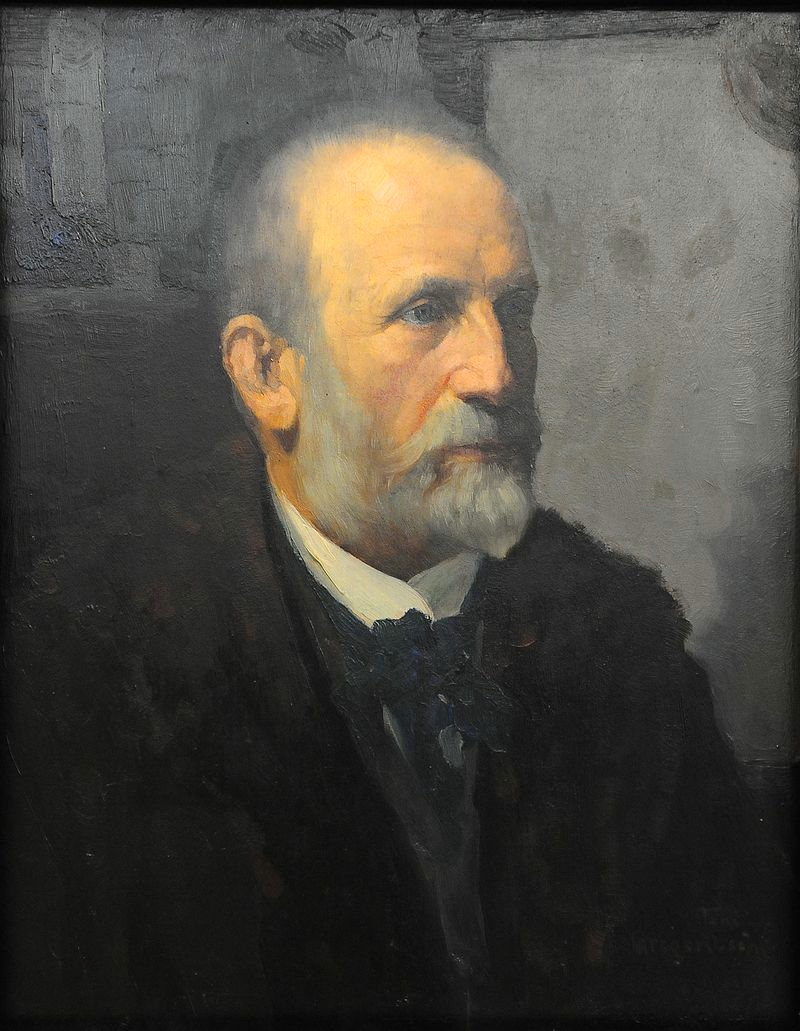
Ludwig Willroider; portrait by Anton Gregoritsch (c.1900)

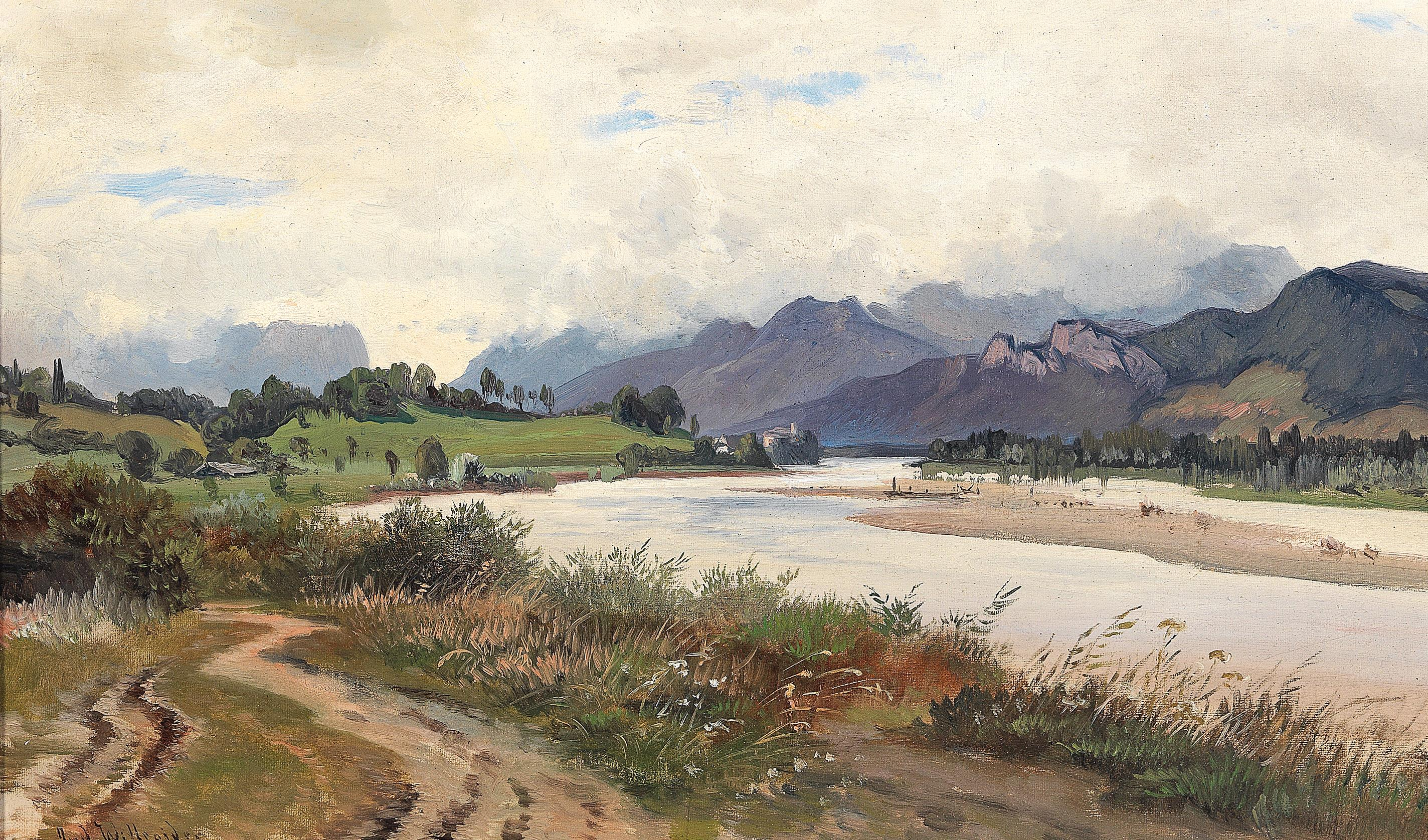
Motif from Salzburg

Ludwig Willroider (11 January 1845 – 22 May 1910) was an Austrian landscape painter and etcher.

== Biography ==
He was born in Villach as the second son of the City Architect, Josef Willroider. His older brother, Josef, was also a landscape painter. Like his brother, he began as a carpentry apprentice in his father's workshop before turning to art. He then received drawing lessons from his brother and the landscape painter, Jakob Canciani (1820–1891)

In 1866, at the age of twenty-three, he left Villach to study at the Academy of Fine Arts in Munich. There, he received training from Eduard Schleich the Elder and, although he was not accepted into his classes, from Adolf Heinrich Lier.

While there, he also took Carl Ebert as his mentor and accompanied him on painting trips. Originally from Stuttgart, Ebert was closely associated with the animal painters, Christian Mali and Anton Braith, and was one of the first in Germany to promote plein aire painting. Willroider was also able to take advantage of Ebert's studio spaces, offered to seven local painters, without charge.

He was a regular participant in exhibitions at the Glaspalast, where he received numerous medals, honors and commendations. Later, he would exhibit throughout Germany. His favorite places to paint were in Upper Bavaria, especially around the Starnberger See, also in the Isar valley and Carinthia, in Viktring. After 1886, he expanded his travels to include South Tyrol and Northern Italy. In addition to his painting excursions, he made study trips to the Netherlands in the 1860s and 70s.

In 1883, he was named an honorary member of the Academy in Munich. Three years later, he received the title of Professor from Luitpold, Prince Regent of Bavaria. After his retirement, he divided his time between Munich and the Starnberger See. He died in 1910 in Bernried am Starnberger See.

== Sources ==
- Biography by Constantin von Wurzbach, from the Biographisches Lexikon des Kaiserthums Oesterreich @ WikiSource
- Friedrich von Boetticher: Malerwerke des 19. Jahrhunderts, 1941, reprinted 1979 by H. Schmidt & C. Gunther ISBN 978-3-920843-00-1
- "Ludwig Willroider". In: Hans Vollmer (Ed.): Allgemeines Lexikon der Bildenden Künstler von der Antike bis zur Gegenwart, Vol.36: Wilhelmy–Zyzywi. E. A. Seemann, Leipzig 1947, pg.35
