= Adolph Friedrich Vollmer =

German painter

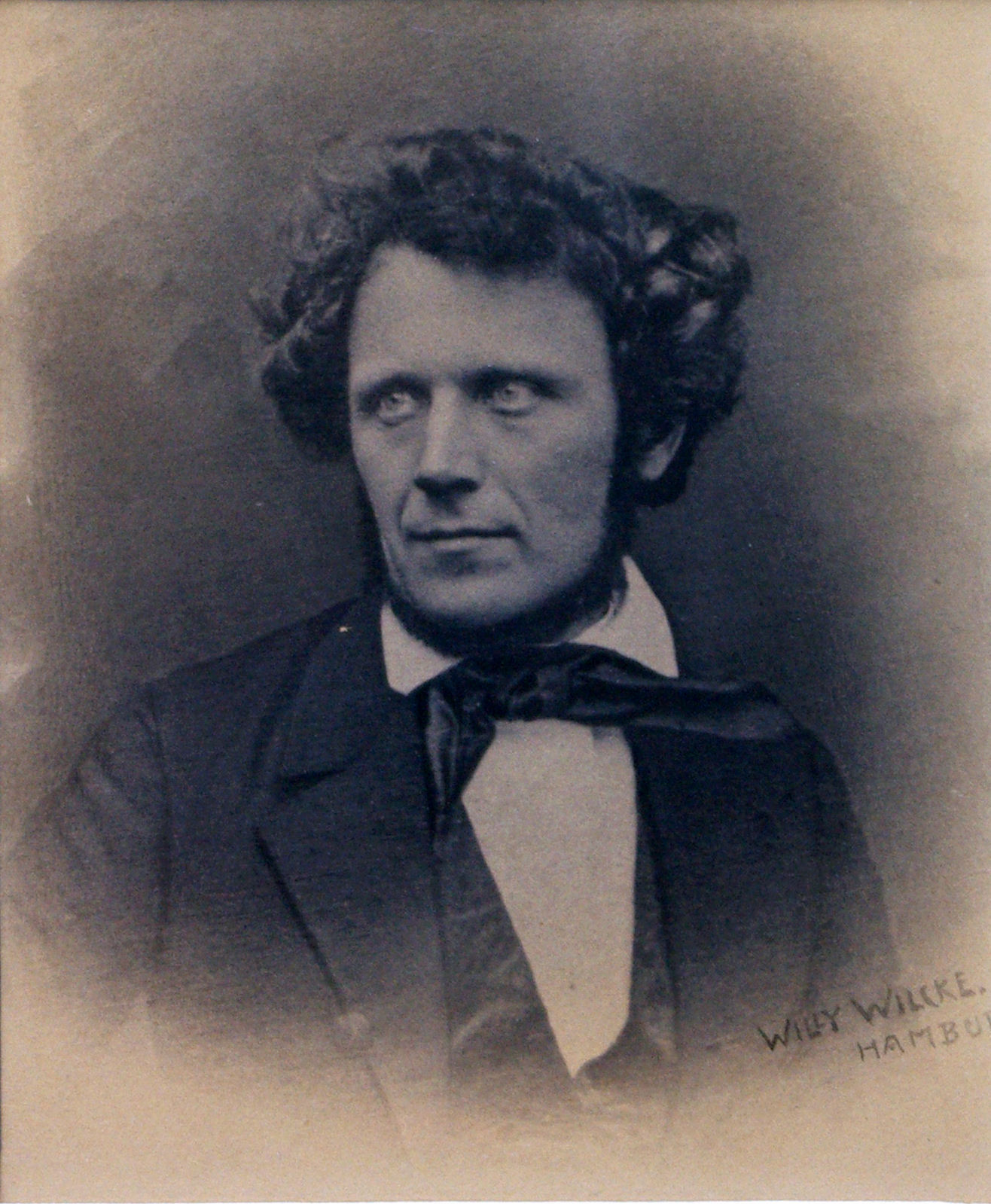
Adolph Friedrich Vollmer

Adolph Friedrich Vollmer (17 December 1806 – 12 February 1875) was a German landscape and marine painter and graphic artist. He and his contemporary, the painter Christian Morgenstern, were pioneers in Hamburg of early Realism in painting.

== Life ==
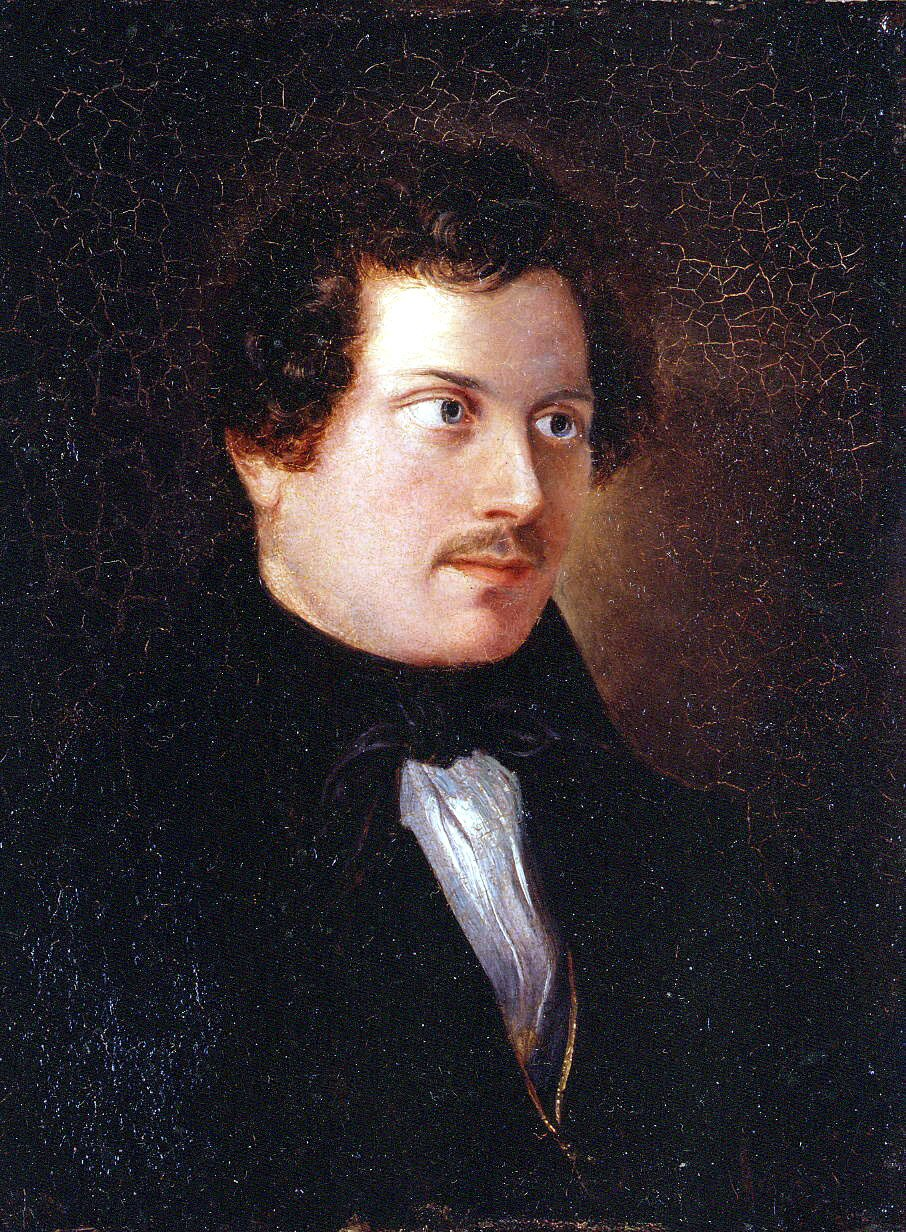
Early Self-portrait

A son of a bookkeeper to a Hamburg merchant, Vollmer grew up in humble circumstances. Determined to become a painter against the wishes of his father, he became an apprentice to the Suhr brothers who owned a graphic workshop producing panorama prints. Like Morgenstern before him, Vollmer travelled throughout Germany with one of the brothers, Cornelius Suhr, for a year and a half. In 1826 the Hamburg art dealer Ernst Harzen introduced him to Carl Friedrich von Rumohr, a wealthy aristocrat, who was a patron to many young Hamburg artists among them Morgenstern and Otto Speckter. Probably on Rumohr's advice Vollmer completed his studies under Christoffer Wilhelm Eckersberg at the Royal Danish Academy of Fine Arts in Copenhagen. He then moved to Munich from where he undertook journeys to Lake Constance, the Austrian and Swiss Alps, Venice, Le Havre and the Netherlands.

In 1839 Vollmer returned to Hamburg and settled there. He lost his eyesight in 1866 and died in Hamburg. One of his sons, Johannes Vollmer, was a prominent architect of Protestant churches; his grandson Hans Vollmer was an art historian and encyclopaedist who, for many years, edited the Thieme-Becker Künstler Lexikon.

== Work ==
Vollmer's landscapes and views of the Hamburg Harbour are neither typical veduta nor are they influenced by Romanticism; they are rather in the tradition of the great Dutch landscape painters of the 17th century, for example of Salomon van Ruysdael. In his best paintings, despite the generally small format, he succeeds through carefully balanced compositions to create a sense of depth and of space. Figures in his drawings and etchings are often minute, only millimetres in size; nevertheless, by use of very fine lines he is able to render vivid depictions of people at work and leisure.

Works of Adolph Friedrich Vollmer can be found, among other collections, at the Kunsthalle Hamburg, the Altonaer Museum in Hamburg, the Hermitage in St. Petersburg, the Statens Museum for Kunst in Copenhagen and the British Museum. The Philadelphia Museum of Art holds a complete set of his known etchings.

== Gallery ==
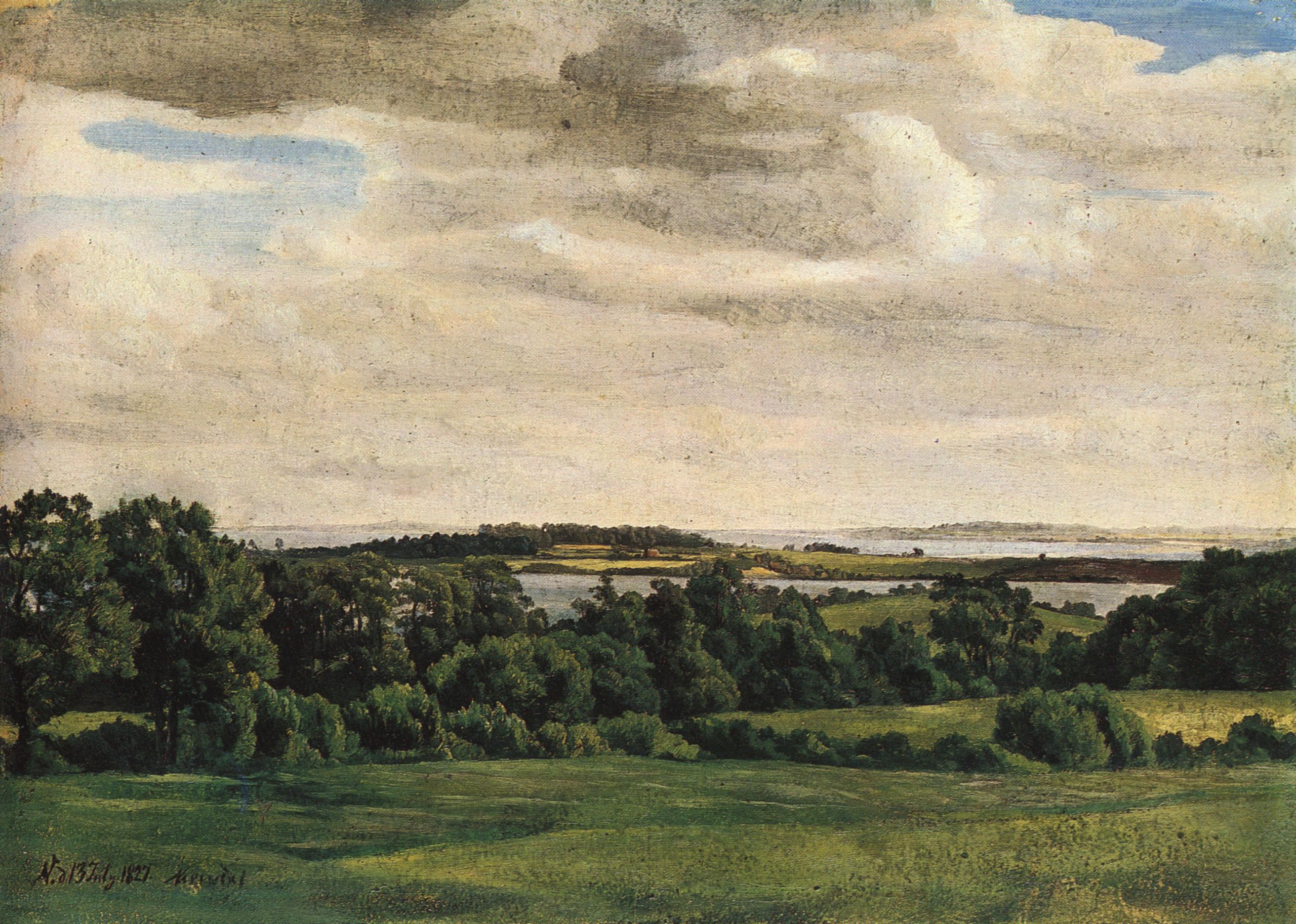
Landscape in Holstein (1827)

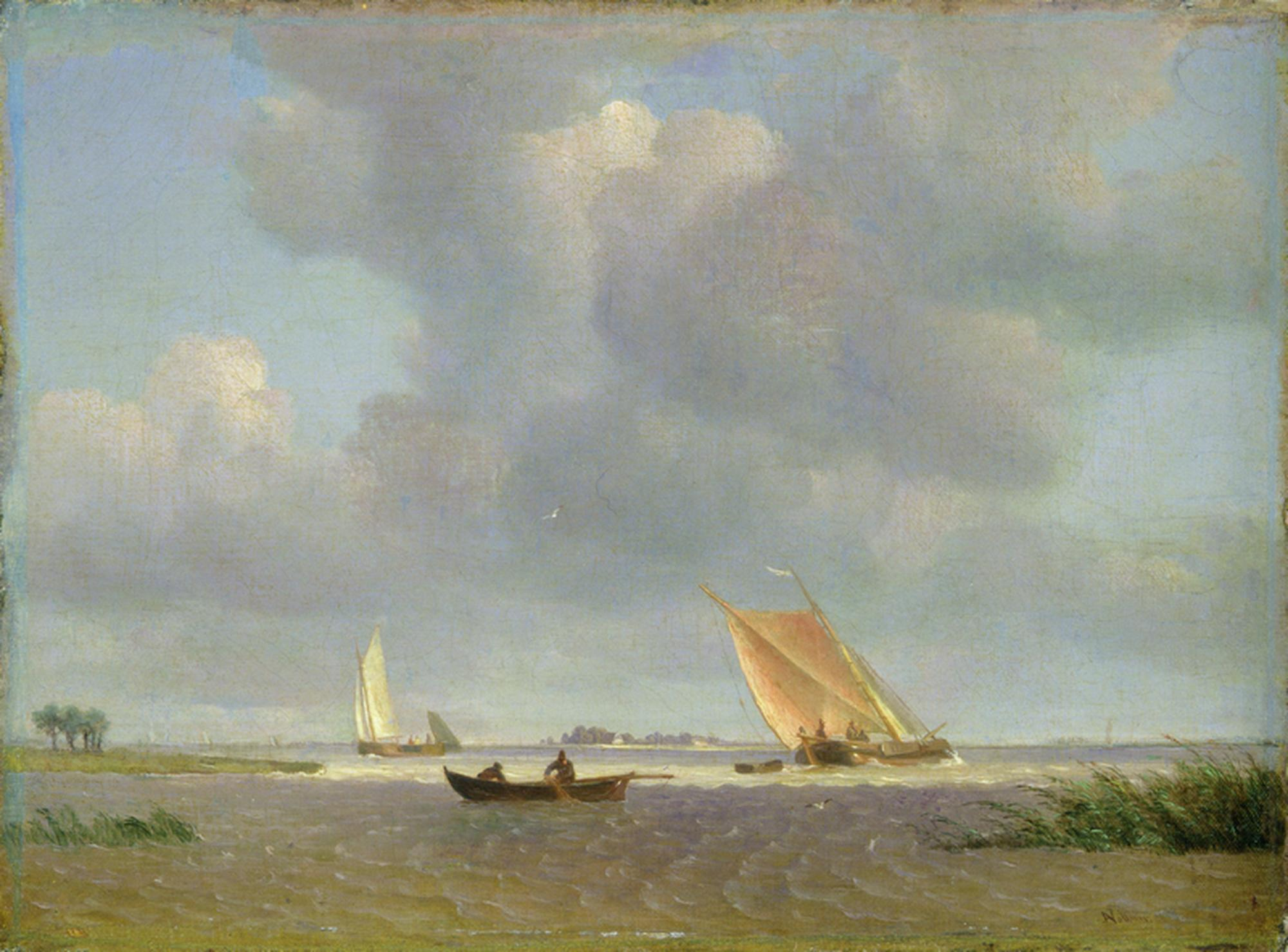
A fresh breeze on the river Elbe near Blankenese (ca. 1830)

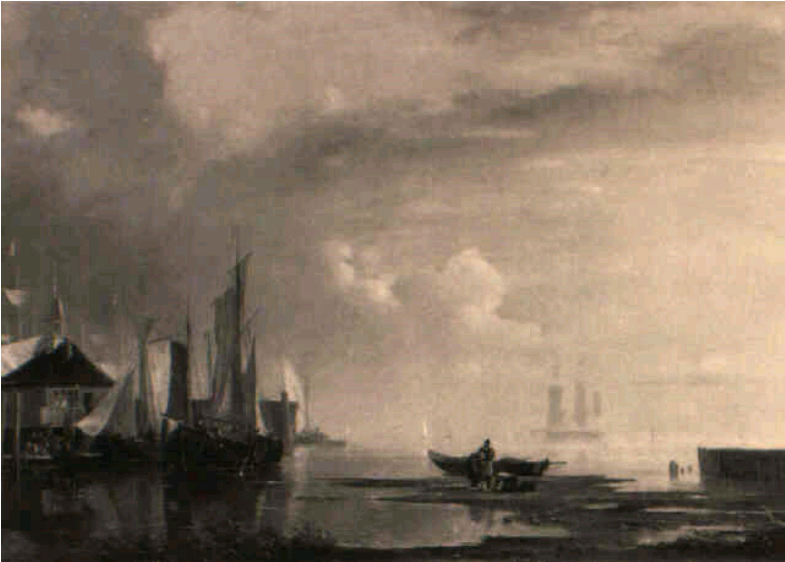
Hamburg Harbour in 1839, to the left the old Blockhouse.

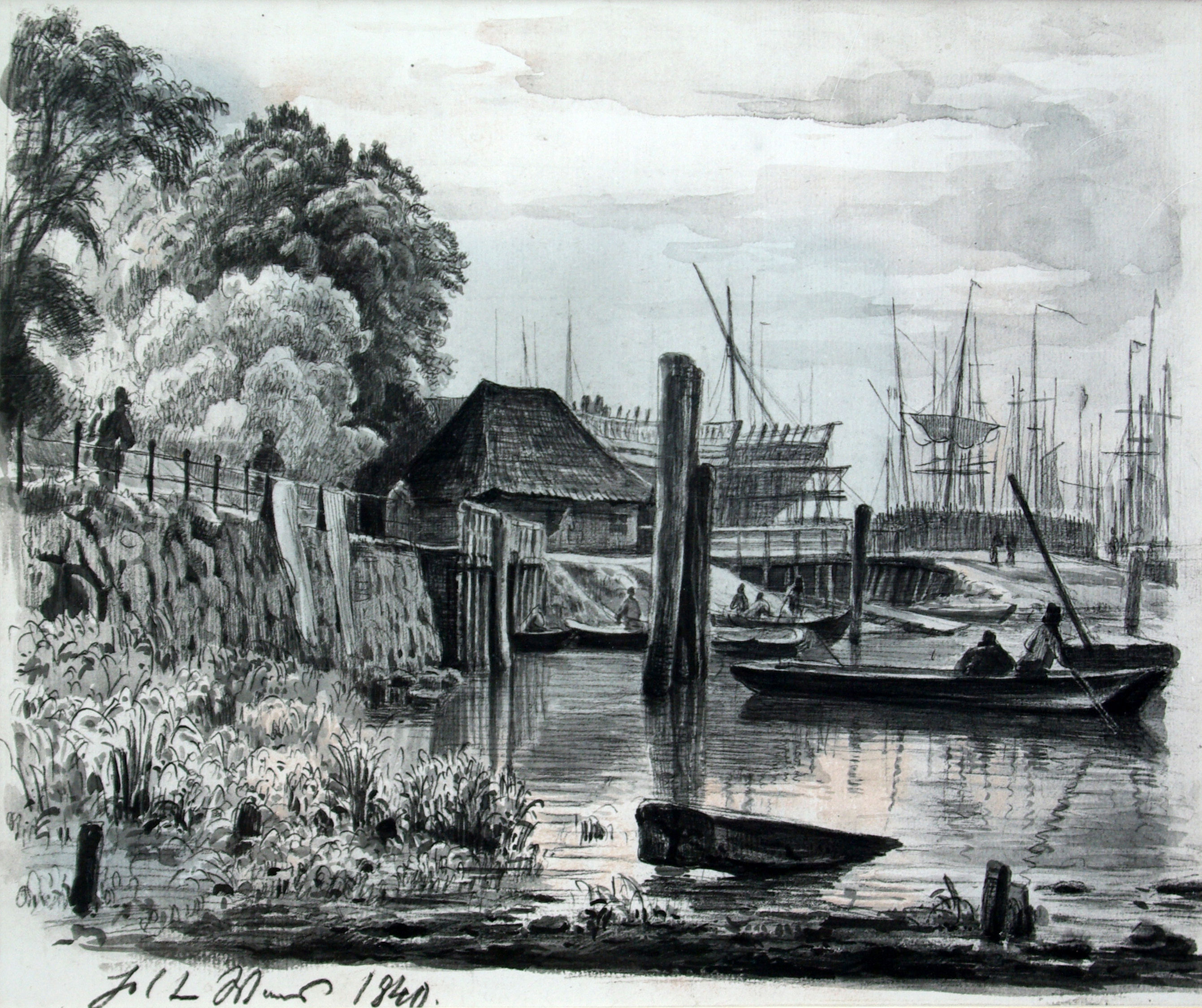
The Reiherstieg ship-yard in Hamburg in 1840.

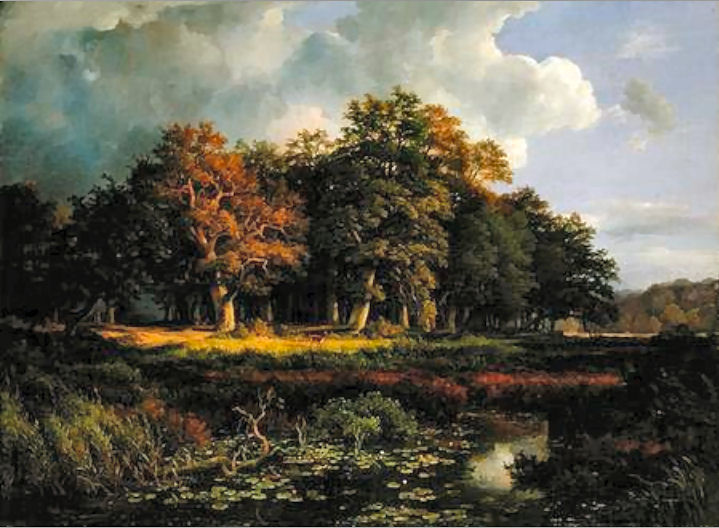
The Stangenmühlengrund in the Sachsenwald (1852)

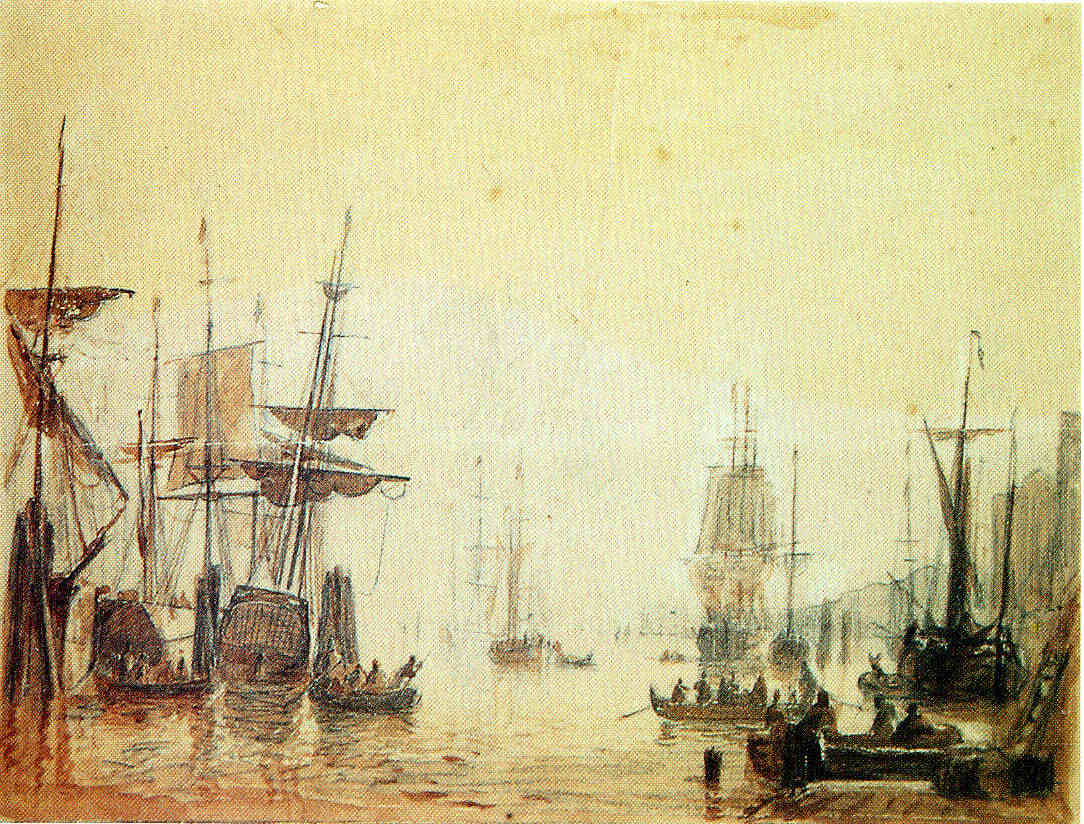
Hamburg Harbour (1840)
