= German Romanticism =

Intellectual movement in German-speaking countries

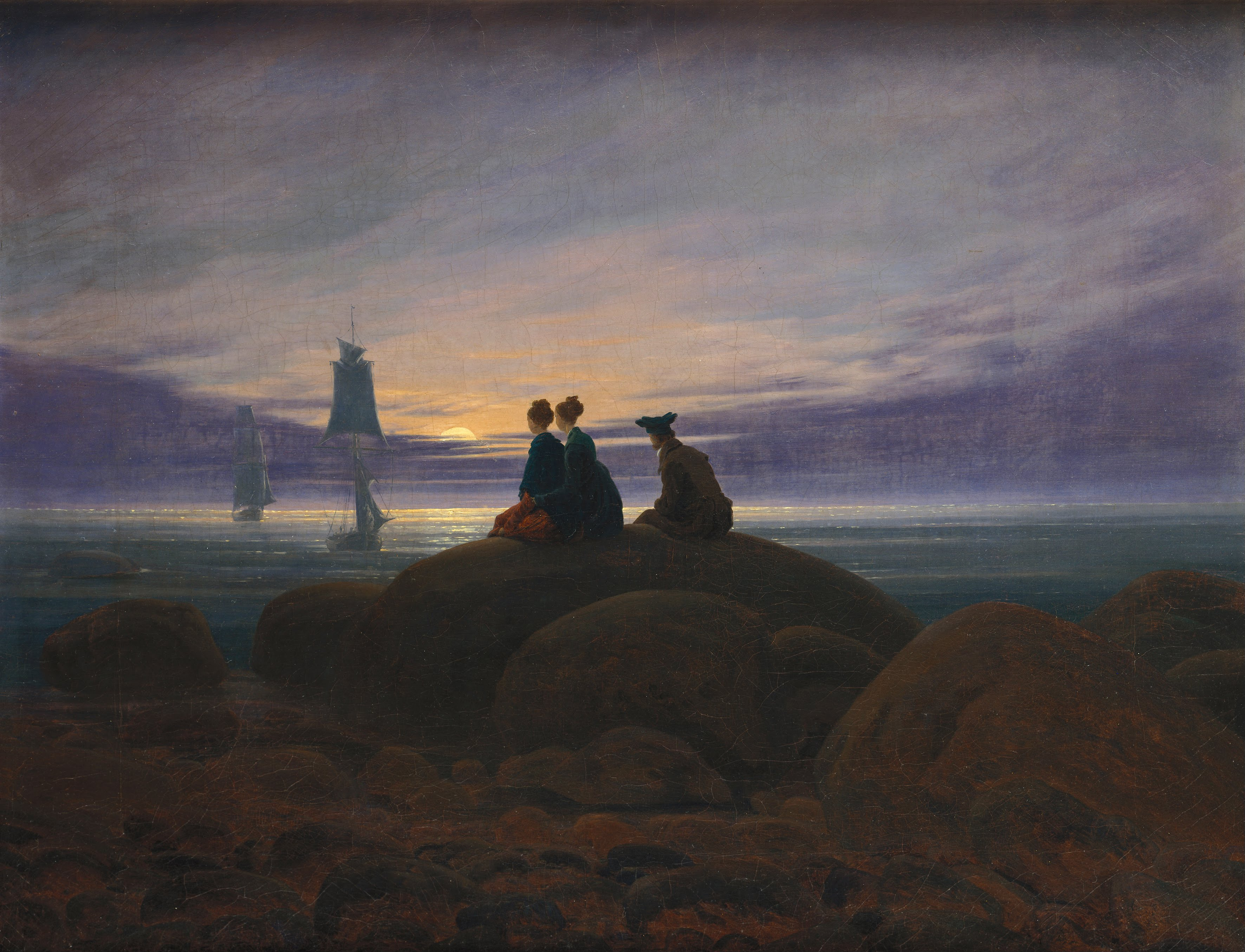
Caspar David Friedrich, (1774–1840) Moonrise by the Sea, 1822, 55x71 cm

German Romanticism (German: Deutsche Romantik) was the dominant intellectual movement of German-speaking countries in the late 18th and early 19th centuries, influencing philosophy, aesthetics, literature, and criticism. Compared to English Romanticism, the German variety developed relatively early, and, in the opening years, coincided with Weimar Classicism (1772–1805).

The early period, roughly 1797 to 1802, is referred to as Frühromantik or Jena Romanticism. The philosophers and writers central to the movement were Wilhelm Heinrich Wackenroder (1773–1798), Friedrich Wilhelm Joseph Schelling (1775–1854), Friedrich Schleiermacher (1768–1834), Karl Wilhelm Friedrich Schlegel (1772–1829), August Wilhelm Schlegel (1767–1845), Ludwig Tieck (1773–1853), and Friedrich von Hardenberg (Novalis) (1772–1801).

The early German Romantics strove to create a new synthesis of art, philosophy, and science, by viewing the Middle Ages as a simpler period of integrated culture; however, the German Romantics became aware of the tenuousness of the cultural unity they sought. Late-stage German Romanticism emphasized the tension between the daily world and the irrational and supernatural projections of creative genius. In particular, the critic Heinrich Heine criticized the tendency of the early German Romantics to look to the medieval Holy Roman Empire for a model of unity in the arts, religion, and society.

A major product of the invasion and military occupation, beginning under the French First Republic and continuing under Napoleon, of the traditionally politically and religiously balkanized Germanosphere was the development of Pan-Germanism and romantic nationalism, which eventually created the German Confederation of 1815 and the German Empire of 1871. German Romanticism was accordingly rooted in both the quest, epitomized by Baron Joseph von Laßberg, Johann Martin Lappenberg, and the Brothers Grimm, for decolonisation, a distinctly German culture, and national identity, and hostility to certain ideas of The Enlightenment, the French Revolution, the Reign of Terror, and the First French Empire. Several major Romantic thinkers, especially Ernst Moritz Arndt, Johann Gottlieb Fichte, Heinrich von Kleist, and Friedrich Schleiermacher, embraced many elements of Counter-Enlightenment political philosophy and were hostile to Classical liberalism, rationalism, neoclassicism, and cosmopolitanism, Other Romantics, like Heine, were fully in support of the German Revolutions of 1848.

At the same time, German Romanticism was also influential on the political left; Karl Marx and Friedrich Engels alluded to Romantic critiques of capitalism in The Communist Manifesto, describing "feudal socialism" as "half lamentation, half lampoon; half an echo of the past, half menace of the future; at times, by its bitter, witty and incisive criticism, striking the bourgeoisie to the very heart’s core; but always ludicrous in its effect, through total incapacity to comprehend the march of modern history." In The German Ideology, Marx argued that Communist society would allow for greater self-development, in line with Romantic ideals of Bildung:

For as soon as the distribution of labour comes into being, each man has a particular, exclusive sphere of activity, which is forced upon him and from which he cannot escape. He is a hunter, a fisherman, a herdsman, or a critical critic, and must remain so if he does not want to lose his means of livelihood; while in communist society, where nobody has one exclusive sphere of activity but each can become accomplished in any branch he wishes, society regulates the general production and thus makes it possible for me to do one thing today and another tomorrow, to hunt in the morning, fish in the afternoon, rear cattle in the evening, criticise after dinner, just as I have a mind, without ever becoming hunter, fisherman, herdsman or critic. This fixation of social activity, this consolidation of what we ourselves produce into an objective power above us, growing out of our control, thwarting our expectations, bringing to naught our calculations, is one of the chief factors in historical development up till now.

== Literary figures ==
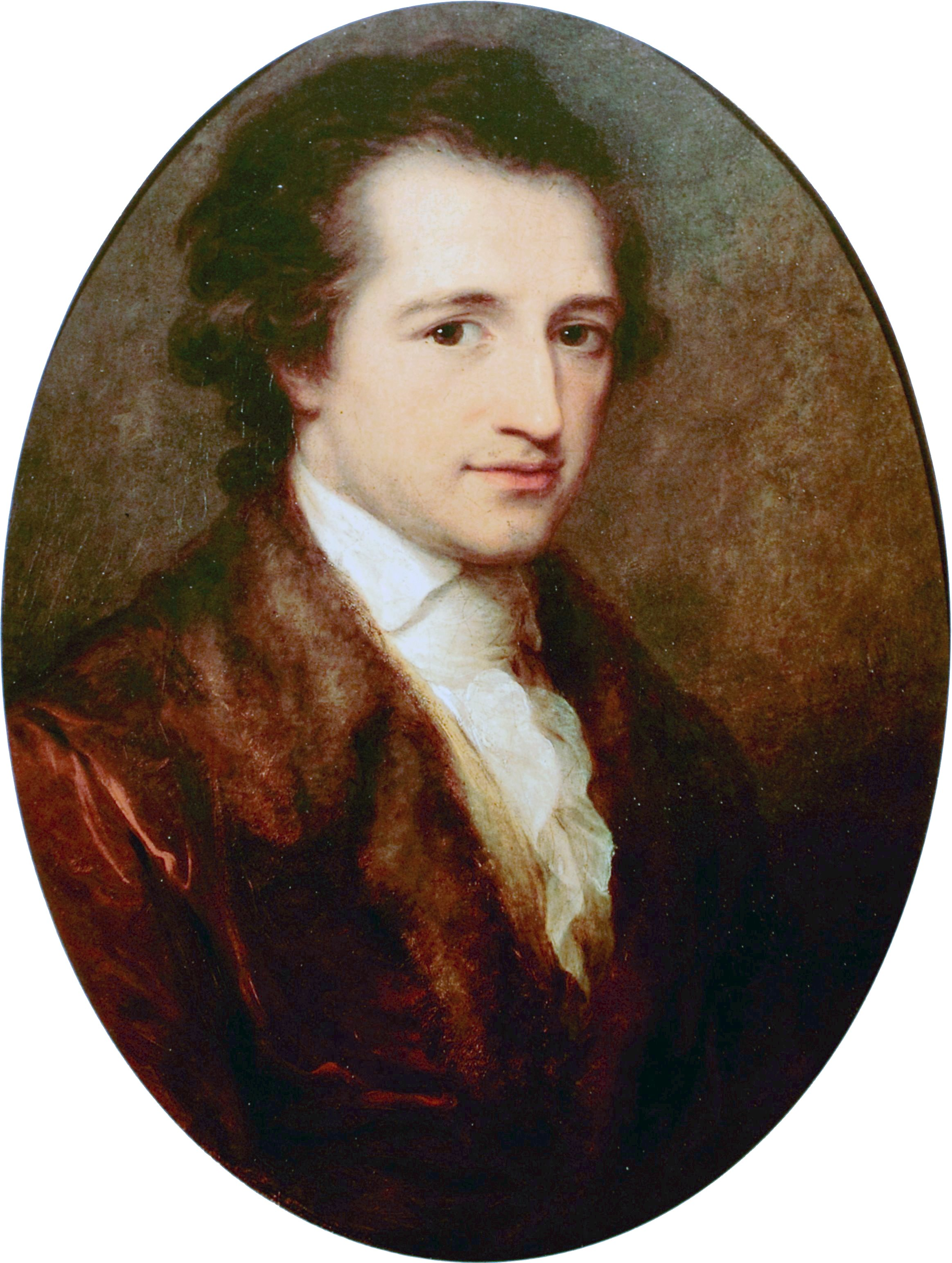
Angelica Kauffman, Johann Wolfgang von Goethe, 1787

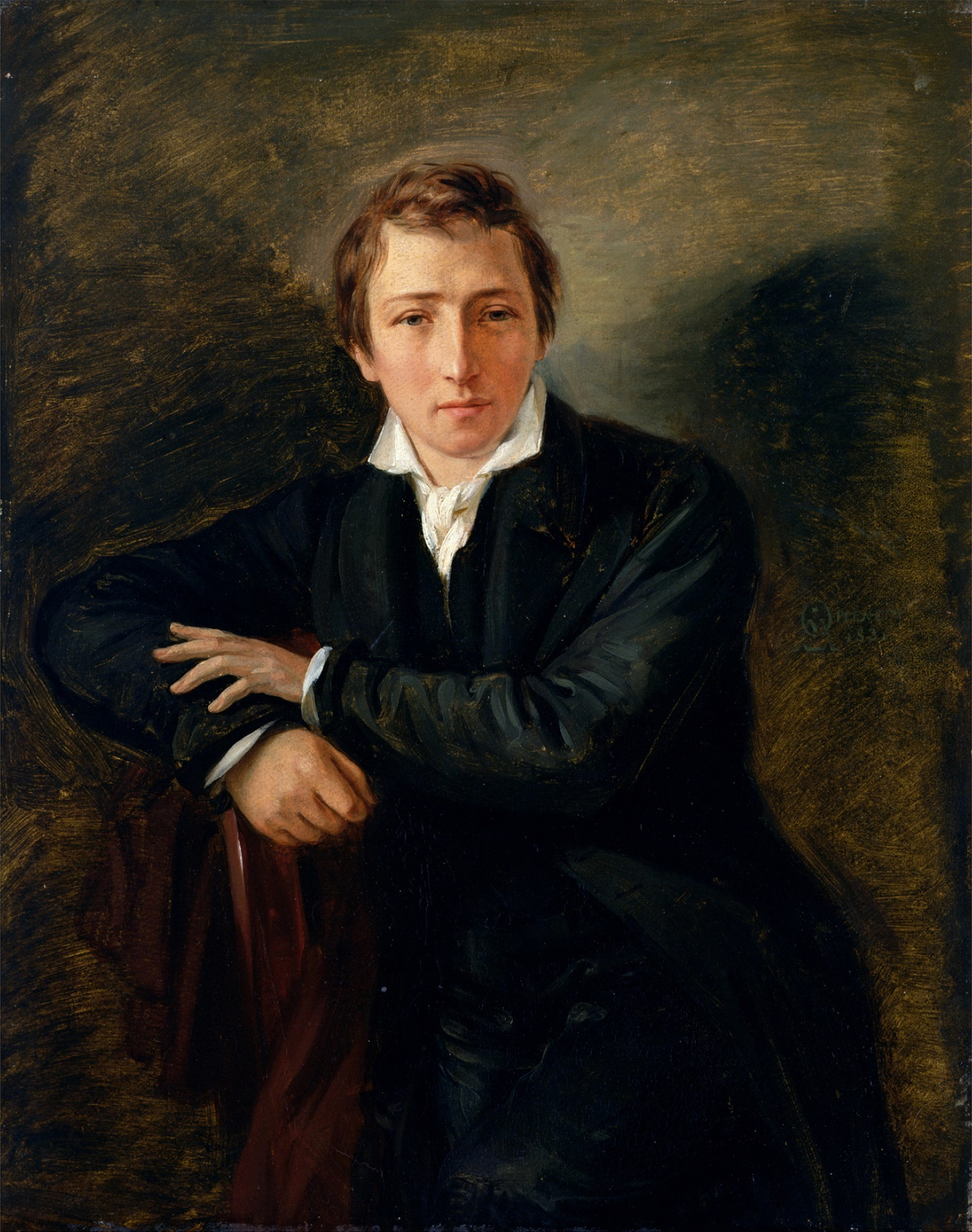
Moritz Daniel Oppenheim Heinrich Heine, 1831, Kunsthalle Hamburg

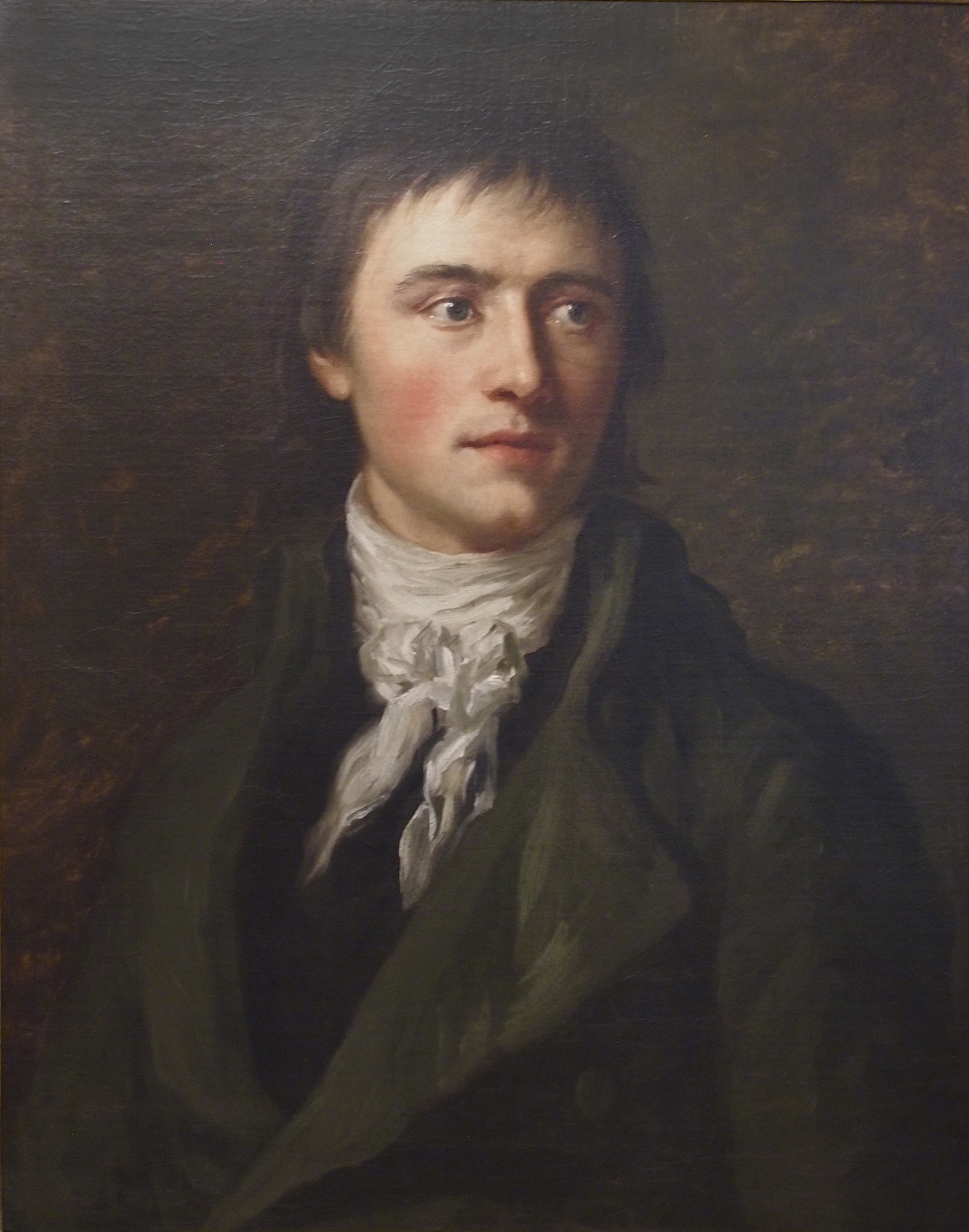
Anton Graff Heinrich von Kleist, c. 1808

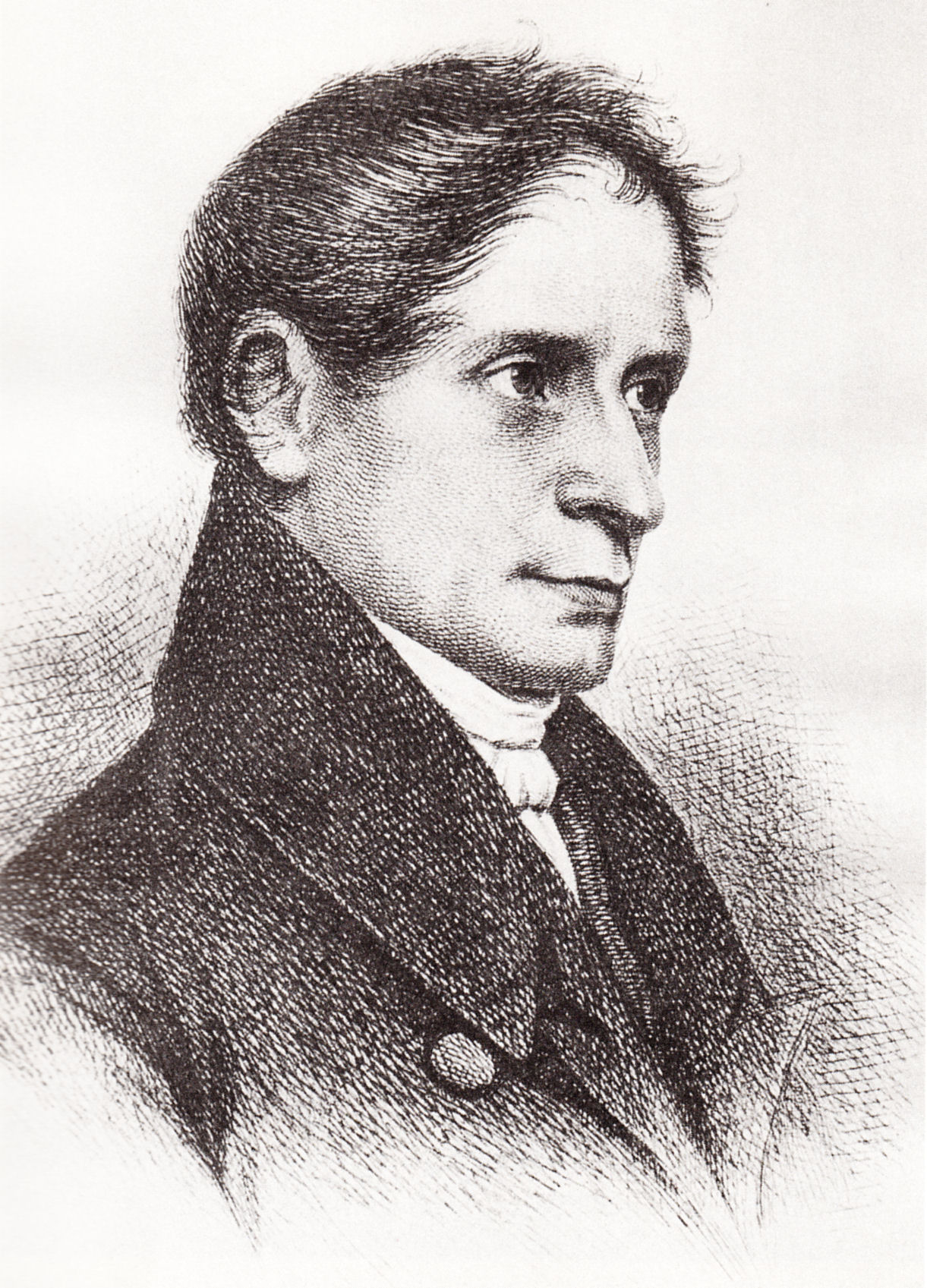
Joseph von Eichendorff

- Ernst Moritz Arndt
- Achim von Arnim
- Bettina von Arnim
- Clemens Brentano
- Adelbert von Chamisso
- Joseph von Eichendorff
- Friedrich de la Motte Fouqué
- Johann Wolfgang von Goethe
- Heinrich Heine
- E. T. A. Hoffmann
- Friedrich Hölderlin
- Jean Paul
- Heinrich von Kleist
- Sophie Mereau
- Eduard Mörike
- Novalis (Friedrich von Hardenberg)
- Friedrich Schiller
- Dorothea Schlegel
- Friedrich Schlegel
- August Wilhelm Schlegel
- Ernst Schulze
- Gustav Schwab
- Ludwig Tieck
- Ludwig Uhland
- Wilhelm Heinrich Wackenroder

== Philosophical figures ==
- Joseph von Eichendorff
- Johann Gottlieb Fichte
- Johann Wolfgang von Goethe
- Johann Gottfried Herder
- Georg Wilhelm Friedrich Hegel
- August Ludwig Hülsen
- Friedrich Ludwig Jahn
- Adam Müller
- Novalis (Friedrich von Hardenberg)
- Friedrich Wilhelm Joseph Schelling
- Karoline Schelling
- Friedrich Schlegel
- Friedrich Schleiermacher
- Karl Wilhelm Ferdinand Solger
- Ludwig Uhland

== Composers ==
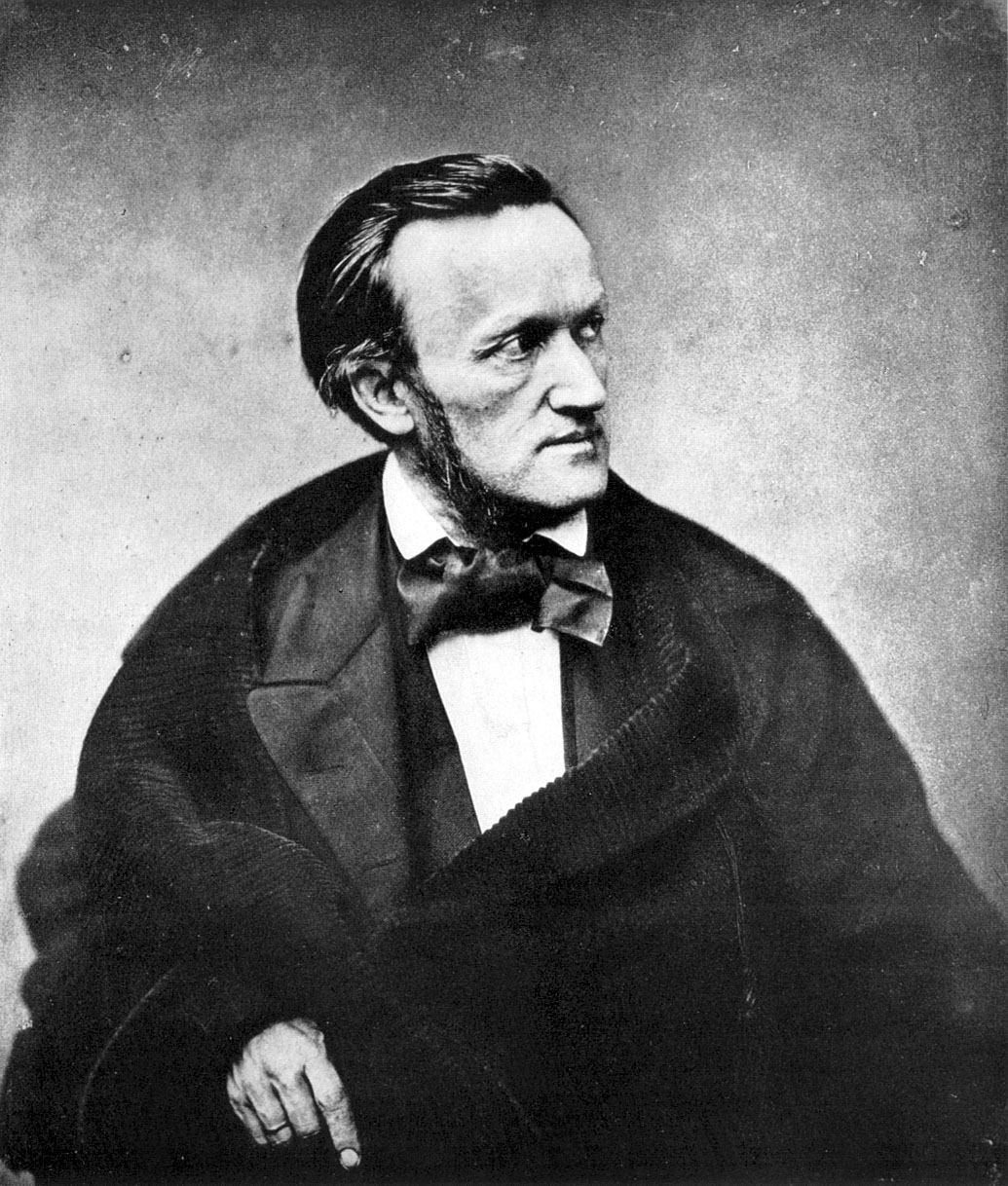
Richard Wagner, 1860

- Ludwig van Beethoven. In his earlier works, Beethoven was a Classicist in the traditions of Mozart and Haydn (his tutor), but his Middle Period, beginning with his third symphony (the 'Eroica'), bridges the worlds of Classical and Romantic music. Because Beethoven wrote some of his greatest music after he became totally deaf, he embodies the Romantic ideal of the tragic artist who defies all odds to conquer his own fate. His later works portray the triumph of the human spirit, most notably his 'Choral' Symphony No. 9; the stirring 'Ode to Joy' from this symphony has been adopted as the anthem of the European Union.
- Johannes Brahms. His works are cast in the formal moulds of Classicism; he had a profound reverence for Beethoven. Brahms was also attracted to the exoticism of Hungarian folk music, and used it in such pieces as his famous Hungarian Dances, the final movement of his Violin Concerto, and the 'Rondo alla zingarese' from his Piano Quartet No. 1, op. 25, in G minor.
- Franz Liszt. Liszt was by nationality a Hungarian, but nevertheless he spent many years in Germany, and his first language was German. Credited as the inventor of the tone poem. In his old age, Liszt adopted a more dissonant, ominous flavour, characteristic works being 'la Lugubre Gondola' and 'Die Zelle in Nonnenwerth'—predating Impressionism and 20th-century atonality.
- Felix Mendelssohn Bartholdy. A composer of the Early Romantic period, together with such figures as Schumann, Chopin and Liszt. One of the persons responsible for reviving interest in the somewhat neglected music of Johann Sebastian Bach.
- Franz Schubert. Like Beethoven, his early works like his symphonies, string quartets, and piano sonatas were in the Viennese classical traditions of Mozart and Haydn. His later body of work consists mainly of song cycles and German Lieder set to poems by his contemporaries, many of which are among the most common repertoire in those categories performed today.
- Robert Schumann. His works recall the nostalgia of lost childhood innocence, first love, and the magnificence of the German countryside. As an influential critic, he played a major role in discovering new talents, among them Chopin and Brahms.
- Richard Wagner. The most famous composer of German opera; was an exponent of Leitmotif. One of the main figures in the so-called War of the Romantics.
- Carl Maria von Weber. Perhaps the very first of Romantic musicians, if we exclude Beethoven and Schubert, in the sense that Weber was the first major composer to emerge wholly as a product of the Romantic school, as contrasted with Beethoven, who had started off as a Classicist. The emotional intensity and supernatural, folklore-based themes in his operas presented a radical break from the Neoclassical traditions of that time.

== Visual artists ==
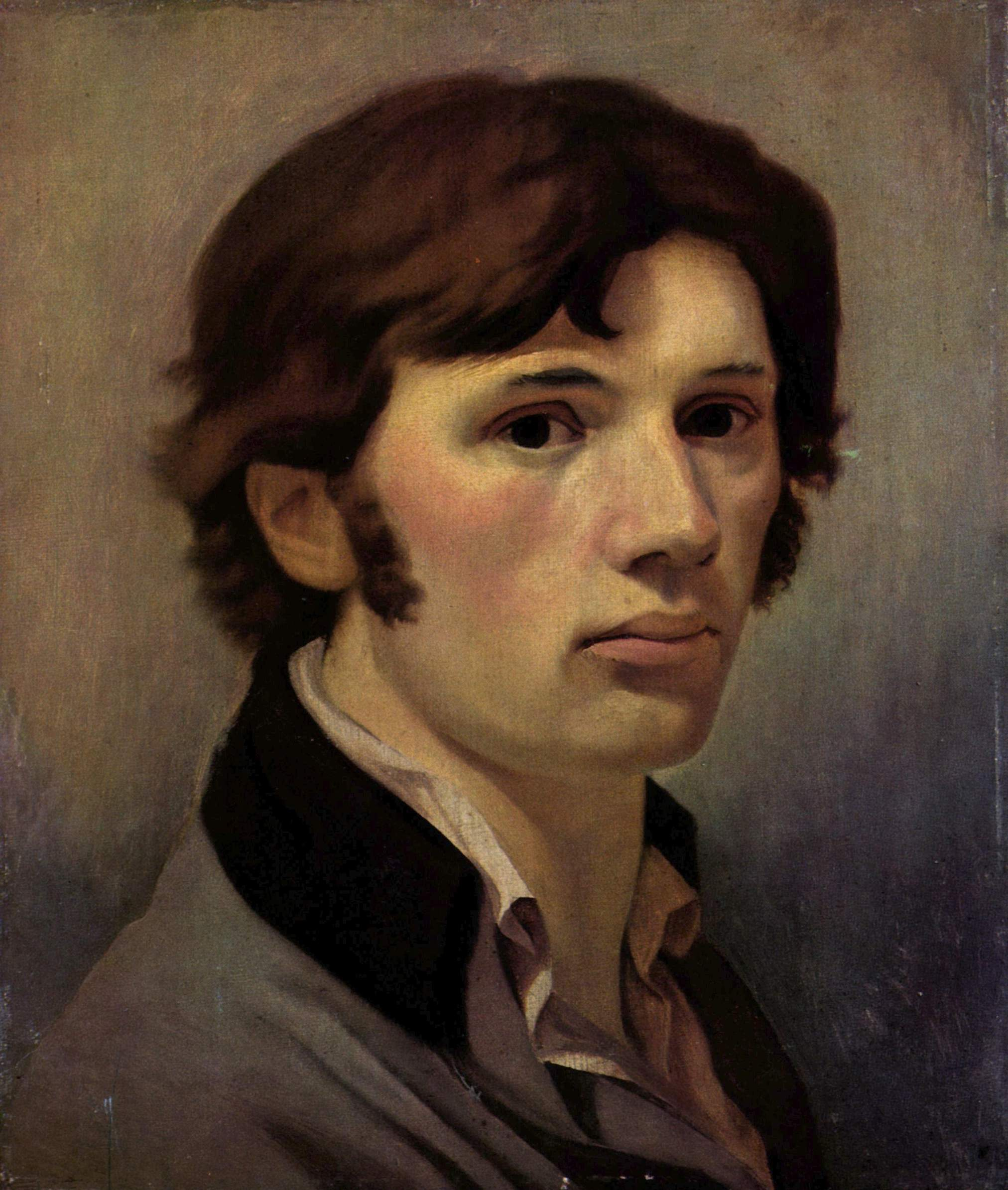
Philipp Otto Runge, Self Portrait, 1802–1803, Kunsthalle, Hamburg

- Carl Blechen
- Carl Gustav Carus
- Johan Christian Dahl
- Christian Ezdorf
- Caspar David Friedrich
- Jacob Philipp Hackert
- Julius Hubner
- Otto Reinhold Jacobi
- Joseph Anton Koch
- Gerhard von Kügelgen
- Adrian Ludwig Richter
- Carl Rottmann
- Philipp Otto Runge
- Friedrich Wilhelm Schadow
- Carl Spitzweg
- Eberhard Wächter
- Anton Georg Zwengauer

== Architecture ==
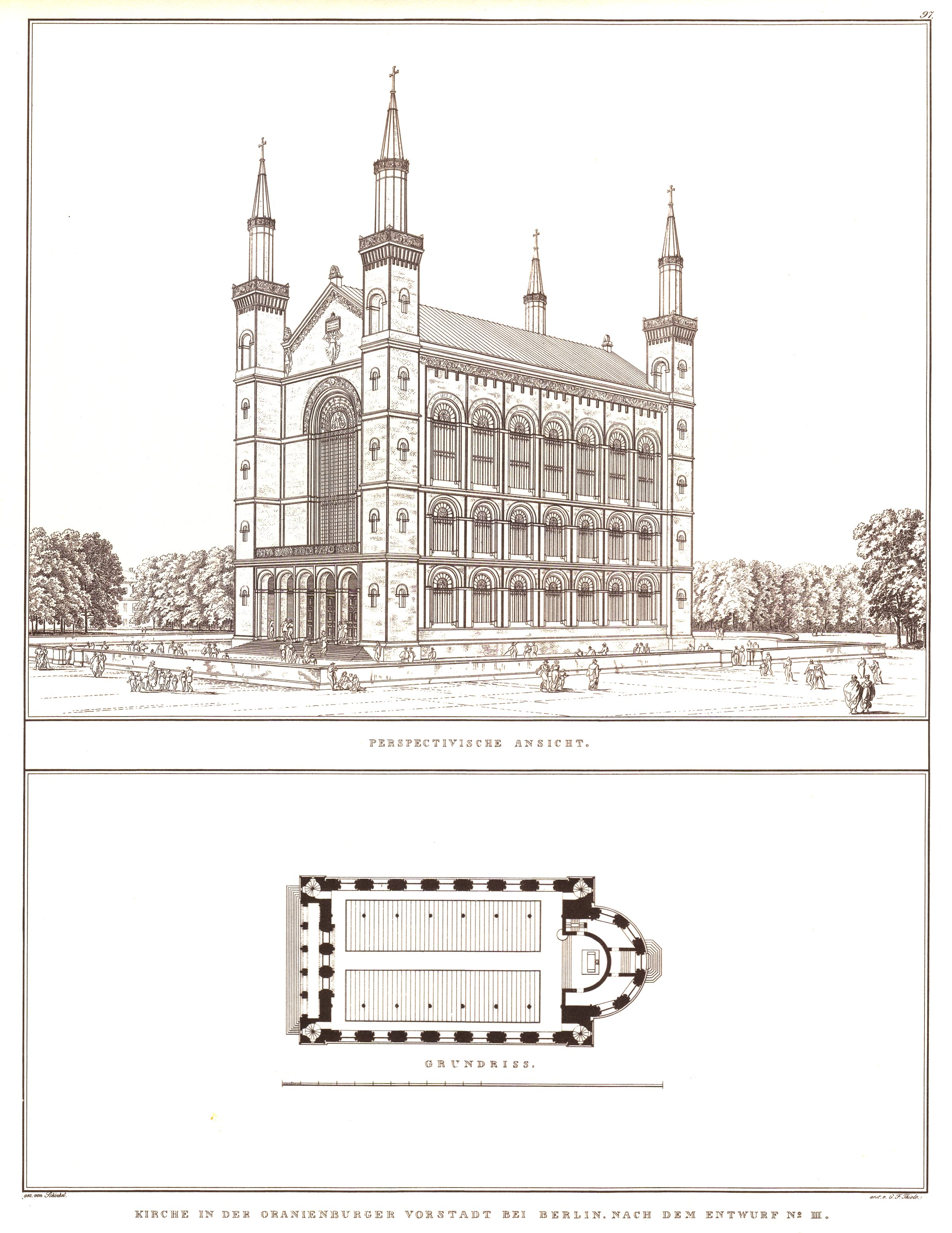
Karl Friedrich Schinkel. Project for church in Oranienburger Vorstadt, Berlin

- Karl Friedrich Schinkel

== See also ==
- Deutsches Romantik-Museum
- Athenaeum
- Berlin Romanticism
- Culture of Germany
- Germanophile
- Heidelberg Romanticism
- List of Austrian intellectual traditions
- List of German-language philosophers
- Philosophy of culture
- Political romanticism
- Prussian virtues
- Sturm und Drang
