= Hans Vollmer =

German art historian and encyclopedist

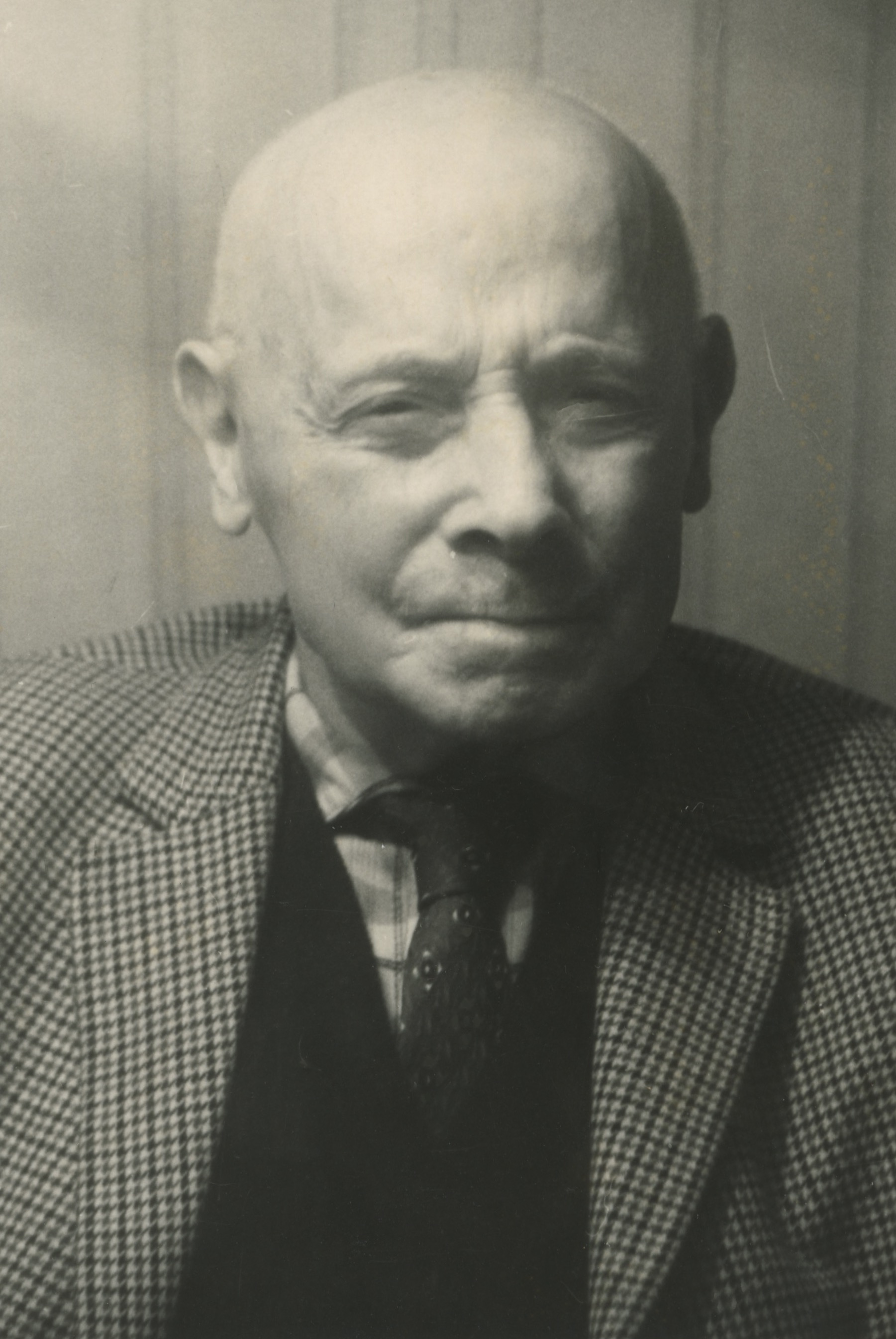
Prof. Hans Vollmer 1967

Hans Vollmer (16 November 1878 – 15 February 1969) was a German art historian and encyclopedist.

== Life ==
His father was the architect Johannes Vollmer (1845-1920), his grandfather the Hamburg marine painter and graphic artist Adolph Friedrich Vollmer (1806–1875). He was the older brother of the painter and sculptor Erwin Vollmer (1884–1973).

Vollmer studied art history, history and philosophy in Berlin and Munich. In 1906 he was awarded a doctorate under Heinrich Wölfflin in Berlin with a thesis on Schwäbische Monumentalbrunnen von der Gotik bis zum Klassizismus (Swabian monumental fountains from the Gothic to Classicism).

Since April 1, 1907 he was employed in the editorial office of the Thieme-Becker: Allgemeines Lexikon der bildenden Künstler von der Antike bis zur Gegenwart (English: General Dictionary of Artists from Antiquity to the Present) at the publishing house E. A. Seemann in Leipzig; in 1923 he took over the editorial management of the Encyclopedia. Since then he was the main contributor, supported by a small editorial staff, until the completion of the 37-volume work in 1950, after which he began working on the additions for the 20th century. The General Encyclopedia of Visual Artists of the XXth Century appeared in six volumes from 1953 to 1962. He dictated a total of 47,229 artist biographies to his secretary Claire Möbius, who also worked as a research assistant, on the basis of notes which he excerpted predominately in the Deutsche Bücherei in Leipzig; 15 to 20 typewritten pages were produced daily. In 1952 he was appointed professor. In recognition of his work Vollmer received the Patriotic Order of Merit in silver of the German Democratic Republic in 1957.

On 1 January 1964 Vollmer retired after 57 years of work for the Künstlerlexikon. He died in Leipzig at age 90.

== Publications ==
- A list of Hans Vollmer's writings is published in: Magdalena George (ed.): Festschrift Hans Vollmer., Leipzig 1957, p. 279-283.
- Schwäbische Monumentalbrunnen. (Kunstgeschichtliche Studien, issue 1). Ebering, Berlin 1906.
- Kunstgeschichtliches Wörterbuch. (Teubners kleine Fachwörterbücher 13). Teubner, Leipzig 1928.

== Literature ==
- Magdalena George (ed.): Festschrift Hans Vollmer. Aus Anlass seiner fünfzigjährigen Tätigkeit als Mitarbeiter und Herausgeber des Thieme-Becker. VEB E. A. Seemann Verlag, Leipzig 1957 (with a list of Hans Vollmer's publications; online
- Alfred Langer: Kunstliteratur und Reproduktion. 125 Jahre Seemann-Verlag im Dienste der Erforschung und Verbreitung der Kunst. E. A. Seemann, Leipzig 1983, (with picture).
