= Eduard Schleich the Younger =

German landscape painter

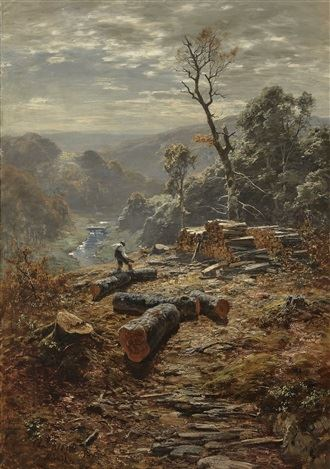
Forest Landscape with Woodworker

Eduard Schleich, known as The Younger (15 February 1853, in Munich – 28 October 1893, in Munich) was a German landscape painter.

== Biography ==
His father, Eduard (now known as "The Elder"), was a well known landscape painter. He attended Latin school as well as the usual public schools, and completed his primary education in 1872. During this time, he was already a student of Julius Zimmermann.

After receiving his Abitur, his father sent him to the Technical University of Munich, where it was intended that he would become an architect, because, for reasons that are not clear, his father did not want him to become an artist. He did well with the art-related subjects, but The technical subjects proved to be too difficult for him, so he and his father came to an understanding. First, he finished learning the basics of painting at home, then went to study with Joseph Wenglein.

He decided to work as a landscape painter, so his father's influence was significant, although he gave more attention to staffage. He also practiced more plein aire painting. Toward the end of his short life, he turned to Impressionism.

In the fall of 1891, he developed an unspecified mental illness, and died two years later in a psychiatric hospital.

His son was the flying ace and military officer, Eduard Ritter von Schleich.
