= Christian Ernst Bernhard Morgenstern =

German painter

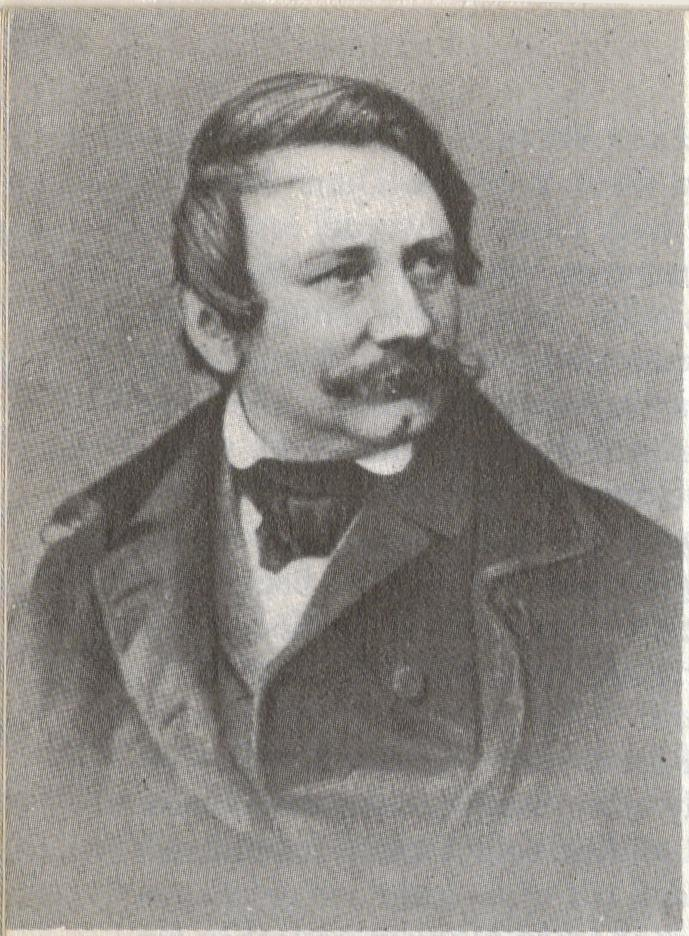
Christian Ernst Bernhard Morgenstern

Christian Ernst Bernhard Morgenstern (29 September 1805 – 27 February 1867) was a German landscape painter. Morgenstern is regarded as one of the pioneers in Germany of early Realism in painting. He gained this reputation in Hamburg 1826-1829 together with his contemporary Adolph Friedrich Vollmer while both were still studying; from 1830 onwards, Morgenstern, together with Friedrich Wasmann, Johan Christian Dahl and Adolph Menzel, introduced Munich to Realist painting.

== Life ==
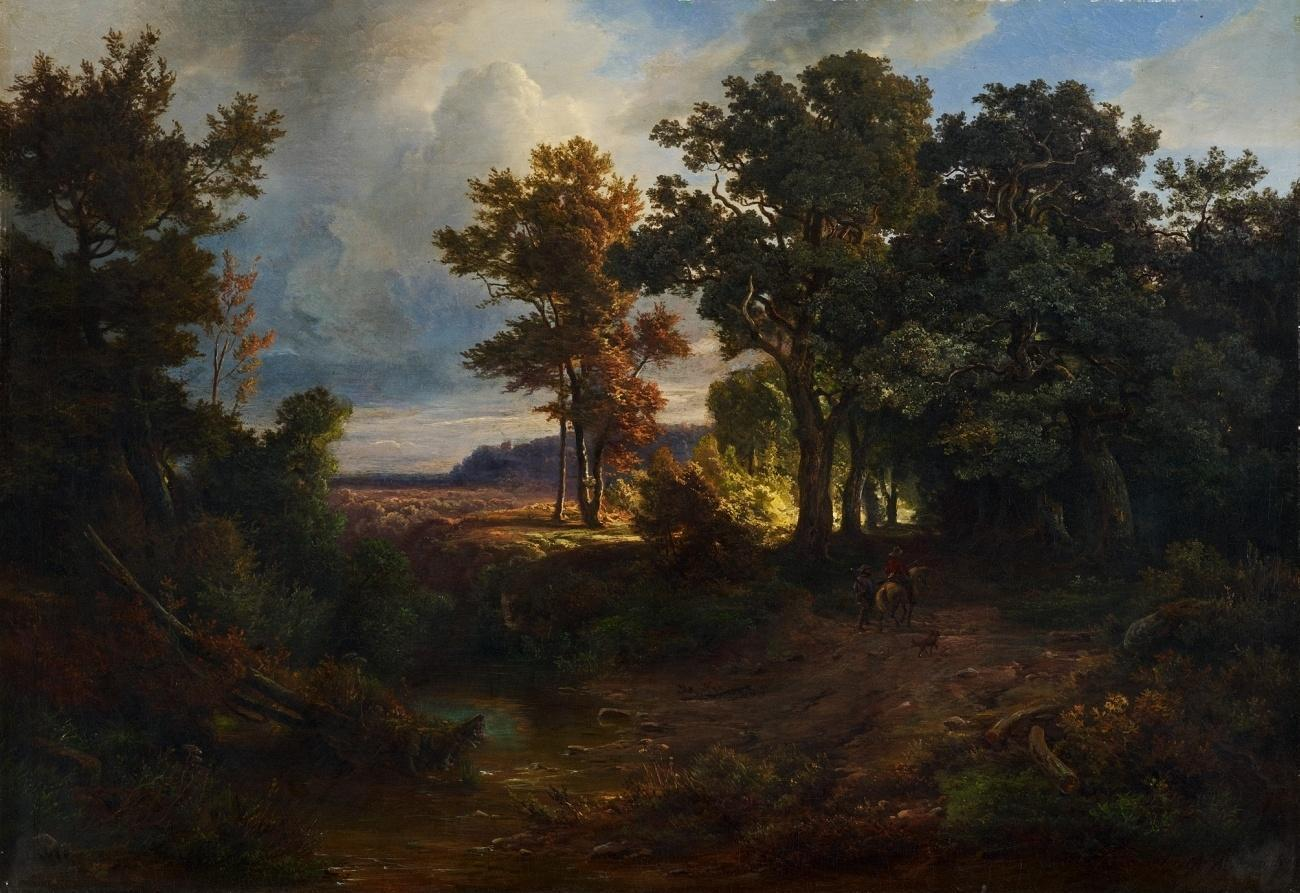
Landschaft mit Waldweg und Reiter or Landscape with forest path and rider (1849)

Morgenstern was born in Hamburg as one of six children to a painter of miniatures, Johann Heinrich Morgenstern (1769–1813). After the early death of his father he was placed as an apprentice in the graphic workshop of the brothers Suhr. Cornelius Suhr took the young Morgenstern as his servant on a two-year journey through Germany to publicise the panorama prints which the brothers Suhr produced. 1822 followed another long journey to St. Petersburg, where they stayed for a year and to Moscow. On their return to Hamburg Morgenstern succeeded in leaving Suhr (Vollmer took his place).

He became a student of the Hamburg painter Siegfried Bendixen with whom he stayed from 1824 to 1827, then continued his studies at the Royal Danish Academy of Fine Arts in Copenhagen (1827–1828) and undertook study journeys through Sweden and Norway. Bendixen introduced him to the wealthy aristocrat and supporter of the arts, Carl Friedrich von Rumohr, patron to many young Hamburg artists, on whose estate in Holstein he spent several summers.

In 1830 Morgenstern went to Munich on Ruhmor's advice. He settled there permanently while undertaking extensive yearly study trips: for the first years through Bavaria, then in the summer of 1836 and in the following summers to the Alsace as guest of a patron of the arts.

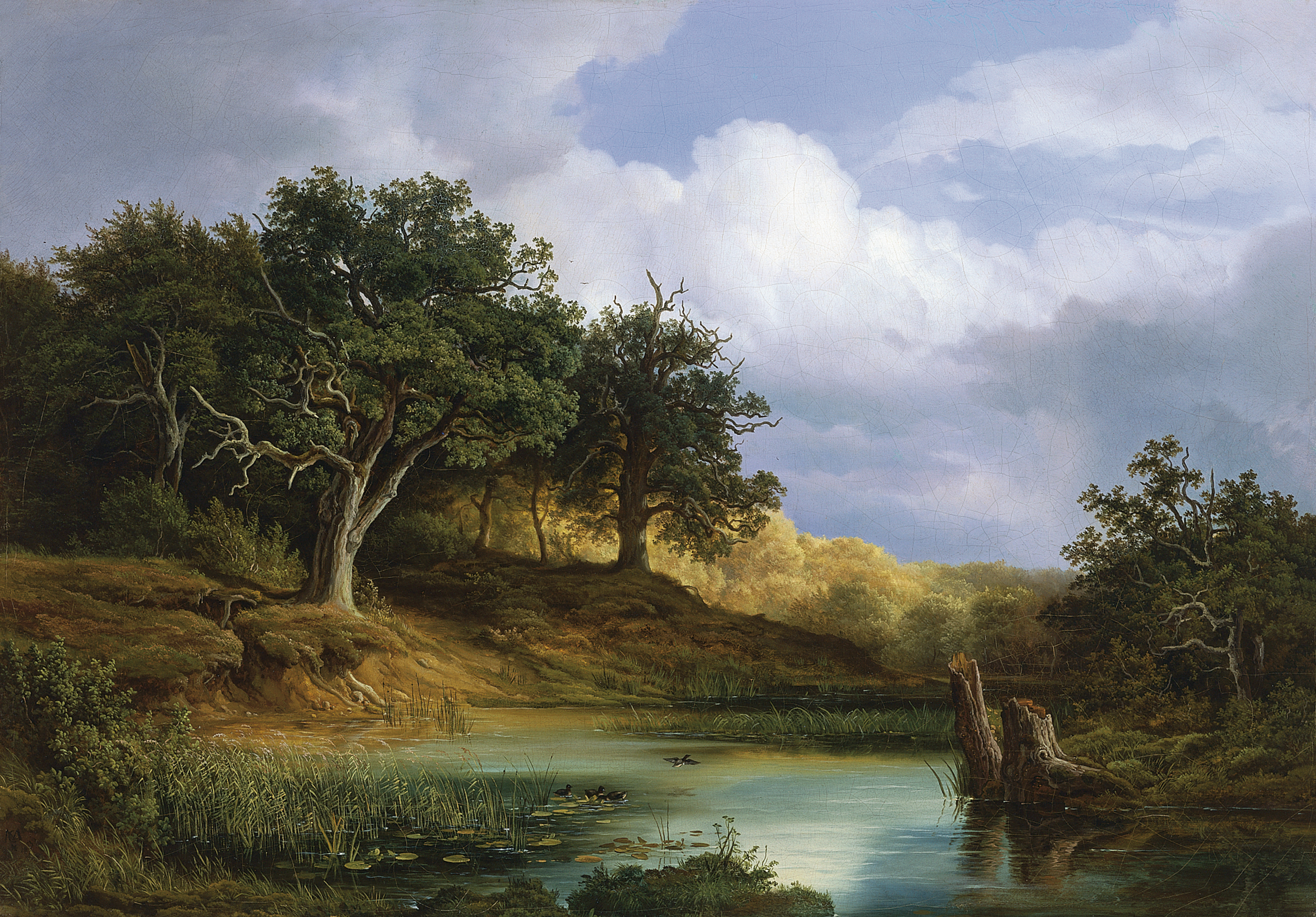
Oak-trees near water (1832)

The winter 1839/40 he returned to Hamburg to stay with his mother. In 1841 he visited Venice and Trieste together with the landscape painter Eduard Schleich the Elder and in 1843, and again in 1846 the central Alps. In the summer of 1850 he stayed on Heligoland. From 1853 onwards Morgenstern spent the summers in Dachau with family and friends, and from 1860 onwards, often by the Chiemsee and by Lake Starnberg.

In 1844 Morgenstern married Louise von Lüneschloß (1804–1874), the adopted daughter of a painter of miniatures, Carlo Restallino. Their son Carl Ernst Morgenstern (1847–1928) also became a landscape painter. He was the father of the famous writer and poet Christian Morgenstern (1871–1914).

Morgenstern died in Munich.

== Importance ==
Morgenstern was highly regarded in his lifetime. Seen from today his importance lies predominately in his early realistic work. When Carl Rottmann returned from Greece in 1835 they became close and livelong friends. Both artists are said to have influenced each other. Rottman's influence is regarded by the art historian Paul F. Schmidt as detrimental to the work of Morgenstern. In 1931 Schmidt wrote (paraphrased): As important as Morgenstern had been around 1830 in Germany for the development of an independent pre-impressionism, through the influence of the late-romantic style of Rottmann and the Düsseldorf group his work increasingly conformed to contemporary taste towards exaggerated Romanticism that tends towards emotional deception.

== Gallery ==
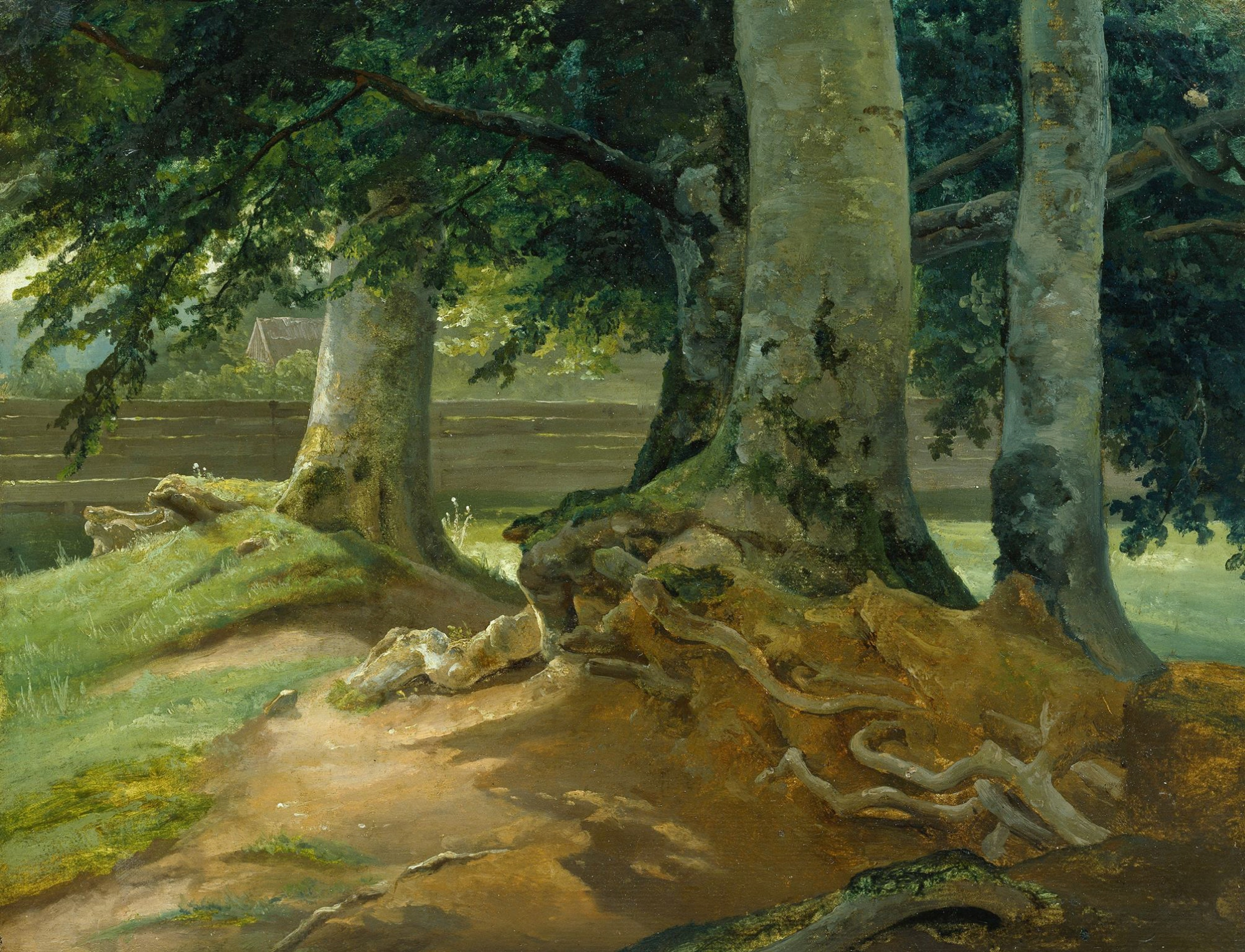
Beech-trees in Frederiksdal near Copenhagen (1828)

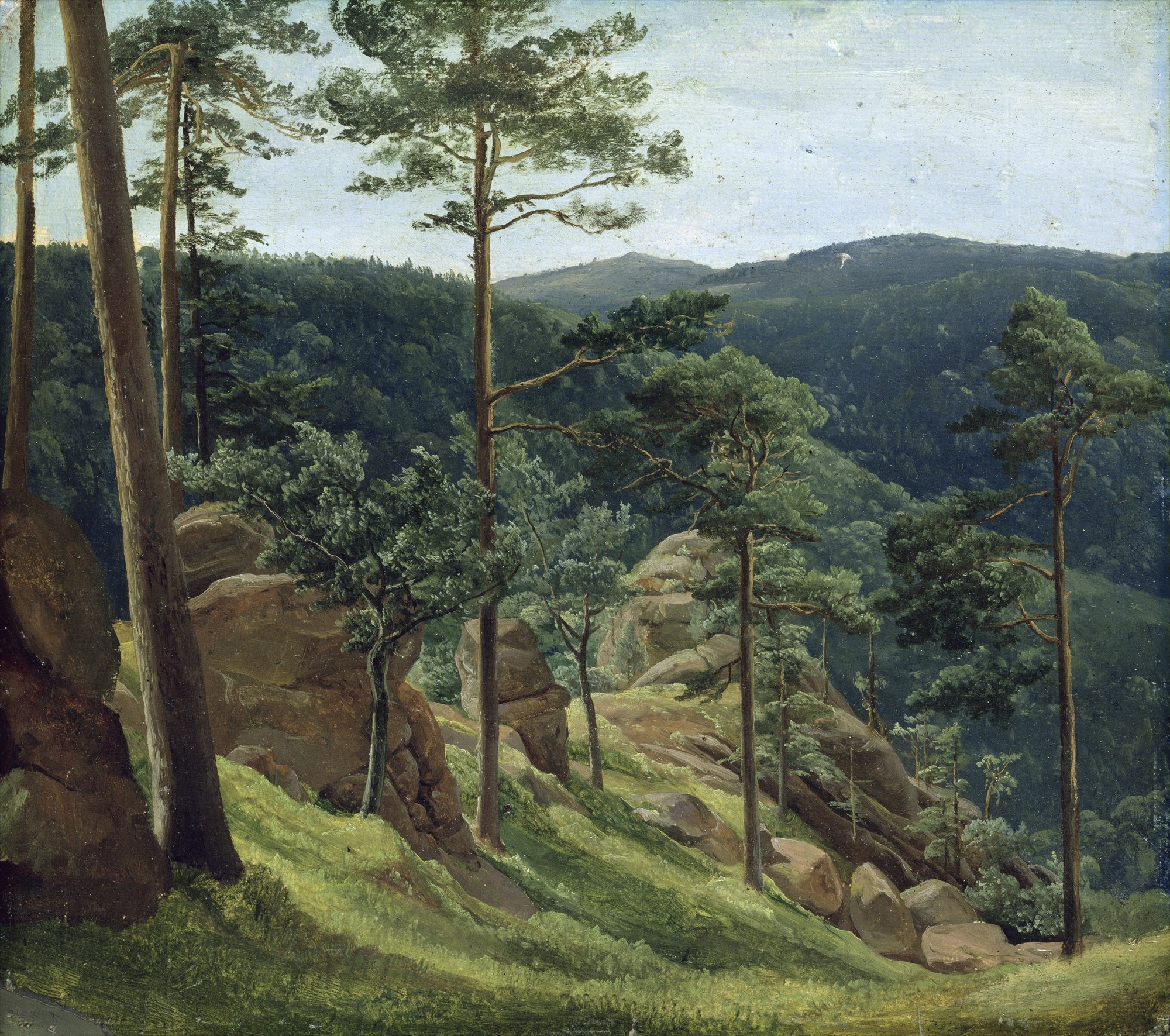
Blick zum Brocken (1829)

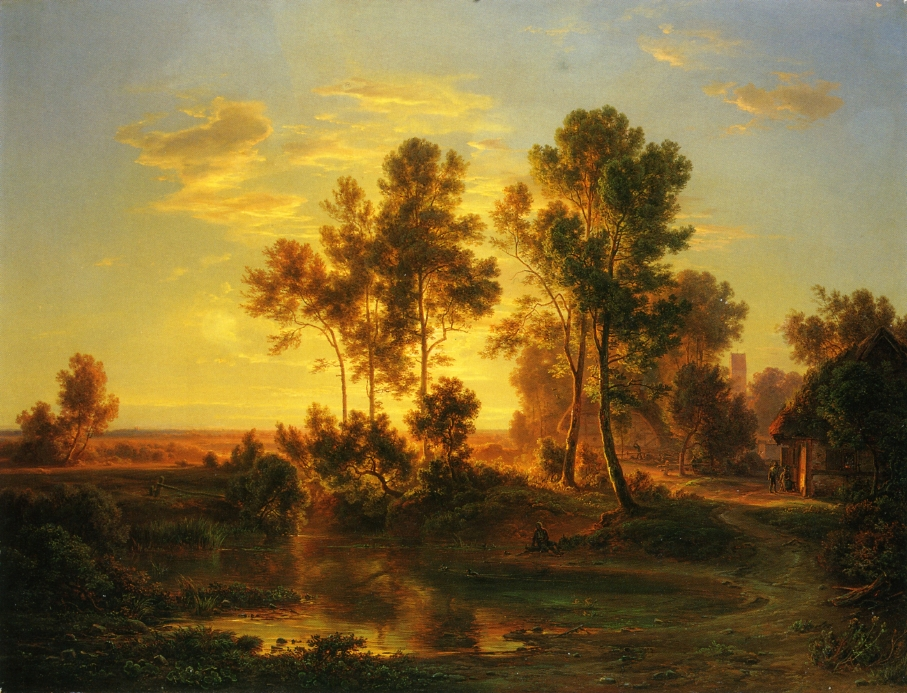
Landscape at dusk (1848)

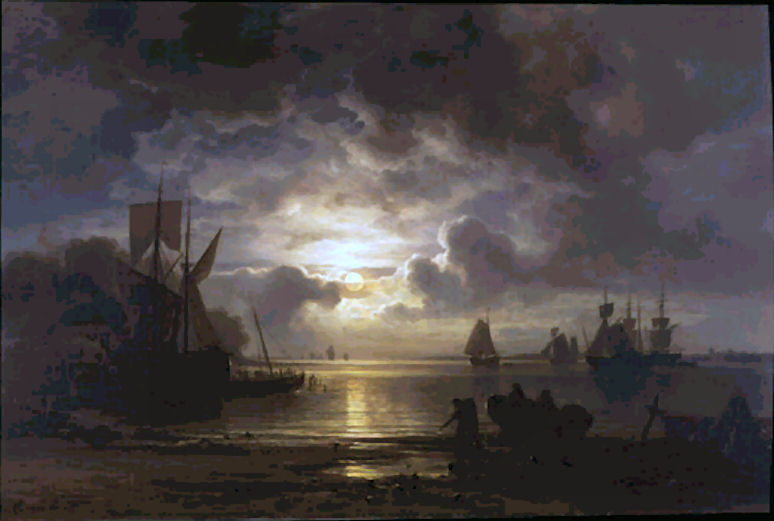
Rising Moon over the river Elbe (probably 1864)

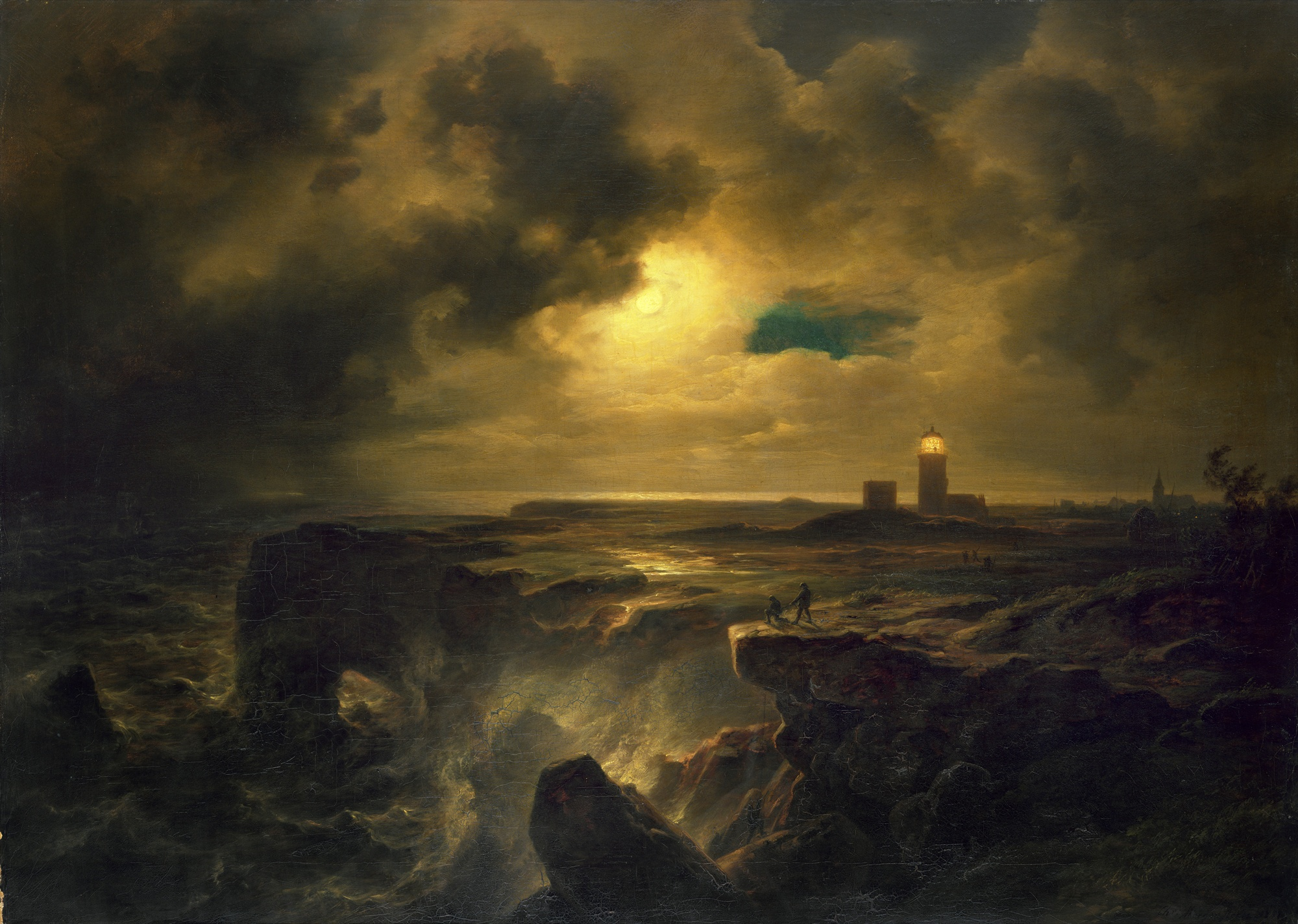
Helgoland im Mondlicht (1851)

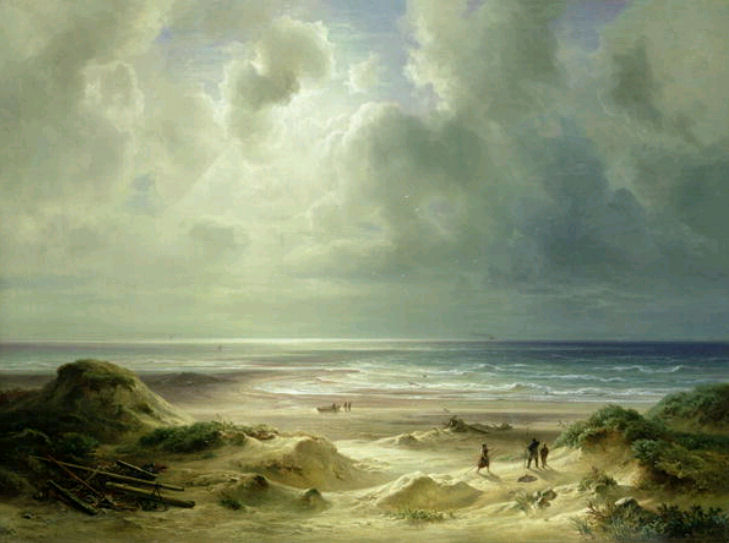
'Dünen an der Nordsee

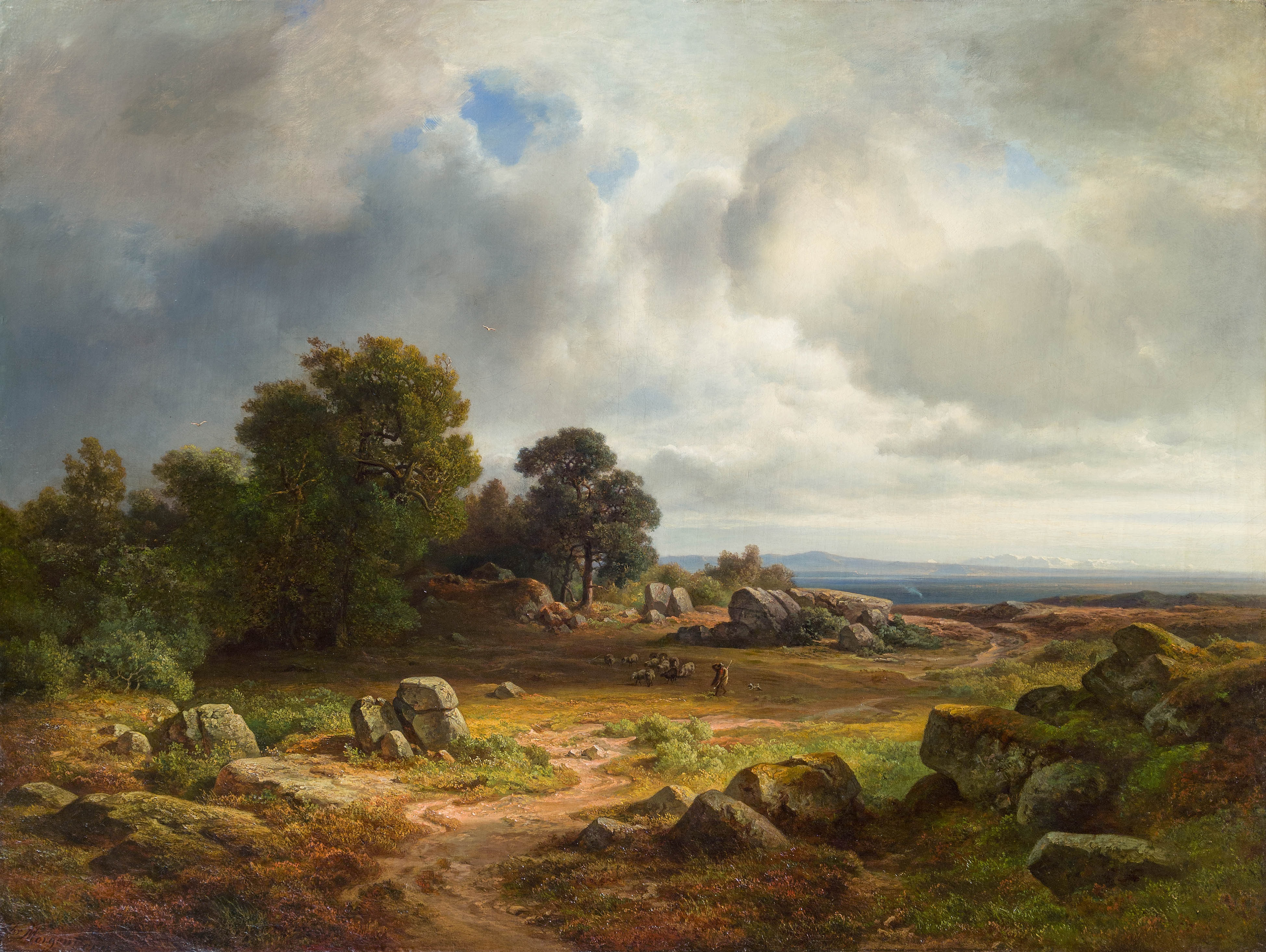
Weite Landschaft mit Schafherde

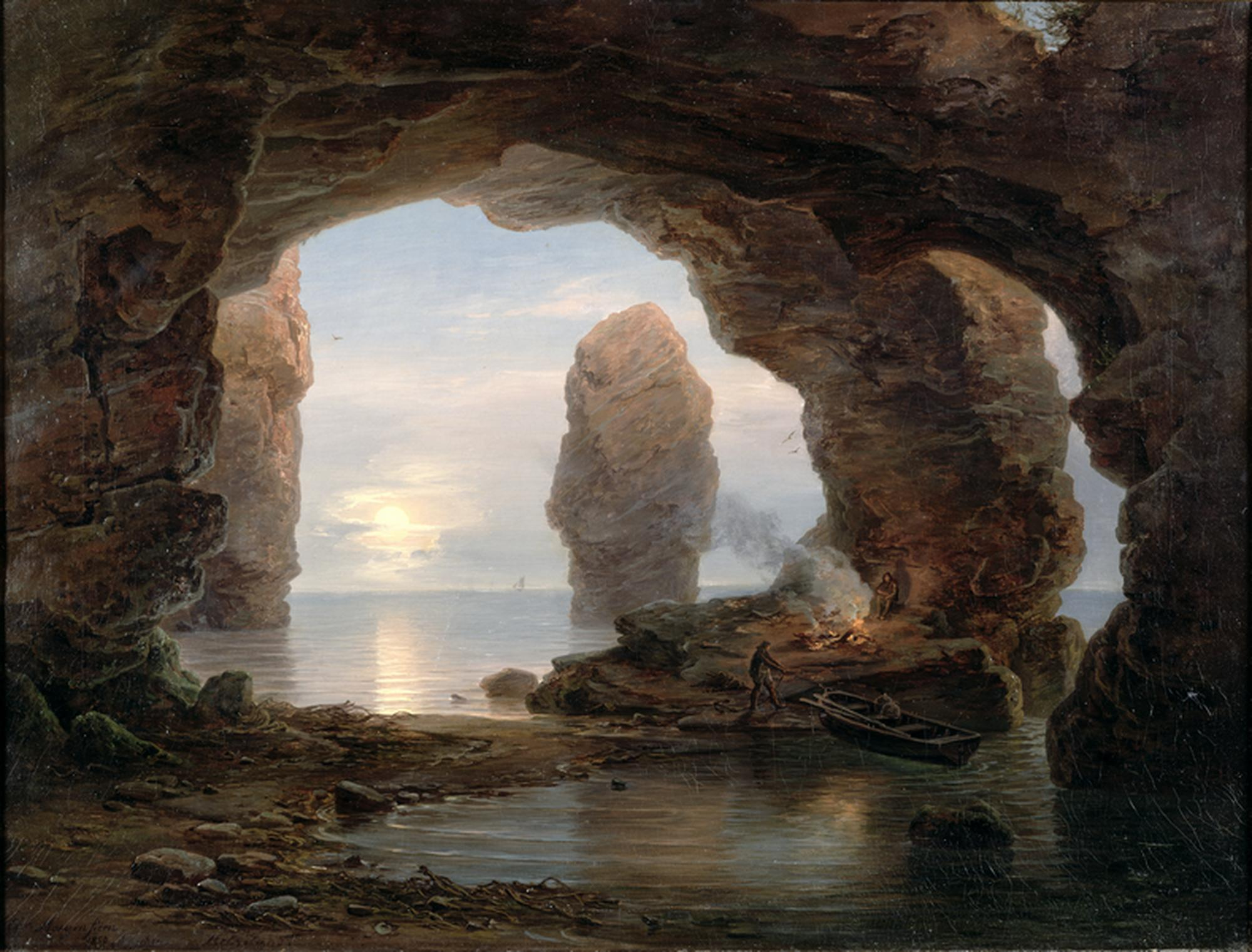
Fischer in einer Grotte, Helgoland

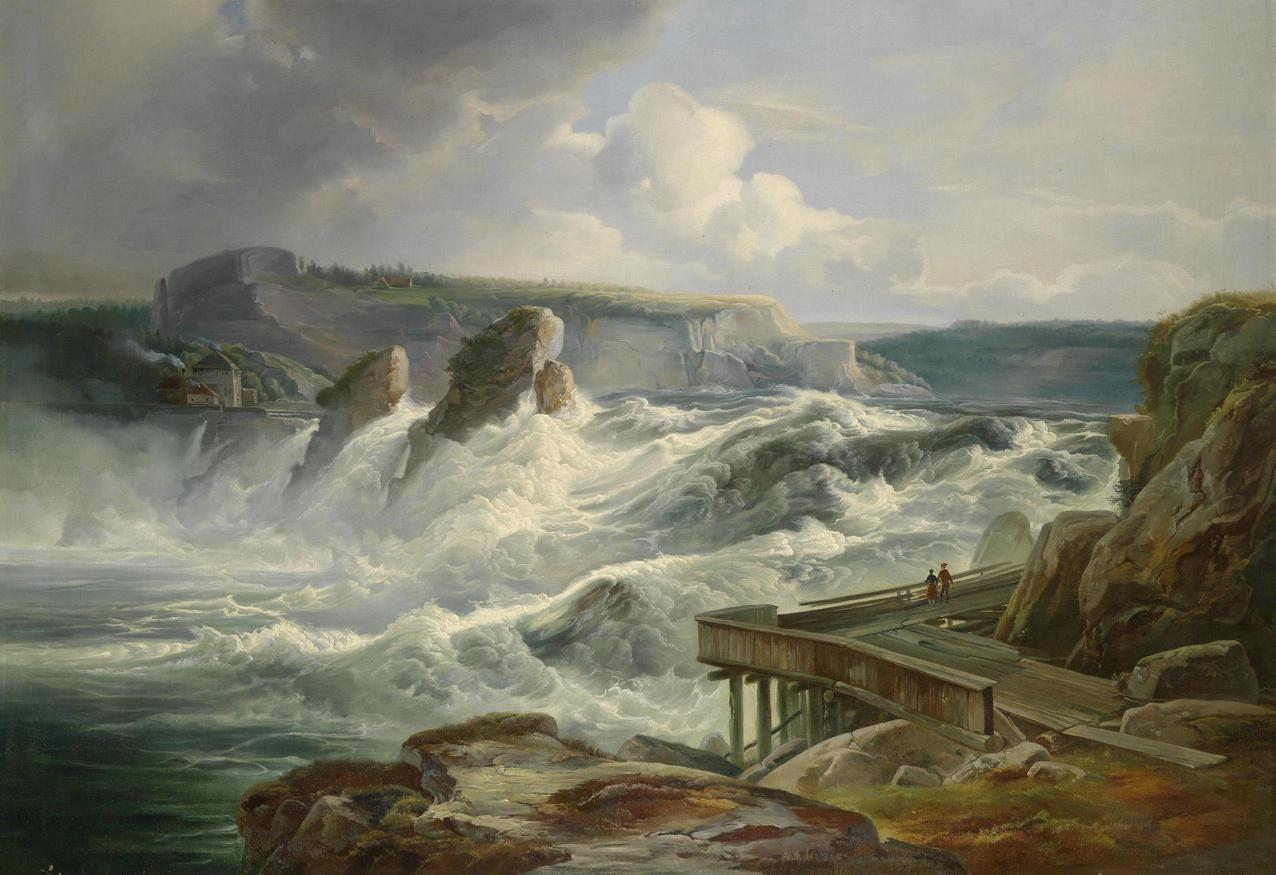
Der Rheinfall bei Schaffhausen
