= Eduard Schleich the Elder =

German painter

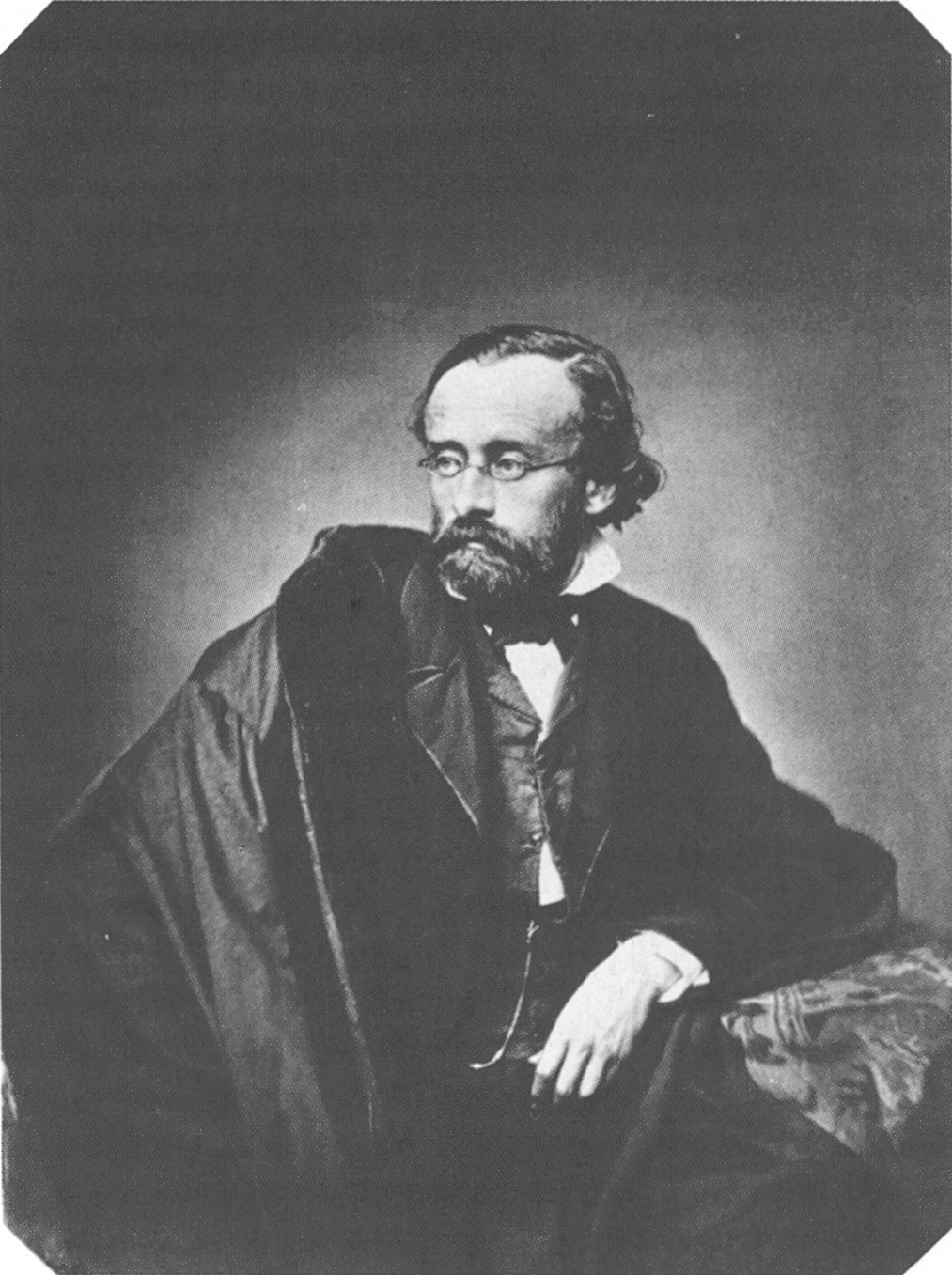
Eduard Schleich, c.1860

Eduard Schleich (14 October 1812 in Vilsbiburg – 8 January 1874 in Munich) was a German painter. He is generally referred to as The Elder to distinguish him from his son Eduard, who was also a painter.

== Biography ==
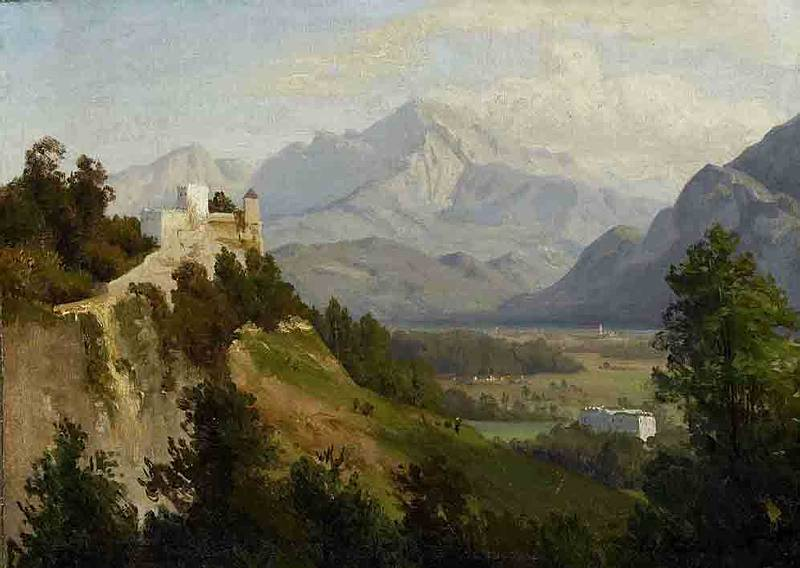
View from Mönchsberg to Hoher Göll

Schleich was the illegitimate son of the judicial administrator at Schloss Haarbach. In 1833, after the death of his father left him destitute, he went to Munich with the intention of enrolling at the Academy of Fine Arts, but was told he had no artistic talent and was rejected. As a result, he began to paint landscapes on his own, modelling them on the works of Christian Etzdorf, Christian Morgenstern and Carl Rottmann.

He then took inspiration from the Dutch Masters, and strove for a greater expression of mood rather than pictorial representation. Travels in Germany, France and Italy broadened his horizons, but he still mostly painted Bavarian landscapes. He increasingly focused on the play of atmospheric processes and objects became the mere carriers of light and color. He often finished a canvas in a single day.

In 1851, he took a study trip to Paris, together with Carl Ebert, Dietrich Langko and Carl Spitzweg. He not only wanted to study the old masters in the Louvre, but discover the latest styles then being developed there as well.

Eventually, Schleich became a professor at the Academy which had spurned him. He was also a member of the Academy of Fine Arts Vienna and the Academy of Fine Arts Stockholm. In 1850, he was elected to the board of the Munich Kunstverein and oversaw the First International Exhibition at the Glaspalast. Many of his best paintings are in the Neue Pinakothek in Munich. From the 1840s until his death (from cholera), he stayed sporadically at the village of Dachau outside Munich, which was becoming popular with landscape artists and would later have a full-fledged art colony.

== Major works ==
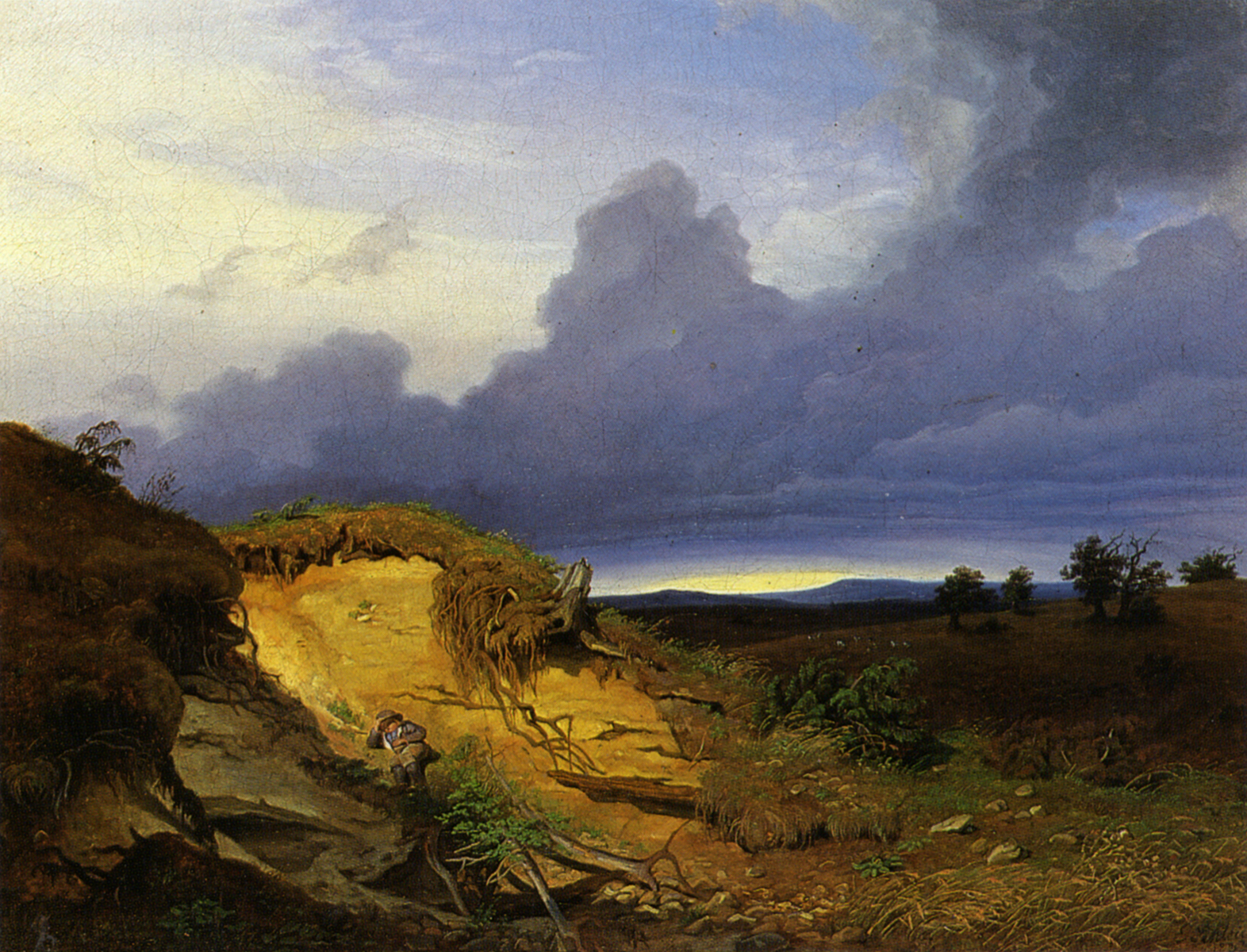
A Young Boy Resting (1833)

- Mondnacht in der Normandie (Night of the Full Moon in Normandy, 1858)
- Isaraue bei München (The Isar Floodplain, near Munich, 1860)
- Nebelmorgen am Starnberger See (Foggy Morning at Lake Starnberg, 1860)
- Herrenchiemsee (Men of the Chiemsee, 1871)
