= Carl Ebert (painter) =

German landscape painter (1821–1885)

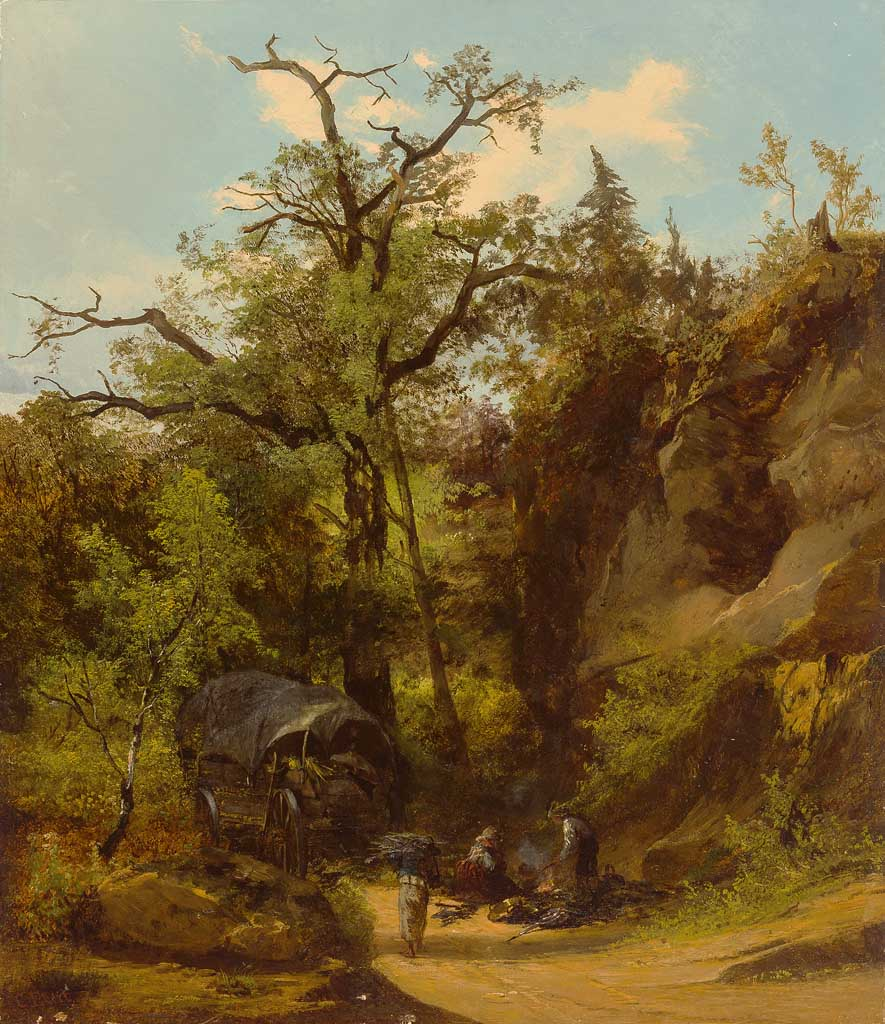
Gypsy Camp in the Forest

Carl Ebert (13 March 1821, Stuttgart - 1 March 1885, Munich) was a German landscape painter.

== Biography ==
Following the early death of his parents, his relatives made it possible for him to study at the State Academy of Fine Arts in Stuttgart, with Gottlob Friedrich Steinkopf and Johann Friedrich Dieterich. In 1846, he went to Munich, where he became a private student of Eduard Schleich, and often visited the Alte Pinakothek to study the works of the Old Masters.

Together with Friedrich Salzer and Richard Zimmermann, he visited the artists' colonies at Polling and Eberfing. After that, he devoted himself entirely to landscape painting; especially forest scenes. He also paid a visit to the Exposition Universelle (1855), where he first came under the influence of the Barbizon school.

Later, he accompanied Schleich and Carl Morgenstern on study trips to France, Belgium, and the Netherlands. He also made trips to Italy in 1857 and 1872, and spent several months in Bosnia in 1881.

He received a state pension from King Ludwig II of Bavaria, and was awarded the Knight's Cross of the Order of the Crown by King Charles I of Württemberg.

== Sources ==
- Max Bach (1904). "Ebert, Carl". Allgemeine Deutsche Biographie (in German). Vol. 48. Leipzig: Duncker & Humblot. pp. 241–242.
- Biography @ the Kunsthaus Bühler
- Horst Ludwig, et al.: Münchner Malerei im 19. Jahrhundert. (Bruckmanns Lexikon der Münchner Kunst) Vol.1: Adam–Gaupp). Bruckmann, Munich 1981, ISBN 3-7654-1801-3, pps.263–264.
- Ebert, Carl. In: Allgemeines Künstlerlexikon. Die Bildenden Künstler aller Zeiten und Völker (AKL). Vol. 32, Saur, Munich, 2002, ISBN 3-598-22772-8, pg. 8
