= Thieme-Becker =

German biographical dictionary of artists

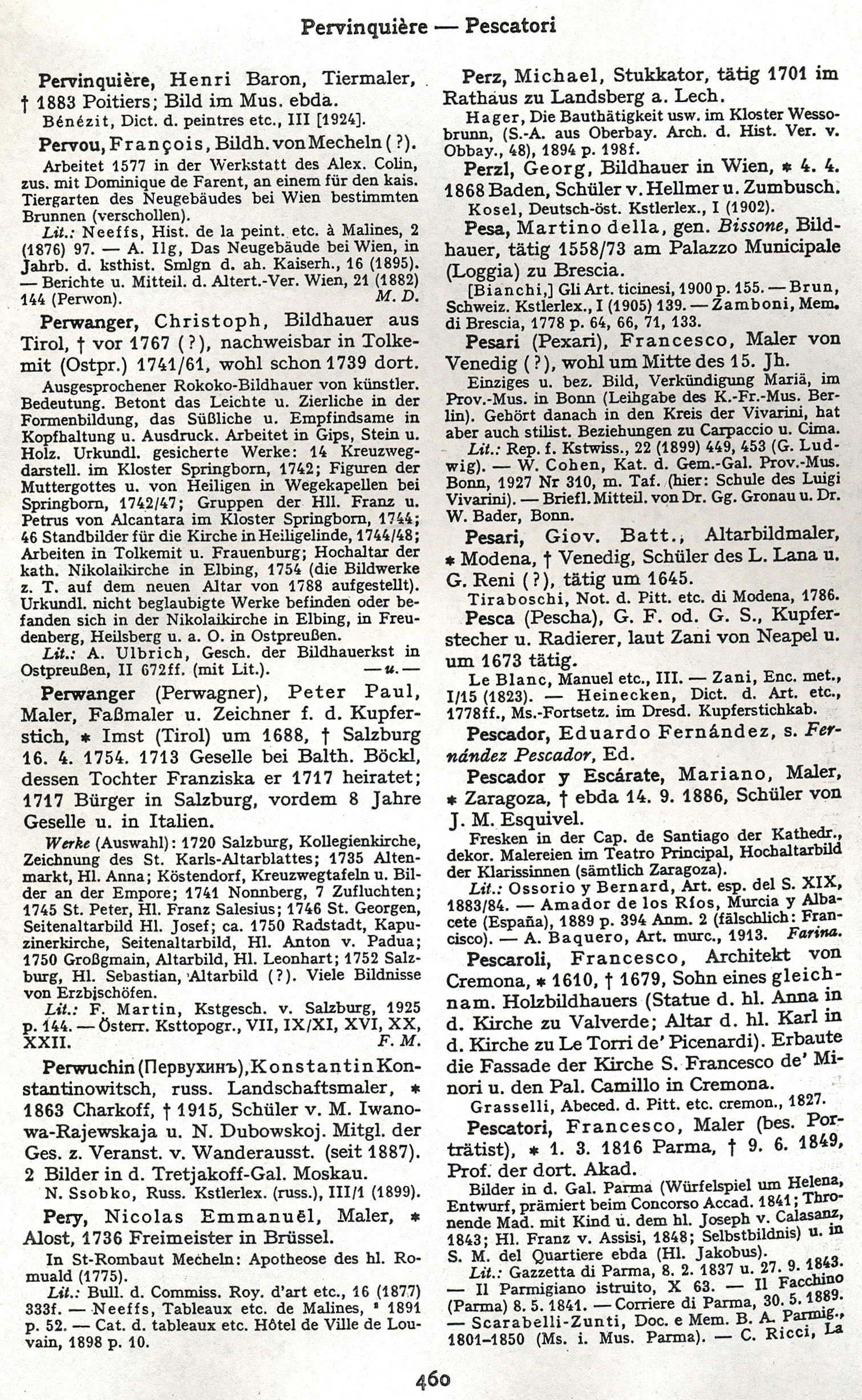
Page 460 of volume 26

Thieme-Becker is a German biographical dictionary of artists.

== Thieme-Becker ==
The dictionary was begun under the editorship of Ulrich Thieme (1865–1922) (volumes one to fifteen) and Felix Becker (1864–1928) (volumes one to four). It was completed under the editorship of Frederick Charles Willis (b. 1883) (volumes fourteen and fifteen) and Hans Vollmer (1878–1969) (volumes sixteen to thirty-seven).

Its full title is Allgemeines Lexikon der bildenden Künstler von der Antike bis zur Gegenwart (English: General Dictionary of Artists from Antiquity to the Present), and it was published in thirty-seven volumes between 1907 and 1950, the first four volumes by Verlag von Wilhelm Engelmann of Leipzig, and the remainder by Verlag E.A. Seemann, also of Leipzig.

== Vollmer ==
Thieme-Becker was immediately supplemented by Vollmer's Allgemeines Lexikon der bildenden Künstler des XX. Jahrhunderts (English: General Dictionary of Artists of the 20th Century), published in six volumes by E.A. Seemann between 1953 and 1962. The supplement is referred to as Vollmer, and the two works together as Thieme-Becker-Vollmer.

== Scope and reputation ==
The first thirty-seven volumes contain 148,180 biographies written with the help of around 400 specialists worldwide. The six supplementary volumes contain a further 47,229 biographies written almost entirely by Hans Vollmer. The attention Thieme-Becker-Vollmer paid to non-Western artists, including those from Asia and the Islamic world, made it a "pioneering enterprise." It is still valued for its coverage of otherwise little-known artists, architects, and designers, and as a summa of art scholarship in the first half of the twentieth century. It "remains the most authoritative dictionary of artists" and the most widely consulted reference of its kind, even in English-speaking countries. The bibliographic sections are considered "outstanding" and "invaluable."

Thieme-Becker-Vollmer has rarely been out of print. Anastatic and photomechanical facsimiles of the original volumes were published from the 1940s to the 1980s, and the entire forty-three-volume set has been reissued in trade paperback (1992), in a student edition (1999), and on CD-ROM (2008). The publication of a six-volume index as late as 1996–1997 was a measure of the work's enduring usefulness.

== Allgemeines Künstlerlexikon ==
A complete overhaul of Thieme-Becker-Vollmer began in 1969 under the title Allgemeines Künstlerlexikon: Die bildenden Künstler aller Zeiten und Völker, or AKL (English: literally General Dictionary of Artists: The Artists of All Times and Nations, but marketed as Artists of the World). Early progress was slow (three volumes 1983–1989), due partly to the project's isolation in East Germany. The pace picked up in 1991, when it switched to "electronic data processing" and a new publisher, K.G. Saur Verlag of Munich. Since 2006, AKL has been published by Walter de Gruyter of Berlin, and by 2014 it had reached Volume 83: Lalix–Leibowitz. There is also an online edition, Allgemeines Künstlerlexikon: Internationale Künstlerdatenbank, or AKL-IKD or AKL Online, which by 2014 included 500,000 biographies (containing information on one million artists); it is continuously updated and about 3,500 new entries are added annually.
