= Christian Ezdorf =

German painter

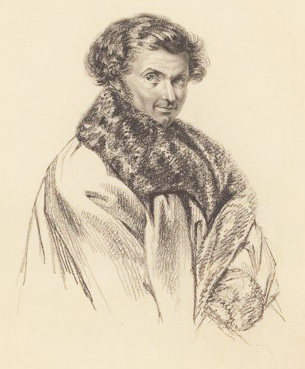
Christian Etzdorf (1830).

Johann Christian Michel Ezdorf or Etzdorf (1801–1851), a German landscape painter, was born at Pösneck, in the duchy of Saxe-Meiningen. He studied landscape painting in Munich and its environs, and displayed an especial talent in representing gloomy forests, taking as his models the works of Ruisdael and Van Everdingen. He visited Norway, the North Cape, Sweden, Iceland, and England. One of his best paintings is in the Modern Gallery at Munich; it represents a Forge by the side of a Waterfall. He died at Munich in 1851.

His younger brother Christian Friedrich Ezdorf (1807–1858) was also a landscape painter. He was educated in art at the Munich Academy, and at first practised porcelain painting, but afterwards devoted himself to landscapes, in which he followed much the same style as his brother, producing forest scenes, rooky valleys, and winter pieces. After his brother's death he returned for a while to Pösneck, but afterwards took to the business of tanning, and settled first in Kissingen and finally in Würzburg, where he died in 1858. Besides his paintings he has left eighteen etchings of landscapes, mostly after his brother, and one lithograph.
