= Wolfgang Kermer =

German art historian and author

- Born: 18 May 1935 (age 91); Neunkirchen, Saarland, Nazi Germany (now Neunkirchen, Germany)
- Education: Hochschulinstitut für Kunst- und Werkerziehung, Staatliche Schule für Kunst und Handwerk Saarbrücken; State Academy of Fine Arts Stuttgart; Saarland University; University of Stuttgart; University of Tübingen
- Spouse: France Kermer
- Awards: Order of Merit of the Federal Republic of Germany; Honorary Senator of the State Academy of Fine Arts Stuttgart
- Scientific career
- Fields: Art History, Art education; Abstract painting, drawing, printmaking and photography
- Workplaces: State Academy of Fine Arts Stuttgart
- Thesis: Studien zum Diptychon in der sakralen Malerei: von den Anfängen bis zur Mitte des sechzehnten Jahrhunderts: mit einem Katalog (Tübingen 1966, ed. Düsseldorf 1967)

Wolfgang Kermer (born 18 May 1935 in Neunkirchen, Saarland) is a German art historian, artist, art educator, author, editor, curator of exhibitions, art collector and professor. From 1971 to 1984 he was repeatedly elected Rector of the State Academy of Fine Arts Stuttgart and thus the first scientific and at the same time youngest teacher in this position in the history of the university. Under his rectorate, the State Academy of Fine Arts Stuttgart was reformed in 1975 and 1978 on the base of two new university laws of the State of Baden-Württemberg and thus, for the first time in its history, authorized to set up diplomas for all courses. One of the accents of his work was the promotion of talented graduates of the academy: In 1978 he organized the first of the so-called ″debutant exhibitions″, an ″unconventional contribution to the promotion of young people″, supported financially by the State of Baden-Württemberg.

Wolfgang Kermer′s focus is the history of Visual arts education, the art of Willi Baumeister and the history of the State Academy of Fine Arts Stuttgart and its predecessor institutions. He was the founder, publisher and editor of the publication series Akademie-Mitteilungen (1972–1978), Beiträge zur Geschichte der Staatlichen Akademie der Bildenden Künste Stuttgart (1975–2004), WerkstattReihe (1996–2006) and ″Die Staatliche Akademie der Bildenden Künste Stuttgart im Spiegel der Presse 1970/1971″ (2008). On the occasion of his 75th birthday, the Stuttgarter Nachrichten called Wolfgang Kermer ″the memory of the Stuttgart Art Academy″. In 2025, he was honored as one of Stuttgart′s most important personalities.

== Biography ==
=== Life and education ===
Born as the son of the Moravian-born Austrian Kapellmeister Franz Kermer (1893 Znojmo – Neunkirchen, Saarland 1936), Wolfgang Kermer spent his childhood and youth in Neunkirchen, Saarland, where he attended elementary school (Bachschule) and high school (Gymnasium am Krebsberg). His father – the paternal ancestry originates from Všestudy (Chomutov District) – died as a result of an injury from World War I, when Wolfgang Kermer was only one year old. The Viennese piano teacher Marie Kermer (1882 Znojmo – Vienna 1957), who studied from 1897 to 1901 with Leopold Landskron and Julius Epstein at the Conservatory of the Gesellschaft der Musikfreunde in Vienna, was his aunt, the engineer Alois Kermer (1894 Znojmo – Vienna 1967), who designed the first Austrian record-breaking glider after World War I in 1923 (located in the Vienna Technical Museum), was his uncle. Wolfgang Kermer's childhood memories include a long stay in 1938 with relatives in Stargard in Pomerania. At the end of World War II he lived in Montabaur, where his family had fled after losing their home in Neunkirchen in a bombing raid at the end of 1944 and where he escaped a fighter plane attack on broad daylight and witnessed the American invasion of the city on 26 March 1945. During the air raids, the hand luggage he was assigned to carry to the bunker always included his late father′s favorite violin.

From the age of six he received piano lessons, which made him waver in his professional ideas between music and art. For several years he was a pianist in the Krebsberggymnasium school orchestra under Josef Rein and, with a bassist (Gerhard Reinhardt) and a drummer (Horst Linn), formed a jazz trio, that performed publicly in Saarland until the mid-1950s. Even in his old age, playing the piano is a vital necessity for him, fascinated by the unattainable depth of musical sensivity and expressiveness of such greats as Vladimir Horowitz, Emil Gilels, Lazar Berman, Evgeny Kissin.

In 1954 his first solo exhibition with paintings and drawings took place in the municipal library of his hometown. The Saarbrücker Zeitung wrote: °Wolfgang Kermer has exhibited an interesting collection, and judging by it, one can speak of a ′hope′ in his work that may perhaps fulfilled on the difficult path that art prescribes for its disciples." After graduating from high school in 1956, he studied visual arts education at the Staatliche Schule für Kunst und Handwerk Saarbrücken and at the State Academy of Fine Arts Stuttgart; art history, philosophy, educational sciences, prehistory and cultural geography at the universities of Saarbrücken, Stuttgart and Tübingen.

The beginning of his studies was marked by three semesters in Saarbrücken and the encounter with the photographer Otto Steinert: From 1956 to 1957 he studied two semesters with the designer Peter Raacke and he completed a one-semester basic course with Oskar Holweck, who further developed his teaching on the instructions of his teacher Boris Kleint, an Itten student. Otto Steinert made it possible for Kermer to use the abundant photo workshops at the Saarbrücken School of Arts an Crafts for his experimental photographic work (photograms).

After he had passed the entrance examination in 1957, Wolfgang Kermer studied for two semesters at the State Academy of Fine Arts Stuttgart with Hannes Neuner, an Albers and Kandinsky student at the Bauhaus, where he encountered an open form of teaching that remained exemplary for him throughout his years as a university lecturer.

In the winter semester of 1958/59 he sat in the academy's bronze workshop under Herbert Heinzel, where he met the sculptors Emil Cimiotti, Otto Herbert Hajek and Paul Reich and their working methods. In 1959 he stayed in Paris for a period of time and studied as a scholarship holder of the French government at the École du Louvre. After passing the exams in ″Werktechnik″ in 1959, in art education in 1961, in philosophy and additionally in education science in 1962 in Stuttgart, he was awarded in 1966 the title PhD by University of Tübingen magna cum laude with the dissertation Studien zum Diptychon in der sakralen Malerei; von den Anfängen bis zur Mitte des sechzehnten Jahrhunderts. Mit einem Katalog. From 1961 to 1962 he was at the Technische Hochschule Stuttgart artistic and research assistant (Faculty of architecture, Chair of Professor Maximilian Debus, a student of Johannes Itten). From 1963 to 1965 he worked as an artistic assistant for photography at the Art History Institute of the University of Tübingen. At this time, after more than a decade of artistic work, that includes paintings, drawings, graphics, photographs related to Informalism, he stopped his exhibition activities to devote himself entirely to his scientific research. He completed long study visits to museums and collections in various countries to compile a critical catalog of medieval painted diptychs as a basis for the temporal, regional and iconographic interpretation of this pictorial form, which was at times highly valued in private devotion.

Wolfgang Kermer was last present with prints in the traveling exhibition ″Neue Deutsche Graphik″, which started in 1962 and was shown in 28 cities in the Federal Republic of Germany, with paintings in 1964 in the Galerie Elitzer Saarbrücken (with Horst Linn) and at the annual exhibitions of the Baden-Württemberg Artists′s Association and the Saarland Artists′ Association.

=== Career ===
Teaching art history since 1966, Wolfgang Kermer worked more than thirty years at the State Academy of Fine Arts Stuttgart, from 1972 as professor and chair holder. After various art-historical articles for the Saarbrücker Zeitung and the Stuttgarter Zeitung, he published a critical report on the state of the Stuttgart Academy during the protests of 1968 and called for a reform of the training of art teachers Since 1969 he has been active in university politics as an elected member of the Academy Senate and as a member of various university bodies in Baden-Württemberg. In order to avoid conflicts of interest, he gave up his work as chairman of the art educators association Württemberg (today: BDK [Bund Deutscher Kunsterzieher] Baden-Württemberg) after two years in 1972 after being elected rector of the State Academy of Fine Arts Stuttgart in 1971. These elections took place for the first time in the history of the university with the participation of all university groups, professors and lecturers, assistants, technical teachers and representatives of the administration. 1973, 1976 and 1980 confirmed by the university committees in this position, he remained rector of this institution until 1984, where he made profound content and organizational reforms after the students protests in the late sixties against backward training conditions, against unlawful admission procedures for studies and the lack of examination and study regulations, against nepotism and the Nazi Past of professors. One of Wolfgang Kermer's first reform measures was the establishment of a ″student department″ on October 16, 1972 (which still exists today) ″to better safeguard and process all student affairs″. The legal status of the academy has been clarified, the inner structure was reorganized, diploma degrees were introduced for all programs and new regulations for admission to studies were created. New types of support for students have been introduced. Kermer promoted international exchanges with artists and art educational institutions in Australia, Austria and South Korea. His special attention was on previously neglected public relations. He founded and edited the series of publications Akademie-Mitteilungen (1972–1978), Beiträge zur Geschichte der Staatlichen Akademie der Bildenden Künste Stuttgart (1975–2004) and WerkstattReihe (1996–2006) and has also written articles and books on modern artists and art education. Internally, with his ″Notices from the Rector′s Office″ (″Mitteilungen des Rektoramts″), Kermer created an organ to promote the flow of information between the university management and the various university groups. He has been the curator of numerous exhibitions and high school events and founded in 1975 the Academy Collection, which he built up over the course of more than two decades with works by current and former teachers as well as alumni. Main acquisitions included works by Willi Baumeister, Gunter Böhmer, Paul Uwe Dreyer, Heinz Edelmann, Marianne Eigenheer, Rudolf Hoflehner, Alfred Hrdlicka, Bernhard Pankok, Rudolf Schoofs, K.R.H. Sonderborg, Giuseppe Spagnulo, Micha Ullman.

In 1972, while visiting the Royal College of Art in London, Wolfgang Kermer met Sam Herman, one of the pioneers of the studio glass movement, who was then head of the Glass Department. On this occasion, Sam Herman dedicated one of his glass objects to him, engraved with the inscription ″Best wishes Dr. Kermer Samuel J. Herman″; it is now part of the collection at the Frauenau Glass Museum. Two years later, he curated Herman′s first solo exhibition in Germany in Stuttgart. As a connoisseur of modern glass design, Wolfgang Kermer, together with Hans Gottfried von Stockhausen and Jörg F. Zimmermann, promoted the expansion of the traditional glass workshop of the Stuttgart Academy with a studio glass furnace in 1983/84, which made it the only art university in Germany that enabled students of all disciplines to work freely with hot glass.

In the summer semester of 1974, Rector Wolfgang Kermer initiated a symposium for students of the Herbert Baumann and Rudolf Hoflehner Academy sculpture classes on the Leonberger Heide, the first event of this kind at an art university in the Federal Republic of Germany. Herbert Baumann and the technical teacher for stone carving, Otto Baral, also took part. Most of the resulting works remained accessible for years until they were removed from the city of Leonberg after they had already been sprayed with slogans for the RAF in autumn 1974 and were irreparably damaged over time.

From 1975 Wolfgang Kermer was also able to organize more exhibitions after a court order had succeeded in freeing the university's exhibition hall, which had been blocked by the illegal storage of obsolete computers since 1971. One of the highlights was the exhibition of Austrian artist Walter Pichler in 1981 with drawings and plans for his architectural projects. On the occasion of the 50th anniversary of the State Academy of Fine Arts Stuttgart after World War II, Wolfgang Kermer has organized the large-scale exhibition "Zwischen Buch-Kunst und Buch-Design: Buchgestalter der Akademie und ehemaligen Kunstgewerbeschule in Stuttgart", which was shown in 1996 at the State Library of Württemberg in Stuttgart and in 1997 at the Klingspor Museum in Offenbach am Main. Kermer's scholarly work has been devoted since the 1970s to the State Academy of Fine Arts Stuttgart and world-famous professors like Bernhard Pankok, Adolf Hölzel, Willi Baumeister, Gunter Böhmer, Alfred Hrdlicka.

One of his specialties is the art and art education of Willi Baumeister: On the occasion of his 100th birthday, Kermer organized in 1989 the first retrospective of his work as typographer and advertising designer (with Catalogue raisonné). The Design Magazine form called the exhibition an ″exciting documentation″. Baumeister's lithographs printed from Erich Mönch at the State Academy of Fine Arts Stuttgart he exhibited in 1975, and in 1979 the exhibition "Hommage à Baumeister" has shown the artistic creations from twelve of his most famous students. His art theory and pedagogic views he devoted publications in 1971 and 1992. Some of Baumeister's writings Kermer reedited in 1999 and 2006.

Guest events organized by Wolfgang Kermer in the 1980s with artists such as Roland Goeschl, Richard Hamilton, Oswald Oberhuber, Walter Pichler and Arnulf Rainer as well as co-operative exhibitions such as ″Art Education in Korea: Studies from the College of Fine Arts Seoul National University″, ″Anton Kolig″, ″The young Kokoschka″ and ″Brancusi Photographe″ activated the public relations work of the State Academy of Fine Arts Stuttgart, a special concern Kermers since the beginning of his rectorate.

His work as rector of the university, which Wolfgang Kermer dedicated to the guiding principle, as he put it, ″that academies only educate tomorrow′s artists if they serve the people of today″, he summarized in a 1984 report on the status and structure of the university, the various departments, their staffing and the workshop equipment as well as the number of students in the diploma courses.

At the end of his work as rector, his professor colleagues thanked him by presenting them with dedicated artistic works, which were shown in an exhibition at the academy and were donated by Wolfgang Kermer in 2005 to the municipal gallery of Neunkirchen.

In 1987 Wolfgang Kermer discovered the forgotten artistic heritage of the Stuttgart Jewish painter Alice Haarburger, who was murdered in the Holocaust. He succeeded in preventing an unworthy dissolution of the artistic estate. In 2016, he donated two paintings by the artist, which he had acquired in art galleries, to the Museum Spendhaus at Reutlingen, the native town of Alice Haarburger. In the same year, 50 years after the Nazi action Degenerate Art, Wolfgang Kermer took the ″first research step″ to work through the chapter ″The Stuttgart Academy in the Third Reich″ with the publication of the volume ″Gottfried Graf and the ′degenerate art′ in Stuttgart″ by Werner P. Heyd.

As far as his own artistic work is concerned, Kermer has exhibited his abstract paintings, drawings, etchings and photographs in more than thirty solo and group exhibitions in Germany since 1954, in France since 2003 In a 2006 interview, he described his return to artistic work after a long break in the late 1970s as ″a revitalizing measure″ for his scientific work.

Also active as art collector – after meeting Erwin Eisch in Frauenau, Wolfgang Kermer was one of the first, if not the first, to collect works of the studio glass movement privately in Germany as early as the 1960s, and this at a time when museums were not yet interested for the new departure in glass art – he donated his private collections of international studio glass, modern French ceramics as well as contemporary paintings, graphics und sculptures to museums in Frauenau, Neunkirchen and Sarreguemines. On the occasion of his seventieth birthday in 2005, he gave his hometown Neunkirchen under the title ″Stuttgarter Begegnungen″, among others, works by Erwin Eisch, Alfred Hrdlicka, Markus Lüpertz, Chris Newman, Arnulf Rainer, Michael Sandle, Gustav Seitz, K.R.H. Sonderborg, Niklaus Troxler, Micha Ullman, Jörg F Zimmermann. The Donation Wolfgang Kermer to the Frauenau Glass Museum in 1982 includes works by numerous major studio glass artists and glass designers, including Sergio Asti, Erwin Eisch, Claire Falkenstein, Kaj Franck, Kyohei Fujita, Sam Herman, Harvey Littleton, Marvin Lipofsky, Benny Motzfeldt, Edvin Öhrström, Sybren Valkema, Paolo Venini, Wilhelm Wagenfeld, Tapio Wirkkala, Ann Wolff, Jörg F Zimmermann. In 2017, he presented the Frauenau Glass Museum with an extensive collection of hand-blown glasses, ″Homage to the unknown glassblower″ he called his donation, typical examples of the production of long-gone glassworks in eastern France. Together with his wife, he donated to the city of Sarreguemines in 2018 their collection of works by important French ceramists from the period 1970–2000.

In 2007 he acquired the artistic estate and personal documents of the forgotten graphic artist and painter Fritz Arnold in order to donate them to the Städtische Galerie Neunkirchen. In 2010 he published the catalogue raisonné of the drawings.

Wolfgang Kermer is married to French artist France Kermer and lives now in Kusel (Germany) and Cendrecourt (France, Region Bourgogne-Franche-Comté) after living in Neunkirchen, Stuttgart, Renningen, Rutesheim and Schillersdorf (Bas-Rhin department in Grand Est in north-eastern France).

== Trivia ==
The collection of the State Academy of Fine Arts Stuttgart contains a full-length portrait of Wolfgang Kermer, which the Austro-German painter Herwig Schubert (1926–2019) created in 1980.

== Honors ==
In 1984 Wolfgang Kermer was awarded the Cross of the Order of Merit of the Federal Republic of Germany and in 2006 he became Honorary Senator of the State Academy of Fine Arts Stuttgart.

== Published works (selected) ==
=== Author ===
- Wolfgang Kermer: Grafik, Zimmergalerie Franck, Frankfurt am Main, 23. 2. 1961 – 14. 3. 1961 (Text by Boris Kleint)
- Wolfgang Kermer: Grafik. Grafisches Kabinett Saarbrücken, Markthallenstraße 19, 16. 8. – 17. 9. 1961 (Text by Wolfgang Kermer, on attached sheet)
- Der Kampf um die Bilder: Kunst aus Byzanz – 9. Ausstellung des Europarats in Athen
- Studien zum Diptychon in der sakralen Malerei: von den Anfängen bis zur Mitte des sechzehnten Jahrhunderts: mit einem Katalog. Düsseldorf: R. Stehle, 1967 [Inaug. Diss.: Philosophie: Tübingen: 1966]
- Evangelium scriptum cum auro pictum: Faksimile-Ausgabe einer karolingischen Prachthandschrift
- Herbert Strässer: Plastiken, Skulpturen, Reliefs, Zeichnungen. Saarbrücken, Buchdruckerei und Verlag Karl Funk, 1968
- Der Zukunft geöffnet oder in Zukunft offen? Zu Struktur und Situation der Stuttgarter Kunstakademie. In: Baden-Württemberg, Heft 7/1969, pp. 19–23; Heft 8–9/1969, pp. 31–36
- Die Ausbildung der Kunsterzieher: Anmerkungen zur Situation im Stuttgarter Gebiet
- Einige Aspekte der Kunstlehre Willi Baumeisters. In: 175 Jahre Friedrich-Eugens-Gymnasium Stuttgart. Stuttgart: Belser, 1971, pp. 126–152
- I. [Erster] Rechenschaftsbericht des Rektors der Staatlichen Akademie der Bildenden Künste Stuttgart über die Zeit vom 22. Dezember 1971 – 22. Dezember 1972: dem Großen Senat erstattet am 14. Februar 1973. Staatliche Akademie der Bildenden Künste Stuttgart, der Rektor, Wolfgang Kermer. Stuttgart: Staatliche Akademie der Bildenden Künste Stuttgart, 1973
- Sam Herman. Exh. cat. Stuttgart: Galerie Günther Galetzki, 1974
- Glasbilder: Arbeiten der Glaswerkstätte. Stuttgart: Staatliche Akademie der bildenden Künste Stuttgart, 1974 (loose leaves in portfolio)
- Symposion Leonberger Heide: Sommersemester '74: Staatliche Akademie der bildenden Künste Stuttgart. Stuttgart: Staatliche Akademie der Bildenden Künste Stuttgart, 1974 (works by Otto Baral, Herbert Baumann, Ivo Bay Müller, Utz Gerhard Brocksieper, Karl Ciesluk, Rainer Hantschke, Gerhard von Harpe, Michael W. Huber, Roger Krötz, Reinhard Scherer, Caspar Warnecke; loose leaves in portfolio)
- Zwischen Industrie und Kunst. Sonderschau im Design Center Stuttgart, 19. Februar bis 25. April 1976. Ed. Textilabteilung der Staatlichen Akademie der Bildenden Künste Stuttgart, Leitung Leo Wollner. (Texts: Ferdinand Schäfer; Ernst Josef Auer; Wolfgang Kermer) Stuttgart: Design Center Stuttgart, 1976 (47 loose text and color plates, some with original textile samples, in portfolio)
- Staatliche Akademie der bildenden Künste Stuttgart / Klasse für Allgemeine künstlerische Ausbildung: Aus der Klasse für Allgemeine künstlerische Ausbilung Hugo Peters. Stuttgart: Staatliche Akademie der Bildenden Künste Stuttgart, 1976 (loose leaves in portfolio)
- Zur Geschichte der Textil-Abteilung, 1978
- Hommage à Baumeister: Klaus Bendixen, Karl Bohrmann, Peter Brüning, Bruno Diemer, Peter Grau, Klaus Jürgen-Fischer, Emil Kiess, Eduard Micus, Herbert Schneider, Peter Schubert, Friedrich Seitz, Ludwig Wilding. Exh. cat. Stuttgart: Staatliche Akademie der Bildenden Künste Stuttgart, 1979
- Zur Kunstlehre Willi Baumeisters: ein Vorschlag zur Reform des künstlerischen Elementarunterrichts aus dem Jahre 1949. Die Studierenden Willi Baumeisters an der Staatlichen Akademie der bildenden Künste Stuttgart 1946–1955. Verzeichnis der ″Didaktischen Tafeln″. Exh. cat. Willi Baumeister: 1945–1955, Württembergischer Kunstverein Stuttgart, Cantz, Stuttgart 1979, pp. 129–134, 147
- Zusammenfassender Bericht des Rektors für die Zeit vom 1. September 1976 bis 30. Juni 1980 vor dem Senat der Staatlichen Akademie der Bildenden Künste Stuttgart am 8. Juli 1980. Staatliche Akademie der Bildenden Künste Stuttgart, der Rektor, Wolfgang Kermer. Stuttgart: Staatliche Akademie der Bildenden Künste Stuttgart, 1980
- Kunsthochschulen bedürfen der ″Öffnung nach außen″, in: Landeskunsthochschulwochen 1981, Gesamtprogramm, Baden-Baden, 5. Juni − 21. Juni, p. 8
- Die Professoren der Fachgruppen Grafik-Design, Innenarchitektur und Design: Ade, Brudi, Bruse, Franz, Heinle, Henning, Jacki, Klink, Kröplien, Lehmann, Mohl, Stadelmaier, Stemshorn, Votteler, Weidemann, Witzemann, Wollner. Staatliche Akademie der Bildenden Künste Stuttgart [Landeskunsthochschulwochen Baden-Baden 1981] Stuttgart: Staatliche Akademie der Bildenden Künste Stuttgart, 1981
- Ansprache zur Eröffnung der Ausstellung ″Filmzeichnungen″ am 12. Januar 1982 im Landespavillon Stuttgart
- Staatliche Akademie der Bildenden Künste Stuttgart, in: Gründe und Hintergründe: Informationen des Ministeriums für Wissenschaft und Kunst Baden-Württemberg, 2. Jg., Nr. 2, April 1982, p. 6
- Werkstatt: die Werkstätten und ihre Lehrer; Staatliche Akademie der Bildenden Künste Stuttgart. Stuttgart: Staatliche Akademie der Bildenden Künste Stuttgart, 1982
- Zusammenfassender Bericht des Rektors für die Zeit vom 1. Juli 1980 bis 31. Dezember 1982 vor dem Senat der Staatlichen Akademie der Bildenden Künste Stuttgart am 25. Januar 1983. Staatliche Akademie der Bildenden Künste Stuttgart, der Rektor, Wolfgang Kermer. Stuttgart: Staatliche Akademie der Bildenden Künste Stuttgart, 1983 (including detailed press documentation)
- Der junge Kokoschka: Ausstellung in der Stuttgarter Kunstakademie
- Möglichkeit der Selbstfindung, in: Kulturelle Angebote: Beitrag der Kunsthochschulen zum kulturellen Leben in der Region, Schriftenreihe ″Aus der Welt von Wissenschaft und Kunst″, ed. Ministerium für Wissenschaft und Kunst Baden-Württemberg, Nr. 8, 1986, pp. 18−19
- Gunter Böhmer an der Stuttgarter Kunstakademie. Stuttgart / Bern / Wien: Edition Cantz, 1987 ISBN 3-922608-47-7
- Österreichische Künstler der Gegenwart: Arbeiten auf Papier; Sammlung Kermer, Stuttgart. Exh. cat. Innsbruck: Galerie im Taxispalais, 1987 (works by Siegfried Anzinger, Christian Ludwig Attersee, Günter Brus, Tone Fink, Heinz Frank, Bruno Gironcoli, Roland Goeschl, Rudolf Hoflehner, Hans Hollein, Alfred Hrdlicka, Martha Jungwirth, Kurt Kocherscheidt, Cornelius Kolig, Maria Lassnig, Ernst Len (since 1989 ″Eva" of the artist group Eva & Adele), Oswald Oberhuber, Walter Pichler, Arnulf Rainer, Gerhard Rühm, Herwig Schubert, Rudolf Schwarzkogler, Martin Walde, Othmar Zechyr)
- Die Stuttgarter Jahre Alfred Hrdlickas: ″Eine Schule des Herausforderns″. In: Ulrike Jenni / Theodor Scheufele (Ed.): Alfred Hrdlicka: Texte und Bilder zum sechzigsten Geburtstag des Bildhauers A. H.. Moos & Partner, Gräfelfing 1988, ISBN 3-89164-070-6, pp. 63–68
- Daten und Bilder zur Geschichte der Staatlichen Akademie der Bildenden Künste Stuttgart. Stuttgart: Edition Cantz, 1988 (= Improved offprint from: Die Staatliche Akademie der Bildenden Künste Stuttgart: eine Selbstdarstellung. Ed.: Staatliche Akademie der Bildenden Künste Stuttgart. Red.: Bernd Rau. Stuttgart: Edition Cantz, 1988, ISBN 3-89322-005-4, pp. 16–31)
- Willi Baumeister – Typographie und Reklamegestaltung. Stuttgart: Edition Cantz, 1989 ISBN 3-89322-145-X
- Willi Baumeister, Typografie + Reklamegestaltung: Vortrag 11. Mai 1990. In: Frankfurter Architektursommer '90 (1990). Ed. Magistrat der Stadt Frankfurt am Main, Dezernat Bau, Hochbauamt. (Texts: Dieter Bartetzko [et al.]) Frankfurt am Main: Magistrat der Stadt Frankfurt, 1992 (= Schriftenreihe des Hochbauamtes zu Bauaufgaben der Stadt Frankfurt am Main; 29), pp. 9–11
- Der schöpferische Winkel: Willi Baumeisters pädagogische Tätigkeit. Ostfildern-Ruit: Edition Cantz, 1992 (Beiträge zur Geschichte der Staatlichen Akademie der Bildenden Künste Stuttgart / ed. Wolfgang Kermer; 7) ISBN 3-89322-420-3
- with Wolfgang Berger, Heike Heimann, Wolfgang Schneider, Peter Schmitt: Jörg F. Zimmermann: glass artist – verre contemporain. Arnoldsche, Stuttgart 1993 ISBN 3-925369-28-7 (text german, english, french)
- Aus Willi Baumeisters Tagebüchern: Erinnerungen an Otto Meyer-Amden, Adolf Hölzel, Paul Klee, Karl Konrad Düssel und Oskar Schlemmer; mit ergänzenden Schriften und Briefen von Willi Baumeister. Ostfildern-Ruit: Edition Cantz, 1996 (Beiträge zur Geschichte der Staatlichen Akademie der Bildenden Künste Stuttgart / ed. Wolfgang Kermer; 8) ISBN 3-89322-421-1
- Zwischen Buch-Kunst und Buch-Design: Buchgestalter der Akademie und ehemaligen Kunstgewerbeschule in Stuttgart; Werkbeispiele und Texte. Ausgew. und hrsg. von Wolfgang Kermer. Ostfildern-Ruit: Edition Cantz, 1996 ISBN 3-89322-8934
- "1968" und Akademiereform: von den Studentenunruhen zur Neuorganisation der Stuttgarter Akademie in den siebziger Jahren. Ostfildern-Ruit: Edition Cantz, 1998 (Beiträge zur Geschichte der Staatlichen Akademie der Bildenden Künste Stuttgart / ed. Wolfgang Kermer; 9) ISBN 3-89322-446-7
- Willi Baumeister: Stuttgart und die Schwaben. Mit einem Nachwort von Wolfgang Kermer "Willi Baumeister und die Zeitschrift 'Der Querschnitt'". Stuttgart: Staatliche Akademie der Bildenden Künste Stuttgart, 1999 (WerkstattReihe / ed. Wolfgang Kermer; 6)
- Hans von Kolb, Direktor der Kgl. Kunstgewerbeschule Stuttgart, 1896–1913. Stuttgart: Staatliche Akademie der Bildenden Künste Stuttgart, 2000 (WerkstattReihe / ed. Wolfgang Kermer, 9)
- Willi Baumeister als Typograph und Reklamegestalter für die DLW. In: Gerhard Kaldewei (Ed.): Linoleum – Geschichte, Design, Architektur 1882–2000. Hatje Cantz, Ostfildern-Ruit 2000, ISBN 3-7757-0962-2, pp. 210–223 (English Edition, ISBN 3-7757-0990-8, pp. 210–223)
- Sammeln für die Akademie: Anmerkungen zur Vorgeschichte, Gründung und Entwicklung der Akademiesammlung. In: Gabriele Merkes (Ed.): Die Sammlung der Staatlichen Akademie der Bildenden Künste Stuttgart: Katalog der Staatlichen Akademie der Bildenden Künste Stuttgart. Stuttgart: Staatliche Akademie der Bildenden Künste Stuttgart, 2000 ISBN 3-931485-41-2 pp. 13–21
- Willi Baumeister und die Werkbund-Ausstellung "Die Wohnung" Stuttgart 1927. Stuttgart: Staatliche Akademie der Bildenden Künste Stuttgart, 2003 (Beiträge zur Geschichte der Staatlichen Akademie der Bildenden Künste Stuttgart / ed. Wolfgang Kermer; 11) ISBN 3-931485-55-2
- Hans Gottfried von Stockhausen – Licht und Raum: Aufsätze, Vorträge, Interviews. Mit einem Vorwort des Herausgebers und einer Laudatio von Johannes Hewel. Stuttgart: Staatliche Akademie der Bildenden Künste Stuttgart, 2004 (Beiträge zur Geschichte der Staatlichen Akademie der Bildenden Künste Stuttgart / ed. Wolfgang Kermer; 12) ISBN 3-931485-66-8
- "Lieber Meister Hölzel..." (Willi Baumeister): Schüler erinnern sich an ihren Lehrer: zum 70. Todestag Adolf Hölzels am 17. Oktober 2004. Mit einem Nachwort des Herausgebers. Stuttgart: Staatliche Akademie der Bildenden Künste Stuttgart, 2004 (WerkstattReihe / ed. Wolfgang Kermer; 11) ISBN 3-931485-67-6
- Die Sammlung der Stuttgarter Akademie: Einige Anmerkungen zur Gründung, Vorgeschichte und Entwicklung aus Anlass ihres 30–jährigen Bestehens. Stuttgart: Staatliche Akademie der Bildenden Künste Stuttgart, 2005 (Werkstattreihe / ed. Wolfgang Kermer; 12) ISBN 3-931485-71-4
- Stuttgarter Begegnungen: Die Schenkung Wolfgang Kermer. Exh. cat. Städtische Galerie Neunkirchen, 18. Mai – 24. Juni 2005 [Ed. Neunkircher Kulturgesellschaft gGmbH; Nicole Nix-Hauck. Katalog: Wolfgang Kermer]
- Aufruhr am Weißenhof: Zu Struktur und Situation der Stuttgarter Kunstakademie zur Zeit der Studentenunruhen 1968/69. Stuttgart: Staatliche Akademie der Bildenden Künste Stuttgart, 2006 (WerkstattReihe / ed. Wolfgang Kermer, 14) ISBN 3-931485-74-9
- Über Baumeister: der Künstler und Lehrer im Urteil seiner Schüler. Stuttgart: Staatliche Akademie der Bildenden Künste Stuttgart, 2006 (WerkstattReihe / ed. Wolfgang Kermer; 15) ISBN 3-931485-77-3 (Texts by Klaus Bendixen, Heinz Bodamer, Klaus Erler, Fia Ernst, Erich Fuchs, Hans Werner Geerdts, Peter Grau, Marta Hoepffner, Hans-Dieter Ingenhoff, Klaus Jürgen-Fischer, Herbert W. Kapitzki, Frans Krajcberg, Eduard Micus, Fritz Seitz, Gerhard Uhlig; with lists of Baumeister student exhibitions)
- Willi Baumeister: Cézanne. Mit einer Einführung des Herausgebers. Stuttgart: Staatliche Akademie der Bildenden Künste Stuttgart, 2006 (WerkstattReihe / ed. Wolfgang Kermer; 16) ISBN 3931485-79-X
- Wiener Blut am Weissenhof: die Stuttgarter Jahre Alfred Hrdlickas. Mit zwei Texten von Alfred Hrdlicka. Privatdruck: Stuttgart 2008
- Die Staatliche Akademie der Bildenden Künste Stuttgart im Spiegel der Presse 1970. Privatdruck, Stuttgart 2008
- Die Staatliche Akademie der Bildenden Künste Stuttgart im Spiegel der Presse 1971. Privatdruck, Stuttgart 2008
- Schriftenreihen der Staatlichen Akademie der Bildenden Künste Stuttgart: Akademie-Mitteilungen 1972–1978; Beiträge zur Geschichte der Staatlichen Akademie der Bildenden Künste Stuttgart 1975–2004; WerkstattReihe 1996–2006, Impression ESPAO-MdS / www.espao.fr, 2008
- Publikationsverzeichnis, Impression ESPAO-MdS / www.espao.fr, 2008
- Fritz Arnold: das grafische Werk 1917–1920. Mit einem Vorwort vom Nicole Nix-Hauck und einem Beitrag von Nina Pirro. Ed. Städtische Galerie Neunkirchen aus Anlass der Schenkung und Ausstellung "Fritz Arnold: das grafische Werk 1917–1920", Juni/August 2010. Saarbrücken: M & G Medienagentur und Verlag, 2010 ISBN 978-3-941715-03-5
- Schenkung Wolfgang Kermer: Bestandskatalog. [Ed. Städtische Galerie Neunkirchen. Katalog: Wolfgang Kermer; Nicole Nix-Hauck] Neunkirchen: Städtische Galerie Neunkirchen, 2011 ISBN 978-3-941715-07-3
- ″Aus Feuer und Sand...″: zum Werk von Jörg F. Zimmermann. Vortrag, gehalten anlässlich der Ausstellung ″Jörg F. Zimmermann: ′Aus Feuer und Sand...′″ in der Kreissparkass Kusel am 19. März 2014. Privatdruck, Kusel 2014
- ... für Ulrich Klieber: Festvortrag zur Verleihung des Halleschen Kunstpreises 2014 (gehalten am 20. November 2014 in der Konzerthalle Ulrichskirche in Halle). Mit einer Vorbemerkung von Hans-Georg Sehrt. Halle (Saale): Hallescher Kunstverein e. V., 2014 ISBN 978-3-941498-15-0
- Moderne Keramik aus Frankreich 1970–2000: Aus der Sammlung Kermer; Ausstellung im Theodor-Zink-Museum, Wadgasserhof, Kaiserslautern, 2014 ISBN 978-3-936036-38-1; co-edited with Jens Stöcker, Marlene Jochem, France Kermer
- Céramique française 1970–2000: Donation France et Wolfgang Kermer. Sarreguemines: Édition Musées de Sarreguemines, 2018 ISBN 978-2-9137-5924-4; co-edited with France Kermer
- Freundschaft - in einer Zeit des Umbruchs und der Neugestaltung : ein persönliches Erinnerungs- und Dankeswort aus Anlass des 100-Jahr-Jubiläums der ″Freunde der Akademie Stuttgart e. V.″ am 22. März 2024. Kusel: Selbstverlag, 2024
- Französische Studiokeramik – rencontres avec des céramistes français: Rede zur Eröffnung der Ausstellung ″Céramique française 1970-2000: Donation France et Wolfgang Kermer″, Moulin de la Blies, Sarreguemines, 20. April 2018. Kusel: Selbstverlag, 2024
- Paul − Erinnerungen an einen Bildhauer. Paul Reich zum 100. Geburtstag am 3. September 2025. Kusel: Selbstverlag, 2025 (with a list of the artist's works in the Wolfgang Kermer Collection)

=== Editor ===
- Akademie-Mitteilungen (1972–1978)

″They provide information about events, exhibitions, competitions, grants etc. in connection with the Academy. They contain a directory of the lecturers and students of the respective grades, report on facilities, productions and tasks of the university and present individual works by lecturers and students.″

- Beiträge zur Geschichte der Staatlichen Akademie der Bildenden Künste Stuttgart (1975–2004)

″The series ′Contributions to the History of the State Academy of Fine Arts Stuttgart′ (started in 1975, edited by Wolfgang Kermer) examines topics related to the history of the Academy and its teachers.″

- Studienführer: Staatliche Akademie der Bildenden Künste Stuttgart, Sommersemester 1973 (first published in 1972 and until 1984/85 edited by Rector Wolfgang Kermer, changing graphic presentation)
- Karin von Maur: Oskar Schlemmer und die Stuttgarter Avantgarde 1919. Mit einem Vorwort des Herausgebers. Stuttgart: Staatliche Akademie der Bildenden Künste Stuttgart, Institut für Buchgestaltung, 1975 (Beiträge zur Geschichte der Staatlichen Akademie der Bildenden Künste Stuttgart / ed. Wolfgang Kermer; 1)
- ″Neolithikum″: Zeitung der Bildhauerklasse Alfred Hrdlicka: Staatliche Akademie der Bildenden Künste Stuttgart Am Weißenhof 1. Ed.: Rektor der Staatlichen Akademie der Bildenden Künste Stuttgart, Dr. Cantz′sche Druckerei, 1979
- Aspekte der Fotografie. Eine Ausstellung von Studenten der Klasse Professor Albrecht Ade. Staatliche Akademie der Bildenden Künste Stuttgart: Katharina Ahlers, Eberhard Bahret, Regina Diedenhofen, Birgit Fischötter, Marianne Gelbert, Andrea Krüger, Wolfgang Marzke, Thomas Meyer-Hermann, Richard Müller, Detlev Sack, Claude Shade, Helga Thamm, Christoph Valentien, Ingo Werner, Torsten Greif, Hans-Peter Kaiser, Brigitte Loeckle, Hans-Rüdiger Lutz. Texts by Karl Steinorth and Bernd Rau. Ed.: Rektor der Staatlichen Akademie der Bildenden Künste Stuttgart. Staatliche Akademie der Bildenden Künste Stuttgart, Stuttgart [1979]
- Johannes Zahlten: "Die Kunstanstalten zur Staats- und Nationalsache gemacht...": die Stuttgarter Kunstakademie in der ersten Hälfte des 19. Jahrhunderts. Stuttgart: Staatliche Akademie der Bildenden Künste Stuttgart, 1980 (Beiträge zur Geschichte der Staatlichen Akademie der Bildenden Künste Stuttgart / ed. Wolfgang Kermer; 2)
- Horst Bachmayer / Klaus Lehmann / Otto Sudrow: Das Typische als Gestaltungsziel: der Lehrer und Produktgestalter Hans Warnecke. Stuttgart: Staatliche Akademie der Bildenden Künste Stuttgart, 1980 (Beiträge zur Geschichte der Staatlichen Akademie der Bildenden Künste Stuttgart / ed. Wolfgang Kermer; 3)
- Hans Klaiber: Bernhard Pankok: ein Lebensbild. Mit einer Vorbemerkung von Wolfgang Kermer. Stuttgart: Staatliche Akademie der Bildenden Künste Stuttgart, 1981 (Beiträge zur Geschichte der Staatlichen Akademie der Bildenden Künste Stuttgart / ed. Wolfgang Kermer; 4)
- Klasse Brodwolf: XIII (thirteen) Studenten der Bildhauerklasse Professor Jürgen Brodwolf, Staatliche Akademie der Bildenden Künste Stuttgart. Texts by Wolfgang Kermer and Bernd Rau. Stuttgart: Dr. Cantzsche Druckerei, 1983
- Junge Kunst in alter Stadt: Ausstellung mit Symposion, Bildhauerklasse Brodwolf. Staatliche Akademie der Bildenden Künste Stuttgart / Museums-Arbeitskreis, Städtisches Museum Haus Löwenberg, Gengenbach, 18. Juni bis 22. Juli 1984. Ed. Rektor der Staatlichen Akademie der Bildenden Künste Stuttgart (Exhibition catalog)
- Johannes Zahlten: Urbanstraße 37/39: Kgl. Kunstschule / Akademie der bildenden Künste: die Geschichte eines Provisoriums. Stuttgart: Staatliche Akademie der Bildenden Künste Stuttgart, 1986 (Beiträge zur Geschichte der Staatlichen Akademie der Bildenden Künste Stuttgart / ed. Wolfgang Kermer; 5)
- Werner P. Heyd: Gottfried Graf und die "entartete Kunst" in Stuttgart. Mit einer Vorbemerkung von Wolfgang Kermer. Stuttgart: Staatliche Akademie der Bildenden Künste Stuttgart, 1987 (Beiträge zur Geschichte der Staatlichen Akademie der Bildenden Künste Stuttgart / ed. Wolfgang Kermer; 6)
- WerkstattReihe (1996–2006)

″In the workshop Series set up as a supplement to the ′Contributions to the History of the State Academy of Fine Arts Stuttgart' (1975–2004), texts by current or former academy teachers and articles about them were published.″

- Horst Wöhrle: Vom Wert des Bleis: der Bleisatz, seine Ära und Aura. Mit einer Vorbemerkung von Wolfgang Kermer. Stuttgart: Staatliche Akademie der Bildenden Künste Stuttgart, 1996 (WerkstattReihe / ed. Wolfgang Kermer; 1)
- Horst Wöhrle: Konstrukt: oder: Der Gebrauch der elementaren Mittel. Stuttgart: Staatliche Akademie der Bildenden Künste Stuttgart, 1998 (WerkstattReihe / ed. Wolfgang Kermer; 5)
- Wolfgang Heger: Montserrat oder auf der Suche nach der sichtbaren Welt: der Maler Rudolf Haegele. Stuttgart: Staatliche Akademie der Bildenden Künste Stuttgart, 2000 (WerkstattReihe / ed. Wolfgang Kermer; 7)
- Joachim Hämmerle: Paysages humains: ein Werkstattbericht. Stuttgart: Staatliche Akademie der Bildenden Künste Stuttgart, 2000 (WerkstattReihe / ed. Wolfgang Kermer; 8)
- Erwin Hirtenfelder: "Die Koligsche Kunst ist geistiger Bolschewismus": ein Bildersturm im "Dritten Reich": die Fresken Anton Koligs und seiner Stuttgarter Akademieklasse im Landhaus zu Klagenfurt. Mit einem Vorwort von Wolfgang Kermer. Ostfildern-Ruit: Edition Cantz, 2001 (Beiträge zur Geschichte der Staatlichen Akademie der Bildenden Künste Stuttgart / ed. Wolfgang Kermer; 10) ISBN 3-7757-9097-7
- Dieter Groß: "Ich sehe mich in allem anderen": Fragmentarische Aufzeichnungen und unsortierte Splitter. Stuttgart: Staatliche Akademie der Bildenden Künste Stuttgart, 2002 (WerkstattReihe / ed. Wolfgang Kermer; 10)
- Horst Wöhrle: "Die Stunde Null": Grafik an der Stuttgarter Akademie nach dem Ende des 2. Weltkrieges. Stuttgart: Staatliche Akademie der Bildenden Künste Stuttgart, 2005 (WerkstattReihe / ed. Wolfgang Kermer, 14)

== Exhibitions ==
=== Solo exhibitions ===
- 1954 Wolfgang Kermer-Ausstellung, Stadtbücherei, Neunkirchen, Saarland
- 1955 Wolfgang Kermer: Malerei, Sonderschau, Staatliches Realgymnasium Neunkirchen, Lichthof
- 1956 Wolfgang Kermer: Malerei und Grafik, Buchhandlung Lorenz Raber, Neunkirchen
- 1961 Wolfgang Kermer: Grafik, Zimmergalerie Franck, Frankfurt
- 1961 Wolfgang Kermer: Grafik, Graphisches Kabinett, Saarbrücken
- 1961 Wolfgang Kermer: Fotografik, Architekturfakultät der TH Stuttgart (with Edgar Ehses)
- 1962 Wolfgang Kermer: Grafik, März 1962, Bücherdienst Eggert (Wendelin Niedlich), Schmale Str. 17, Stuttgart
- 1964 Malerei, Grafik, Galerie Elitzer, Saarbrücken (with Horst Linn)
- 1983 Wolfgang Kermer: Instants fixés: Fotobilder 1980–1983, Institut Français de Stuttgart
- 2003 Wolfgang Kermer: Photographies, Espace Valentin Pelzhof, Soing-Cubry-Charentenay
- 2003/04 Wolfgang Kermer: Instants fixés (Polaroids), Médiathèque La Grenette, Ambérieu-en-Bugey
- 2006 Wolfgang Kermer: Instants fixés, Salle des Ursulines, Vesoul
- 2008 Wolfgang Kermer: Photographies, Médiathèque La Grenette, Ambérieu-en-Bugey
- 2008 Wolfgang Kermer: Photographies, Centre Borvo, Bourbonne-les-Bains
- 2012 Fotoarbeiten von Wolfgang Kermer, Galerie Elitzer, Saarbrücken
- 2023 Wolfgang Kermer: Instants fixés, Café français, Vesoul
- 2023 Wolfgang Kermer: Hommage au cercle: Études-Photos, Café français, Vesoul
- 2025 Wolfgang Kermer: Fotogramme, Grafik, Metallskulpturen, Zeichnungen von 1956 bis 1960, 25. Sept. bis 30. Okt. 2025, galerieampavillon, Saarbrücken

=== Group exhibitions ===
- 1955 Die Jungen im Lande: Saarländischer Künstlernachwuchs stellt sich vor, Museum der Stadt Homburg (Saar)
- 1956 Die Jungen im Lande: Gemälde, Graphik, Plastiken, Keramik, Museum der Stadt Homburg (Saar)
- 1956 Weihnachtsausstellung saarländischer Künstler, Saarland Museum, Saarbrücken
- 1957 Große Kunstausstellung der Stadt Neunkirchen, Neunkirchen, Saarland
- 1958 Der Pfalzpreis für Graphik 1958, Pfälzische Landesgewerbeanstalt, Kaiserslautern
- 1960 Ausstellung Junge Künstler: Karl-Peter Blau, Heidi Förster, Gottfried Gruner, Wolfgang Kermer, Gerd Neisser, Irmela Röck, Württembergischer Kunstverein Stuttgart
- 1961 neue gruppe saar, Festsaal des Kultusministeriums, Saarbrücken
- 1961 neue gruppe saar, Zimmertheater Tübingen
- 1962 neue gruppe saar, Kultusministerium, Saarbrücken
- 1962 Deutscher Kunstpreis der Jugend 1962: Ölgemälde, Aquarelle, Gouachen, Württembergischer Kunstverein Stuttgart
- 1962/63 Neue Deutsche Graphik, Arbeitskreis moderne Graphik, Frankenthal/Pfalz (travelling exhibition through 28 German cities)
- 1963 neue gruppe saar, Städtische Berufsschule, Zweibrücken
- 1963 neue gruppe saar mit der Gruppe ″Arte al borgo Palermo″, Kultusministerium, Saarbrücken
- 1964 Künstlerbund Baden-Württemberg: 10. Jahresausstellung: Malerei und Plastik, Württembergischer Kunstverein Stuttgart
- 1964 Saarländischer Künstlerbund: Jahresausstellung 1964, Saarbrücken
- 1973 Hannes Neuner und seine Grundlehre: eine Weiterentwicklung des Bauhaus-Vorkurses, Bauhaus Archive, Berlin
- 2005 Stuttgarter Begegnungen, Städtische Galerie Neunkirchen, Neunkirchen
- 2006 Stuttgarter Begegnungen II: Die Schenkung Wolfgang Kermer, Städtische Galerie Neunkirchen, Neunkirchen
- 2008 Salon de la photo 2008, Chapelle de l'Hôtel de Ville, Vesoul
- 2011 Stuttgarter Begegnungen III: Die Schenkung Wolfgang Kermer, Städtische Galerie Neunkirchen, Neunkirchen
- 2022 Skulptur und Plastik, Galerie Schlichtenmaier, Stuttgart, Kleiner Schlossplatz

=== Curated exhibitions ===
- 1967 Plastiken von Studenten der Staatlichen Akademie der Bildenden Künste Stuttgart, Böblingen, Städtischer Feierraum; co-curated with Herbert Baumann, Rudolf Daudert and Rudolf Hoflehner
- 1972 1. Verkaufsausstellung von studentischen Arbeiten, State Academy of Fine Arts Stuttgart, Aula (Altbau)
- 1973 2. Verkaufsausstellung von studentischen Arbeiten, State Academy of Fine Arts Stuttgart, Aula (Altbau)
- 1974 Sam Herman, Galerie Günther Galetzki, Stuttgart
- 1974 Glasbilder: Arbeiten der Glaswerkstätte, State Academy of Fine Arts Stuttgart, Aula (Altbau); co-curated with Sigrid Glöggler
- 1974 Symposion Leonberger Heide: Sommersemester '74: Staatliche Akademie der bildenden Künste Stuttgart; co-curated with Herbert Baumann and Rudolf Hoflehner
- 1975 Grußkarten zum Jahreswechsel von Studierenden der Klasse für Werbegraphik Professor Eugen Funk, State Academy of Fine Arts Stuttgart, Ausstellungshalle (Neubau); co-curated with Eugen Funk
- 1975 Willi Baumeister: Lithographien und Radierungen, gedruckt von Erich Mönch, State Academy of Fine Arts Stuttgart, Ausstellungshalle (Neubau)
- 1975 Venini – Murano: 65 Gläser der Sammlung Kermer, Sonderausstellung Frauenau Glass Museum
- 1975 Arbeiten der Professoren der Fachgruppe Freie Kunst an der Staatlichen Akademie der Bildenden Künste Stuttgart, Staatstheater Stuttgart, Opera house
- 1975 Otto Baral: Plastiken, Zeichnungen, Holzschnitte und Lithographien, State Academy of Fine Arts Stuttgart, Ausstellungshalle (Neubau), co-curated with Otto Baral
- 1976 Studierende der Klasse Böhmer, State Academy of Fine Arts Stuttgart, Ausstellungshalle (Neubau); co-curated with Gunter Böhmer
- 1976 Glaskunst der 60er und 70er Jahre: 65 Objekte von 65 Künstlern, Sonderausstellung Frauenau Glass Museum, Dezember 1976 – November 1977
- 1977 Karl Rössing zum 80. Geburtstag: Ausstellung von ehemaligen Schülern: Robert Förch, Wolfgang Gäfgen, Dieter Groß, Christine Heuer, Heinrich Heuer, Friedrich Meckseper, Walter Rabe, Malte Sartorius, Walter Schöllhammer, Günter Schöllkopf, Hans Peter Willberg, State Academy of Fine Arts Stuttgart, Ausstellungshalle (Neubau)
- 1978 Druckgrafik australischer Kunststudenten, State Academy of Fine Arts Stuttgart, Ausstellungshalle (Neubau); co-curated with the Print Council of Australia and Institut für Auslandsbeziehungen, Stuttgart
- 1978 Johannes Hewel, State Academy of Fine Arts Stuttgart, Ausstellungshalle (Neubau); first ″debutant exposition″
- 1979 Hommage à Baumeister: Klaus Bendixen, Karl Bohrmann, Peter Brüning, Bruno Diemer, Peter Grau, Klaus Jürgen-Fischer, Emil Kiess, Eduard Micus, Herbert Schneider, Peter Schubert, Friedrich Seitz, Ludwig Wilding, State Academy of Fine Arts Stuttgart, Ausstellungshalle (Neubau)
- 1979 Willi Baumeister: 1945–1955, Württembergischer Kunstverein Stuttgart; co-curated with Peter Beye, Eugen Keuerleber, Tilman Osterwold
- 1979 Kunstausbildung in Korea: Studienarbeiten College of Fine Arts Seoul National University, State Academy of Fine Arts Stuttgart, Ausstellungshalle (Neubau); co-curated with the Goethe Institute Seoul
- 1979 ″Neolithikum″: Bildhauerklasse Alfred Hrdlicka, State Academy of Fine Arts Stuttgart, Campus; co-curated with Alfred Hrdlicka and his students
- 1981 Camille Virot – Itinéraire raku 1972–1980; co-curated with Jacques Gontier, Institut français Stuttgart
- 1981 Begegnung mit Walter Pichler, State Academy of Fine Arts Stuttgart, Aula (Altbau); co-curated with Walter Pichler
- 1981 Landeskunsthochschulwochen 1981, Baden-Baden, co-curator
- 1981 Entwürfe und Bühnenbilder: Klasse Professor Jürgen Rose, Rüdiger Tamschick, Galerie ″Kultur unterm Turm″, Stuttgart; co-curated with Jürgen Rose and Rüdiger Tamschick
- 1981 10 Jahre Stuttgarter Glas, Galerie ″Kultur unterm Turm″, Stuttgart; co-curated with Hans Gottfried von Stockhausen
- 1982 Johannes Hewel: druckgraphische Arbeiten, Mappen und Bücher 1970–1981, State Academy of Fine Arts Stuttgart, Ausstellungshalle (Neubau)
- 1982 ″Werkstatt″: Ausstellung der Werkstätten der Stuttgarter Akademie und ihrer Lehrer, State Academy of Fine Arts Stuttgart, Ausstellungshalle (Neubau); co-curated with Horst Wöhrle
- 1983 Ausstellung Klasse Brodwolf: plastische Arbeiten, Installationen, Foto-Dokumentationen, Zeichnungen, State Academy of Fine Arts Stuttgart, Ausstellungshalle (Neubau); co-curated with Jürgen Brodwolf
- 1984 Der junge Kokoschka, State Academy of Fine Arts Stuttgart, Ausstellungshalle (Neubau); co-curated with University of Applied Arts Vienna
- 1984 Brancusi Photographe – Photos aus dem Besitz des Centre Georges Pompidou, Paris, State Academy of Fine Arts Stuttgart, Ausstellungshalle (Neubau); co-curated with Institut français Stuttgart
- 1984 Ausstellung Klassen für Freie Kunst, Plastik, Malerei, Graphik, Bundesministerium für Bildung und Wissenschaft, Bonn
- 1985 Premiere der Akademiesammlung anlässlich ihres zehnjährigen Bestehens, Stuttgart, Ministerium für Wissenschaft und Kunst Baden-Württemberg
- 1987 Österreichische Künstler der Gegenwart: Arbeiten auf Papier; Sammlung Kermer, Stuttgart. Galerie im Taxispalais, Innsbruck; co-curated with Magdalena Hörmann
- 1989 Willi Baumeister: Typographie und Reklamegestaltung, State Academy of Fine Arts Stuttgart, Ausstellungshalle (Neubau)
- 1990 Willi Baumeister: Typographie und Reklamegestaltung, Deutscher Werkbund, Frankfurt
- 1993 Claude Morin, verrier de Dieulefit, Glasgestalter aus Frankreich, Frauenau Glass Museum, Frauenau; co-curated with Alfons Hannes and Claude Morin
- 1996 Zwischen Buch-Kunst und Buch-Design: Buchgestalter der Akademie und ehemaligen Kunstgewerbeschule in Stuttgart, Württembergische Landesbibliothek, Stuttgart (on the occasion of the 50th anniversary of the State Academy of Fine Arts Stuttgart after World War II)
- 1997 Zwischen Buch-Kunst und Buch-Design: Buchgestalter der Akademie und ehemaligen Kunstgewerbeschule in Stuttgart, Klingspor Museum, Offenbach am Main (The same artists were represented as in the 1996 Stuttgart exhibition: Albrecht Ade, Albrecht Appelhans, Willi Baumeister, Horst Bergmann, Gunter Böhmer, Christoph Brudi, Walter Brudi, Johann Vincenz Cissarz, Heinz Edelmann, Eugen Funk, Paul Haustein, Günter Jacki, Michael Kimmerle, Manfred Kröplien, Hans Meid, Hannes Neuner, Bernhard Pankok, Horst Pichl, Hans-Georg Pospischil, Karl Rössing, F. H. Ernst Schneidler, Peter Steiner, Kurt Weidemann, Horst Wöhrle)
- 2002 Horst Wöhrle: Die Poesie des Konkreten, Evangelische Tagungsstätte Löwenstein, Altenhau 57, Löwenstein; co-curated with Horst Wöhrle
- 2005 Stuttgarter Begegnungen: die Schenkung Wolfgang Kermer, Städtische Galerie Neunkirchen; co-curated with Nicole Nix-Hauck
- 2010 Schenkung Wolfgang Kermer: ″Fritz Arnold: das grafische Werk 1917–1920″, Städtische Galerie Neunkirchen; co-curated with Nicole Nix-Hauck
- 2011/12 Stuttgarter Begegnungen III: die Schenkung Wolfgang Kermer, Städtische Galerie Neunkirchen; co-curated with Nicole Nix-Hauck
- 2014 Moderne Keramik aus Frankreich 1970–2000: aus der Sammlung Kermer, Theodor-Zink-Museum, Kaiserslautern; co-curated with Marlene Jochem, France Kermer and Jens Stöcker
- 2014 ″Aus Feuer und Sand...″ : Jörg F Zimmermann, Kreissparkasse Kusel, co-curated with the artist
- 2018 Céramique française 1970–2000: Donation France et Wolfgang Kermer, Sarreguemines, Musées de Sarreguemines; co-curated with France Kermer

== Literature (selected) ==
- Men of Achievement. Fifth Edition 1978. Editorial Director: Ernest Kay. International Biographical Center, Cambridge, England, 1978 ISBN 0-900332-48-4, p. 288, with portrait illustration
- Who's Who in the World 1978-1979. Chicago (Ill.): Marquis Who's Who Inc, 4th Edition, 1978 ISBN 0837911044, p. 510
- Knaurs Prominentenlexikon 1980: die persönlichen Daten der Prominenz aus Politik, Wirtschaft, Kultur und Gesellschaft. München/Zürich: Droemersche Verlagsanstalt Th. Knaur Nachf., 1979 (1. Ausgabe) ISBN 3-426-07604-7, p. 220–221
- Knaurs Prominentenlexikon: die persönlichen Daten der Prominenz aus Politik, Wirtschaft, Kultur und Gesellschaft. München/Zürich: Droemersche Verlagsanstalt Th. Knaur Nachf., 1982 (3. Ausgabe) ISBN 3-426-07635-7, p. 226
- Für Wolfgang Kermer, Stuttgart: Staatliche Akademie der Bildenden Künste Stuttgart, 1984
- Die Staatliche Akademie der Bildenden Künste Stuttgart: eine Selbstdarstellung. Ed.: Staatliche Akademie der Bildenden Künste Stuttgart. Red: Bernd Rau. Stuttgart: Edition Cantz, 1988, ISBN 3-89322-005-4, p. 243 (Statement Wolfgang Kermer on the teaching of art history at the Academy, portrait drawing by Gunter Böhmer)
- Alfons Hannes (with Erwin Eisch and Wolfgang Kermer): Die Sammlung Wolfgang Kermer, Glasmuseum Frauenau: Glas des 20. Jahrhunderts; 50er bis 70er Jahre. Schnell & Steiner, München, Zürich 1989 (= Bayerische Museen; 9) ISBN 3-79540-753-2
- Die Staatliche Akademie der Bildenden Künste Stuttgart. Realisiert von Studierenden der Klasse Hans-Georg Pospischil. Illustrationen: Heinz Edelmann. Stuttgart: Staatliche Akademie der Bildenden Künste Stuttgart, 1995, p. 42
- Staatliche Akademie der Bildenden Künste Stuttgart (Ed.): Publikationen. Zusammenstellung und Redaktion: Gabriele Merkes. Druck und Herstellung: Jung & Brecht, Stuttgart 1997, pp. 5, 6, 8, 9, 10, 11, 14, 15
- Margarita Jonitz: Herwig Schubert: Bildnis Dr. W. Kermer. In: Gabriele Merkes (Ed.): Die Sammlung der Staatlichen Akademie der Bildenden Künste Stuttgart: Katalog der Staatlichen Akademie der Bildenden Künste Stuttgart. Stuttgart: Staatliche Akademie der Bildenden Künste Stuttgart, 2000 ISBN 3-931485-41-2, p. 81
- Gerd Meiser: Ein lebendiges Kapitel Neunkircher Geschichte: ″SZ″-Serie: Karrieren außerhalb der Kreisgrenzen – Heute: Kunsthistoriker Professor Wolfgang Kermer. In: Neunkircher Rundschau, Nr. 45, 22. Februar 2002, p. B 1 / Nk
- Nikolai B. Forstbauer: Für das Geschichtsgewissen der Stuttgarter Akademie: dem Kunsthistoriker Wolfgang zum 70. Geburtstag. In: Stuttgarter Nachrichten, Nr. 112, 18. Mai 2005, p. 16
- Stuttgarter Begegnungen: die Schenkung Wolfgang Kermer. Städtische Galerie Neunkirchen, 18. Mai – 24. Juni 2005. Ed. Neunkircher Kulturgesellschaft gGmbH, Nicole Nix-Hauck. Katalog: Wolfgang Kermer
- Großzügiges Geschenk an Neunkirchen: Professor Wolfgang Kermer bringt Arbeiten großer Künstler nach Neunkirchen. In: VIP′s, Das Magazin für den Landkreis Neunkirchen, Juni 2005, 14. Jahrgang, p. 39
- Kürschners Deutscher Gelehrten-Kalender: bio-bibliographisches Verzeichnis deutschsprachiger Wissenschaftler der Gegenwart. 20. Ausgabe, Band II. K. G. Saur Verlag, München 2005 ISBN 3-598-23612-3, p. 1660
- Muzeum skla ve Frauenau: Stálé expozice – Průvodce v češtině. (Překlad: Radka Bonacková) Glasmuseum Frauenau 2005, without pagination, [35]
- Sabine Graf: ″Jedes Bild steht für eine Begegnung″: Kreisstadt Neunkirchen erhielt Kunstsammlung. In: Arbeitnehmer: Zeitschrift der Arbeitskammer des Saarlndes. - Saarbrücken: Arbeitskammer des Saarlandes, Bd. 54 (2006), 2, p. 39
- gm (= Gerd Meiser): Herzschlag für die Stadt, 2006
- Schenkung Wolfgang Kermer: Bestandskatalog. Ed. Städtische Galerie Neunkirchen, Neunkirchen 2011 ISBN 978-3-941715-07-3
- Marlene Jochem: Zwischen Gefäss und Objekt: Das Theodor-Zink-Museum zeigt moderne Keramik aus Frankreich- In: Lutra, Kulturmagazin Kaiserslautern, № 7, 02/2014, pp. 18–19
- Wer ist wer? : das deutsche Who's Who; Bundesrepublik Deutschland = The German who's who = Le who's who allemand. LII 2015/2016. Lübeck: Schmidt-Römhild, 2015 ISBN 978-3-7950-2055-2, p. 487
- Günter Scharwath: Das große Lexikon der Saar-Region: biografisches Verzeichnis von Bildenden Künstlerinnen und Künstlern der Saar-Region aus allen Fachrichtungen und Zeiten. Saarbrücken: Geistkirch, 2017 ISBN 978-3-946036-61-6, pp. 504–505
- Anne-Claire Meffre: France et Wolfgang Kermer: en voyage entre l'art et le feu. In: La Revue de la Céramique et du Verre, no. 230, janvier-février 2020 ISSN 0294-202X, pp. 60–63
- Rainer Dick: Wolfgang Kermer wird 90: Der einzig verbliebene humane Freiraum. In: Die Rheinpfalz, Nr. 112, 15. Mai 2025
- Sebastian Dingler: Vom Kriegskind zum Kunstprofessor − Wolfgang Kermer wird 90. In: Saarbrücker Zeitung, 17./18. Mai 2025, Kultur B 5
- State Academy of Fine Arts Stuttgart: Zum 90. Geburtstag von Prof. Dr. Wolfgang Kermer, https://www.abk-stuttgart.de/news/zum-90-geburtstag-von-wolfgang-kermer/. Retrieved 2025-06-28
- Nicole Baronsky-Ottmann: Wolfgang Kermers frühe Kunstwerke: Der Kunsthistoriker, Publizist und Kunstsammler, der einst Künstler war. In: OPUS, Das Kunstmagazin der Großregion, Nr. 110, Juli/August 2025, pp. 41−42
- Nele Hofmann: Stuttgarter Macher: die 44 wichtigsten Persönlichkeiten der Schwaben-Metropole. FlipFlop, München 2025 ISBN 978-3-6953-7927-9, pp. 70−71
