= Frauenau Glass Museum =

Museum in Bavaria, Germany

Coordinates: 48°59′17″N 13°17′54″E

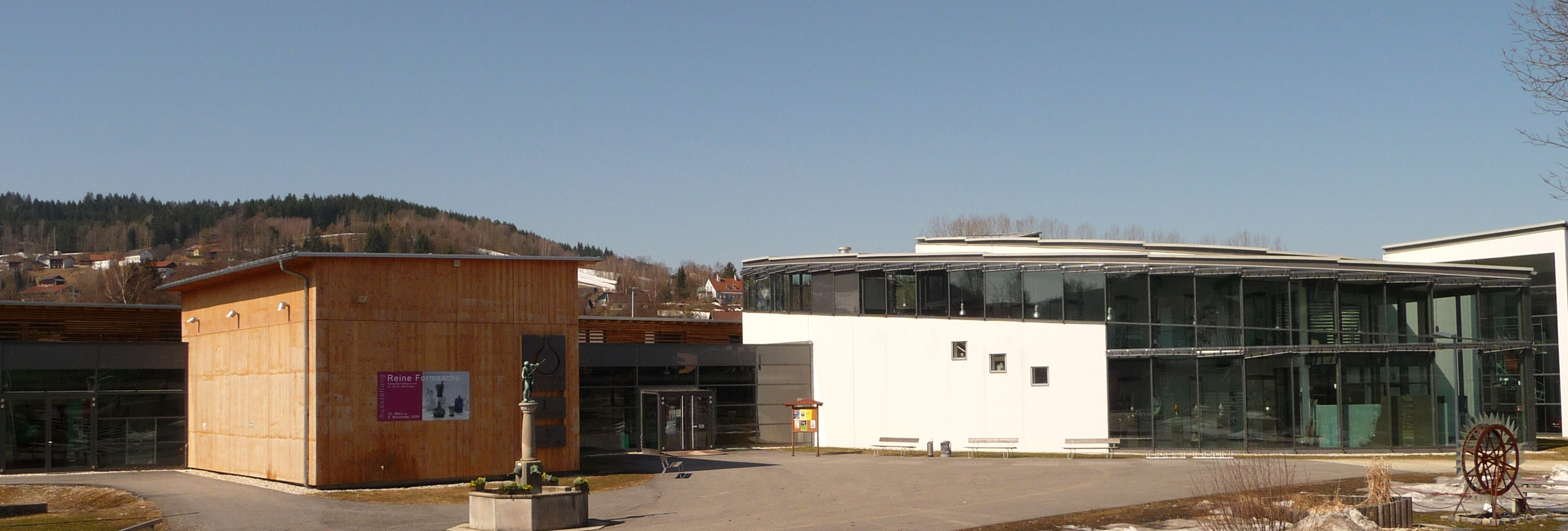
The Frauenau Glass Museum

The Frauenau Glass Museum (German: Glasmuseum Frauenau) in Frauenau in the Lower Bavarian county of Regen, previously a communal facility, has become a state-owned organisation since early 2014 called the State Museum of the History of Glass Culture (Staatliches Museum zur Geschichte der Glaskultur) run by the Free State of Bavaria. The museum curator is the art-historian, Karin Rühl.

The museum was opened on 6 May 1975 by the founder of the museum, Alfons Hannes, in the presence of numerous international glass artists, including Erwin Eisch, Harvey Littleton and Sybren Valkema, with the highly regarded special exhibition Venini-Murano (Wolfgang Kermer collection).

== Donation Wolfgang Kermer ==
In 1982, the museum received a significant donation from the private studio glass collection of Wolfgang Kermer. A selection from this collection had already been shown in a special exhibition from 1976 to 1977 and then remained, considerably expanded, in the museum as a gift from Wolfgang Kermer. As the Bayerische Staatszeitung wrote in 2009, the Wolfgang Kermer collection is ″a cornerstone of the museum′s permanent exhibition″.

The following artists are represented in the donation:

- Belgium: Georges Collignon, Louis Leloup
- Denmark: Per Lütken
- Germany: Erwin Eisch, Aloys Ferdinand Gangkofner, Max Gangkofner, Konrad Habermeier, Hans Klein, Kristian Klepsch, Rosemarie Lierke, Hanns Model, Klaus Moje and Isgard Moje-Wohlgemuth, Helmut Rotter, Albin Schaedel, Bernhard Schagemann, Gerhard Schechinger, Horst Stauber, Wilhelm Wagenfeld, Karl Wiedmann, Aloys Wudy, Jörg F Zimmermann
- Finland: Kaj Franck, Kerttu Nurminen, Heikki Orvola, Timo Sarpaneva, Nanny Still-McKinney, Oiva Toikka, Helena Tynell, Tapio Wirkkala
- France: Michel Bouchard, Jean-Paul van Lith, Claude Monod, Isabelle Monod, Claude Morin, Nicolas Morin, Jean-Claude Novaro
- United Kingdom: Samuel J. Herman, Karlin Rushbrooke, Pauline Solven, Fleur Tookey
- Italy: Sergio Asti, Angelo Barovier, Ercole Barovier, Enrico Capuzzo, Mirko Casaril, Gino Cenedese, Giorgio Ferro, Luciano Gaspari, Peter Pelzel, Alessandro Pianon, Carlo Scarpa, Tobia Scarpa, Archimede Seguso, Ermanno Toso, Paolo Venini, Gino Vistosi, Vittorio Zecchin
- Japan: Kyohei Fujita
- Netherlands: Andries Dirk Copier, Willem Heesen, Yje Theo Jansen, Floris Meydam, Sybren Valkema
- Norway: Hanna Hellum, Benny Motzfeldt
- Poland: Halina Jastrzębowska-Sigmund, Tasios Kiriazopoulos, Henryk Albin Tomaszewski, Henry Wilkowsi, Alina Wołowska
- Sweden: Olle Alberius, Gunnar Cyrén, Edward Hald, Erik Höglund, Ulrica Hydman Vallien, Jan Johansson, Paul Kedelv, John-Orwar Lake, Nils Landberg, Ingeborg Lundin, Edvin Öhrström, Bengt Orup, Sven Palmquist, John Selbing, Gerda Strömberg, Bertil Vallien, Göran Wärff, Ann Wolff
- Czech Republic: Jindra Beranek, Josef Flek sen., Petr Foltýn, Vladimir Jelinek, Ladislav Oliva, Ladislav Paleček, René Roubiček, Ludovica Smrčková, František Špinar, Jaroslav Svoboda jun., Dana Vachtová, Karel Vaňura, František Vízner
- United States: Robert Coleman, Claire Falkenstein, Jack Ink, Marvin Lipofsky, Harvey K. Littleton, Charles Lotton, Joel Philip Myers

== Literature ==
- Alfons Hannes (mit Beiträgen von Wolfgang Kermer und Erwin Eisch): Die Sammlung Wolfgang Kermer, Glasmuseum Frauenau: Glas des 20. Jahrhunderts; 50er bis 70er Jahre (= Bayerische Museen; 9). Schnell & Steiner, München, Zürich 1989 ISBN 3-7954-0753-2.
- Roman Eder, Alfons Hannes: Frauenau, Chronik eines Bayerwalddorfes. 2 vols. Morsak, 1999.
- Katharina Eisch-Angus: Glas im Kontext. Konzeption und Realisierung des neuen Glasmuseums Frauenau. In: Museumsgestaltung. Qualität als Schlüssel der Besucherorientierung. Berichtsband des Oö. Museumstags 2008 in Wels. Hrsg. vom Verbund österreichischer Museen. Leonding/Austria, 2009, S. 14–25, uni-graz.at (pdf; 1.2 MB)
- Katharina Eisch-Angus: Mit dem Glas stirbt Kultur. Europäische Transformationsprozesse im Spiegel der Glasmacherei bis zur Gegenwart. In: Heidrun Alzheimer (ed.): In Europa – Kulturelle Netzwerke lokal, regional, global (= Veröffentlichungen für Volkskunde und Kulturgeschichte, Vol. 104). Wurzburg, 2012, pp. 37–57, glashaus-magazin.de (pdf; 651 kB)
- Michael Schmidt: Es war Vieles möglich! Alfons Hannes (1931–2010). Riedlhütte, 2011.
- Sven Bauer: Glasmuseum Frauenau – Staatliches Museum zur Geschichte der Glaskultur. Kunstverlag Josef Fink, Lindenberg im Allgäu, 2017.
