= Louis Leloup =

Belgian stained-glass artist (1929–2025)

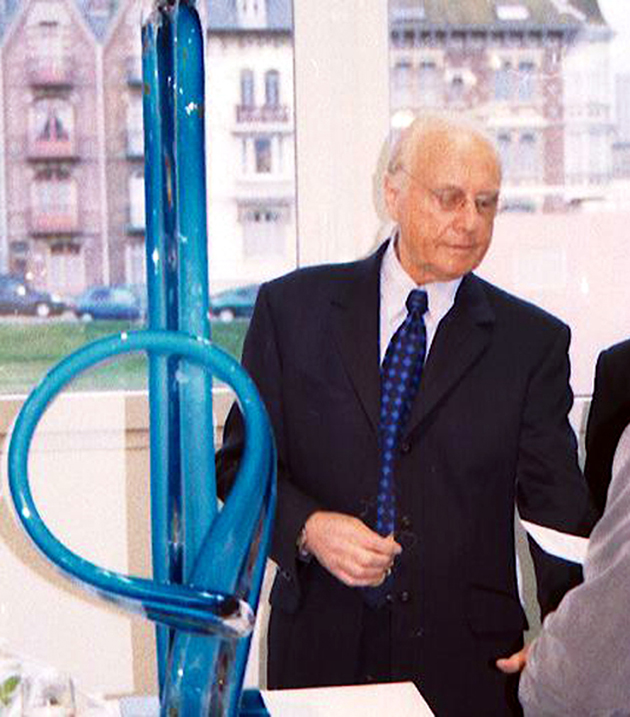
- Leloup in 2003
- Born: 17 January 1929; Seraing, Belgium
- Died: 12 August 2025 (aged 96)
- Occupation: Stained-glass artist

Louis Leloup (17 January 1929 – 12 August 2025) was a Belgian stained-glass artist.

== Life and career ==
Leloup was a teacher at the École des Cristalleries du Val Saint-Lambert from 1958 to 1971 and notably presented the stained-glass window Madone de la Lumière to Pope John Paul II in 2003.

Leloup died on 12 August 2025, at the age of 96.

The glass collector Wolfgang Kermer was one of the first to become aware of Louis Leloup, to visit him in his studio, which was still located in a garage in Seraing, and to acquire one of his first studio glass objects (today in the Wolfgang Kermer Collection, Frauenau Glass Museum).

== Honours ==
- Knight of the Order of Leopold (2014)
- Officer of the Order of Merit of Wallonia (2014)

== Bibliography ==
- Die Sammlung Wolfgang Kermer, Glasmuseum Frauenau: Glas des 20. Jahrhunderts; 50er bis 70er Jahre (by Alfons Hannes, Wolfgang Kermer, and Erwin Eisch, 1989)
- Louis Leloup (by Paul Caso, 1990)
- Louis Leloup 50 ans d’art (by José Brouwers, 1997)
