= La Rochere =

French glass manufacturer

- Native name: Verrerie de La Rochère
- Industry: Glassware
- Founded: 1475
- Headquarters: Passavant-la-Rochère, France
- Website: www.larochere.com

La Rochere is the oldest continuously working glass factory in Europe located in the forests of the Lorraine and Franche-Comté regions that provided firewood for furnaces and ferns, the ashes of which made the potash necessary for the glass fusion.

== History ==
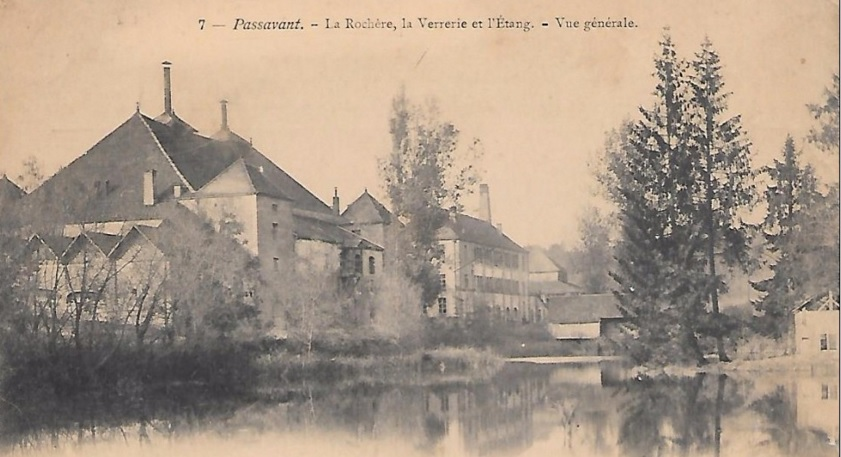
La Rochere

In 1475 the founder Simon de Thysac, "Gentleman glassmaker", obtained permission to manufacture glasses at the "Rochiers", this is preserved in the National Archive in France. The production site is opened and the "hand made" manufacture of crystal glasses is shown and explained to visitors.

== Workshops by the studio glass artist Jörg F. Zimmermann ==
At the suggestion of the collectors France and Wolfgang Kermer in 2003, La Rochere organized workshops with the German studio glass artist Jörg F. Zimmermann every year until 2019. Numerous visitors were always able to witness how Zimmermann worked freely in collaboration with glassblowers from the glassworks, creating his ″Wabengläser″ (″honeycomb glasses″), which established his international reputation.

== See also ==
- List of oldest companies
