= Claire Falkenstein =

American sculptor, painter, printmaker, jewelry designer, and teacher (1908–1997)

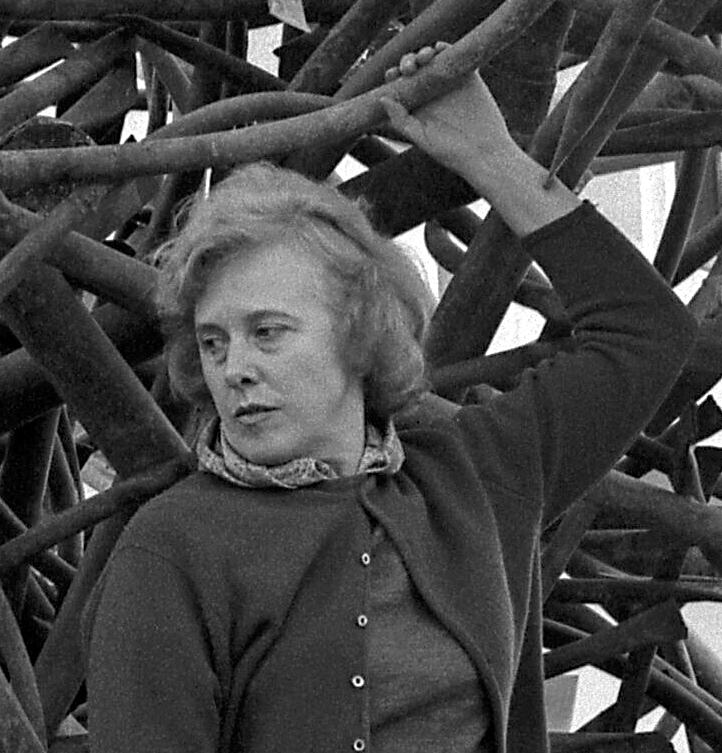
- Claire Falkenstein, 1965
- Born: July 22, 1908; Coos Bay, Oregon
- Died: October 23, 1997 (aged 89); Venice, California
- Known for: Sculpture, painting
- Awards: Los Angeles Times Woman of the Year for Art Award, 1969 Guggenheim Fellowship, 1978 Women's Caucus for Art Lifetime Achievement Award

Claire Falkenstein (/ˈfɑːlkənˌstaɪn/; July 22, 1908 – October 23, 1997) was an American sculptor, painter, printmaker, jewelry designer, and teacher, most renowned for her often large-scale abstract metal and glass public sculptures. Falkenstein was one of America's most experimental and productive 20th-century artists.

Falkenstein explored media, techniques, and processes. Though she was respected among the post–World War II art scene in Europe and the United States, her disregard for the commodification of art coupled with her peripatetic movement from one art metropolis to another made her an elusive figure.

Falkenstein first worked in the San Francisco Bay Area, then in Paris and New York, and finally in Los Angeles. She was involved with art groups as radical as the Gutai Group in Japan and Un Art Autre in Paris and secured a lasting position in the vanguard, which she held until her death in 1997.

An interest in Einstein's theories of the universe inspired Falkenstein to create sculptures from wire and fused glass that explored the concept of infinite space. Falkenstein's current reputation rests on her sculpture, and her work in three dimensions was often radical and ahead of her time.

== Early life and education ==
Claire Falkenstein was born on July 22, 1908, in Coos Bay, Oregon. Her father managed a lumber mill. Claire attended Anna Head School in the Oakland–Berkeley, California, area after her family moved there.

Falkenstein was ethnically German. Her grandfather, Valentine von Falkenstein, a medical student of noble birth from Frankfurt, emigrated to the United States after the German Revolutions of 1848-49 as a political refugee and became a pioneer in Siskiyou County, California. On her mother's side, Falkenstein may be the great-great niece of George Armstrong Custer, but this has not been confirmed.

As a child, Falkenstein would ride her horse in the dark on the beach to see the sun come up and spend time looking at the shells, rocks, seaweed, and driftwood, and these nature forms inspired her sculpture.

Falkenstein attended the University of California at Berkeley, and graduated in 1930 with a major in art and minors in anthropology and philosophy. She had her first one-woman exhibition, at a San Francisco gallery, even before graduation. Her art education continued in the early 1930s at Mills College, where she took a master class with Alexander Archipenko, and met László Moholy-Nagy and György Kepes.

== Style ==
=== Topology ===
Claire Falkenstein used the term “topology” to describe how she creates art. Topology itself is a term in mathematics when discussing the relations between objects and space, and in a non-mathematical sense it means how things interact with each other. Now, Falkenstein adopted the mathematical term “Topology” to describe how her sculptures are relative to the space around them. Falkenstein not only uses topology in terms of the math around her sculptures but specifically the form of a “u” to create many of her sculptures.

In many of her pieces, one being “U” as a Set at the California International Sculpture Symposium held at California State University, Long Beach in 1965, she used the form of “u’s” in her pieces to create a larger form of a “u”. “U” as a Set was created much like her other works by using copper pipes, though varying in length and diameter. Tying back to topology, this piece creates a flowing and “airy” response that both interacts with its surroundings and contradicts it. Two years after the symposium, the piece was moved in front of the Macintosh building at California State University, Long Beach, a modernist building made out of brick. The conflicting simplicity of the building and the complexity/fluidity of the sculpture creates a blank red background to assess the work. It also allows for the full effect of the topological style to take form, as you can see the working forces of the all the combined, abstract “u” forms of the copper pipes interact with each other and the air around it to create the feeling of dynamism, and the overall shape of another abstract “u”. Similarly, this technique was used in all 41 pieces of her series Point as a Set, which also uses hollow copper tubes and fragments in the shape of abstract “u’s” to create pieces that suggest movement thus interacting with space around them.

== Life and work ==
=== San Francisco ===
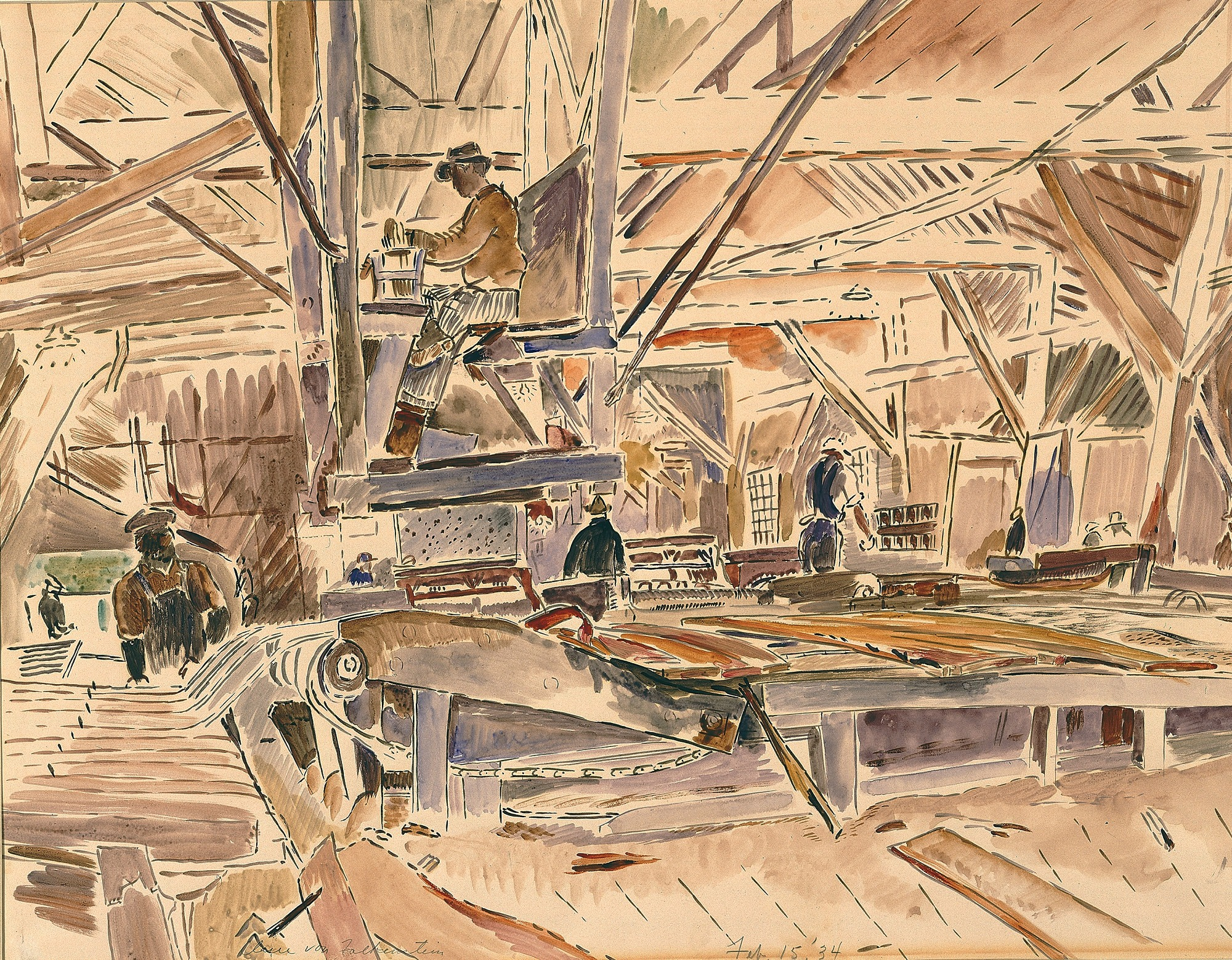
Inside a Lumber Mill (1934), watercolor for the Public Works of Art Project

Falkenstein's experience with those artists reinforced her interest in abstraction, as well as ideas that functional considerations do not detract from a work's aesthetic appeal, and that she was free to experiment with a wide variety of new techniques and materials.

She taught art classes at various Bay Area locations, such as UC Berkeley Extension, Mills College, and the California Labor School. She also taught at the innovative California School of Fine Arts, alongside abstract expressionists such as Clyfford Still, who would become a close friend and artistic influence, and Richard Diebenkorn. In 1934, she created an abstract fresco at Oakland's Piedmont High School. This was part of the Federal Art Project, which strongly preferred paintings depicting American scenes, but some abstracts such as this work by Falkenstein were tolerated. During the 1930s she created sculptures from clay ribbons formed into Möbius strips, woven together. These were some of the earliest American nonobjective sculptures. Her series of wooden sculptures called Exploded Volumes date from the first half of the 1940s. These were made of movable parts that could be combined in different ways by the viewer.

Falkenstein married Irish-American lawyer Richard Francis McCarthy on July 14, 1934, in Alameda, California. They were married for 22 years. They had known each other in high school; they were divorced because he didn't join her in her desire to live in Paris.

=== Paris ===
Falkenstein did move to Paris in 1950 and remained for thirteen years, maintaining a studio on the Left Bank. In Paris she met many artists, including Jean Arp, Alberto Giacometti, Sam Francis and Paul Jenkins, as well as art connoisseur Michel Tapié who acted as a sort of mentor and promoter for the Americans.

In a 1995 interview, she said that "Paris was a remarkable experience, because the French allowed a kind of individual action. They have the quality of centuries of ... culture and of art and it sort of spills over." She explored what she referred to as "topology", a connection between matter and space, incorporating a concept of the continuous void in nature. She became associated with the free-form abstractions of L'Art Informel, the French counterpart of American Abstract Expressionism.

Out of economic necessity, Falkenstein inventively used inexpensive nontraditional materials for her artwork, including wooden logs, stovepipe wire, and lead bars. She used stovepipe wire, in particular, in innovative ways, and continued to do so even after she was able to afford other materials. The large, airy forms constructed of this material became part of her famous style.

Rather than sculpture, she preferred the use of the word structure to refer to her work. She applied the term to her paintings and prints as well. A critic compared Falkenstein's work of the 1950s to "a Jackson Pollock in three dimensions". Some of her work has a structure which appears as if it could grow, infinitely expanding, similar to the way Pollock's paintings may appear as if they could continue beyond the canvas.

In 1954 the Galleria Montenapoleone in Milan held a major solo exhibition of her work, and four years later, she was asked to make the railing of the Galleria Spazio in Rome. On this occasion she inserted pieces of colored glass in an open, grid-like structure of soldered metal.

One of her most well-known pieces is The New Gates of Paradise, constructed of metal webbing with chunks of glass. Located on the Grand Canal at the Guggenheim Museum in Venice, Italy, it had been commissioned in 1960 by her friend Peggy Guggenheim. The gates, each of which was 12 by 4 feet (3.7 m × 1.2 m), marked the first time she created a never-ending screen with repeating modules attached in various directions, giving the impression that it could continue forever.

Falkenstein was also commissioned to create welded gates for the sea villa of the Princess Luciana Pignatelli.

Falkenstein's jewelry was the subject of her 1961 solo exhibition at the Louvre's Musée des Arts Decoratifs.

=== Los Angeles ===
Envelope (1958), Smithsonian American Art Museum

By the late 1950s, Falkenstein was back in San Francisco, teaching at the San Francisco Art Institute. Through a student, Helen Burke, she met composer Terry Riley, who produced with Pauline Oliveros and Loren Rush an improvised soundtrack to her short film “Polyester Moon”. The film was already complete visually in 1957, but the musicians were brought in for postproduction in 1958.

In 1963, Falkenstein moved to the Venice district of Los Angeles, building an oceanfront home/studio. Falkenstein received many high-profile commissions for large public art pieces, including sculptures, fountains, and screens. In 1965, she created "U" as a Set for the International Sculpture Symposium held on the campus of California State University, Long Beach and in 1969 she created the doors, gates, and stained-glass windows for St. Basil Catholic Church on Wilshire Boulevard in Los Angeles. The three-dimensional windows are considered by some to be her finest achievements. She said of the windows: "To my knowledge, they're the only abstract windows for a Catholic church." Among the other southern California venues featuring her works are Fresno's Fulton Mall, South Coast Plaza, the Department of Motor Vehicles in downtown Los Angeles, and various college campuses including California State University, Fullerton (she described her sculpture there as "metallic joy – an activity of forces"), California State University, Dominguez Hills, University of California, Los Angeles, University of Southern California, and California State University, Long Beach.

In 1969, the Los Angeles Times distinguished Claire Falkenstein as "Woman of the Year."

The Long Beach Museum of Art named its restaurant "Claire's at the Museum" in honor of Falkenstein. The artist created Structure and Flow, a fountain with twisting latticework, which was donated to the museum in 1972. This work of art, the restaurant's centerpiece, is another creation which many consider to be among her finest.

In the 1970s, Claire Falkenstein also created sculptural glass objects in collaboration with the famous glass factory Salviati in Venice.

In 1977, the film: "Claire Falkenstein, Sculptor" was created by Jae Carmichael.

She was awarded a Guggenheim Fellowship for Fine Arts in 1978. From about 1990 on, her work was concentrated on painting rather than sculpture. Falkenstein died at her Venice home on October 23, 1997, of stomach cancer, at the age of 89. Over the course of her long career as an artist she had produced over 4,000 sculptures, paintings and drawings.

== Art work ==
Claire Falkenstein contributed her sculpture “U” as a Set to the 1965 California International Sculpture Symposium (CISS). “U” as a Set measures 12’4” x 19’ x 12’10” and is made from 6,000 pounds of copper tubes and pipes that were bent and welded with each piece of material varied in diameter and length. The individual pieces of the sculpture resemble stylized versions of the letter “u”. Instead of the traditional shape of the letter “u”, Falkenstein used her expressive method to make the pipes form the shape she wanted. The pieces are welded together to create a form that can be seen as twisting the letter “u”. Originally, Falkenstein was going to use iron pipes instead of copper but copper pipes are less brittle which makes them easier to bend. Copper also doesn’t rust the same as iron and because of the oxidation process in copper it turns green over time. The sculpture is placed in front of the McIntosh Humanities building in a fountain pond at California State University, Long Beach.

The sculpture “U” as a Set was made based on memories of Falkenstein's childhood as the sculpture is said to mimic bramble bushes and birds' nests that she remembers. Falkenstein explored and manipulated three dimensional space using her topological structure. She described her work as a topological sculpture due to the curving pipes and tubes that embody the idea of penetration and surfacing. She combined her styles by using many signs representing small stylized letters “u” in copper and shaped them together in place to create a large ensemble bigger than the person. During the process of creation Falkenstein had little assistance from the industry to help her with sculpture.

Louis Stern Fine Arts mounted a major show of her work in 2006. A 128-page catalogue was produced. In 2016 her biography was included in the exhibition catalogue Women of Abstract Expressionism organized by the Denver Art Museum. Her work was included in the 2021 exhibition Women in Abstraction at the Centre Pompidou.

== Exhibitions ==
A small selection of Falkenstein's exhibitions:

- 1948 Salon des Réalités Nouvelles
- 1970 Drawing and Performance, E.A.T SHOW, University of Southern California Fisher Gallery
- 1970 Art and Technology, Brooklyn Museum
- 1974 California Museum of Science and Industry
- 1975 Phoenix Art Museum
- 1977 San Francisco Museum of Modern Art
- 1978 Tate Gallery
- 1979 Seattle Art Museum
- 1980 Palm Springs Desert Museum
- 1981, 1985 Laguna Art Museum
- 1987 Peggy Guggenheim's Other Legacy, Solomon R. Guggenheim Museum
- 1992 Museum of Contemporary Art (Los Angeles)
- 1994 Corcoran Gallery
- 1995 46th International Art Exhibition, Venice Biennale
- 1997 Claire Falkenstein, Looking Within: A Point of Departure, Fresno Art Museum
- 2002 True Grit – Seven Female Visionaries Before Feminism, Boise Art Museum (Boise, Idaho)
- 2006 Claire Falkenstein: Structure and Flow: Works from 1950-1980, Louis Stern Fine Arts
- 2007 Be-Bomb: the Transatlantic War of Images and all that Jazz. 1946–1956, Barcelona Museum of Contemporary Art
- 2008 Modernism and the Wichner Collection, Long Beach Museum of Art
- 2009 Craft in America: Expanding Traditions, Fuller Craft Museum (Brockton, Massachusetts)
- 2012 Claire Falkenstein: An Expansive Universe, part of Pacific Standard Time: Art in L.A. 1945 – 1980, Jack Rutberg Fine Arts (Los Angeles, California)
- 2012 Black And – -, Anita Shapolsky Gallery, New York City, NY

== Collections ==
Falkenstein's work is in many museum collections, including:

- Addison Gallery of American Art
- University Art Museum at California State University, Long Beach
- Coos Art Museum
- Crocker Art Museum
- Frauenau Glass Museum (Donation Wolfgang Kermer)
- Hammer Museum
- Harvard Art Museums
- Indianapolis Museum of Art
- Long Beach Museum of Art
- Los Angeles County Museum of Art
- Museum of Art and Archaeology (University of Missouri)
- Nora Eccles Harrison Museum of Art
- Norton Simon Museum
- Oakland Museum of California
- Peggy Guggenheim Collection
- Pompidou Centre
- Portland Art Museum
- San Diego Museum of Art
- San Francisco Museum of Modern Art
- Seattle Art Museum
- Smithsonian American Art Museum
- Tate Britain
- University of Michigan Museum of Art

== Sources ==
- Henderson, Maren (2006). Claire Falkenstein: Structure and Flow, Works from 1950–1980 (PDF). West Hollywood, California: Louis Stern Fine Arts. ISBN 0-9749421-5-4. Archived from the original (PDF) on July 13, 2011. https://www.amazon.com/Structure-Flow-1950-1980-Louis-Stern/dp/0974942154
- Rubinstein, Charlotte Streifer (1982). American Women Artists: from Early Indian Times to the Present. New York, N.Y: Avon. ISBN 0-8161-8535-2.
