= Cendrecourt =

- Commune
- Location of Cendrecourt
- Location within France Location within Bourgogne-Franche-Comté
- Coordinates: 47°50′41″N 5°55′37″E
- Country: France
- Region: Bourgogne-Franche-Comté
- Department: Haute-Saône
- Arrondissement: Vesoul
- Canton: Jussey

Government
  - Mayor (2020–2026): Philippe Billerey
- Area^{1}: 9.31 km^{2} (3.59 sq mi)
- Highest elevation: 293 m (961 ft)
- Lowest elevation: 211 m (692 ft)
- Population (2023): 200
  - Density: 21/km^{2} (56/sq mi)
- Time zone: UTC+01:00 (CET)
  - Summer (DST): UTC+02:00 (CEST)
- INSEE/Postal code: 70114 /70500
- ^{1} French Land Register data, which excludes lakes, ponds, glaciers > 1 km^{2} (0.386 sq mi or 247 acres) and river estuaries.

Cendrecourt (French pronunciation: [sɑ̃dʁəkuʁ]) is a commune in the Haute-Saône department in the region of Bourgogne-Franche-Comté in eastern France.

== Notable people ==
- Wolfgang Kermer

== See also ==
- Communes of the Haute-Saône department
