= Sybren Valkema =

Dutch glass artist

- Born: August 13, 1916; The Hague, Netherlands
- Died: February 15, 1996 (aged 79); Blaricum, Netherlands
- Other name: Iep Valkema
- Occupations: Artist, Designer, Educator, Director and Deputy-director of the Gerrit Rietveld Academy in Amsterdam
- Known for: Founder, The European Studio Glass Movement, Free Glass (Vrij Glas, in Dutch)

Sybren Valkema (1916–1996) was a Dutch glass artist and teacher, and founder of the European Studio Glass Movement, also known as VRIJ GLAS (Free Glass).

== Background and education ==
Sybren Valkema was raised in an anthroposophic, artistic and politically left-wing environment, his parents were both cultural and socially engaged. His decision to teach was made early, and he was trained at modern educational institutions. After receiving his teaching certificate, Valkema studied at the Royal Academy of Art, The Hague to become a drawing teacher. Several years later he took over from Paul Schuitema in the department of advertising design evening classes (The Sybren Valkema Archive and The Netherlands Institute for Art History).

== Drawing and aesthetic design teacher ==
In 1943 he became drawing instructor for the introductory year at IvKNO, Instituut voor Kunstnijverheidsonderwijs (later renamed Gerrit Rietveld Academie), where the director, architect Mart Stam, strived for a progressive higher education for industrial design in the spirit of 'Bauhaus'. That same year, A.D. Copier brought him to Leerdam to become the instructor in 'aesthetic design' for the newly set-up courses at the Leerdam Glass School. It was at this point that Valkema began following the twin path which would influence him, and many others, throughout his career. Yet, during the war, and due to the German occupation, living and working conditions deteriorated; in 1944 classes were suspended.

Following the liberation in 1945, Valkema received an appointment in Amsterdam as lecturer in pattern design for the departement of textile, weaving & fashion. His first designs were included in an exhibition at the Stedelijk Museum Amsterdam in 1946; in that year he also became lecturer in composition and design studies at the IvKNO department of ceramics in Amsterdam. In the summer of 1945, classes resumed at Leerdam: Valkema was a highly appreciated teacher and an important cultural influence on his students (decorators, designers, glassmakers). Here he gradually developed into a designer himself, making his own contributions to product innovation.

== Designer ==
In the early 1950s Sybren Valkema received his first royalty contract and a greater opportunity to work with the 'masters' in the glass factory. Valkema's well-known set of table glass from that period include Compact, Palma and Penta. He also took part in the 'Leerdam' contributions to an increasing number of international exhibitions - including the 'Expo 58' World Fair in Brussels, where the entire Leerdam pavilion was awarded the 'Grand Prix'. In addition to series production, the 1950s also saw him designing 'Unica', which were included in the official registration of 'Leerdam Unica' as from 1957. A significant intermezzo was his role in the 'Experimental Department' at 'De Porceleyne Fles' ceramics factory in Delft from 1956 to 1963, where he actively led the design and decorative innovation activities. The same period saw Valkema also creating many ceramics 'unica' himself, which were shown at a large number of international exhibitions.

== IvKNO and The Gerrit Rietveld Academy ==
As acting director and deputy director of the IvKNO Instituut voor Kunstnijverheidsonderwijs (later renamed Gerrit Rietveld Academy), Sybren Valkema bore special responsibility over a period of 10 years for the preparations for the new academy building, designed by architect Gerrit Rietveld. As a member of official committees and through the IvKNO and the Gerrit Rietveld Academy, he became increasingly involved in the currents of change going on in art education.

== First congress of world craftsmen ==
As a representative of the Dutch Ministry of Culture Sybren Valkema took part in the charter meeting of the World Crafts Council in New York 1964, where he immediately recognised the possibilities for free glass making as offered by the small-scale furnace developed by Dominick Labino and presented by Harvey Littleton. After which Sybren Valkema became the first artist in Europe to build such a glass furnace at an art academy. Åsa Brandt from Sweden was the first glass student, later followed by Ulla Forsell, Anna Carlgren, and many more until his retirement in 1981.

== Nestor of Free Glass ==
Instead of adopting the American term 'Studio Glass' Sybren Valkema introduced the term VRIJ GLAS, or Free Glass. In 1967 Sybren Valkema organised the first European exhibition of 'Free Glass', including work by Erwin Eisch, Sam Herman, Harvey Littleton, Marvin Lipofsky and Valkema himself in Museum Boijmans Van Beuningen, Gemeentemuseum Arnhem and Groninger Museum. After which, and at the invitation of Harvey Littleton, Valkema went to the University of Wisconsin in 1968 to teach 'European Glass Techniques' and introduced the use of color rods. His experiences in the United States helped provide the model basis for the 'Glass Work Group' at the Rietveld Academy.

From the 1970s to the 1990s, he took part in exhibitions, seminars and symposiums throughout the world. After his retirement from the Rietveld Academy he worked in numerous glass studios in Europe and the United States. His own workshop in Blaricum was regularly expanded and remodelled with the help of his son Durk Valkema. As early as 1968, Valkema received a Royal decoration for his contributions in the Netherlands, which he would have refused had he been informed. In 1986 the Glasmuseet Ebeltoft honoured him by founding 'The Sybren Valkema Honorary Prize'. In 1987 Sybren Valkema was the first to receive the 'Friends Award' from the Dutch Association of Friends of Modern Glass. And in Oakland, California, on March 17, 1994, he received the 'Lifetime Achievement Award' from the Glass Art Society.
