= Sam Herman =

English artist (1936–2020)

Samuel J. Herman
- Born: 25 July 1936; Mexico City, Mexico
- Died: 29 November 2020 (aged 84); Lechlade, Gloucestershire
- Other name: Sam Herman
- Occupations: Glass artist, sculptor and painter

Sam Herman was contemporary glass artist, sculptor and painter. One of Harvey Littleton's first students, Herman is credited as one of the founders of the Studio Glass movement in Great Britain. He was seminal in spreading the idea of the movement through his teaching positions in England, (at the Royal College of Art and the Buckinghamshire College of Higher Education), and Australia (at the Jam Factory Workshops in Adelaide) and through the exhibition of his own sculpture in glass. Through the years the artist has resided and established his personal studio in London, England (1979–90), South Australia (1974–79). From 1993 to his final years he maintained studios in Spain, London and Gloucestershire. Sam was represented by The Frestonian Gallery (London).

Samuel Jacob Herman died 29 November 2020. He is survived by Joanna, whom he married in 2010, his son, David, and daughter, Sarah, from his first marriage, and a granddaughter, Alice

== Early life ==
Samuel J. Herman was born in Mexico City in 1936. His father died when he was an infant and he and his mother moved to the United States when he was six years old. From 1955 to 1959 Herman served in the U.S. Navy. He became a US citizen in 1947.

== Education ==
Herman's art education was first taken at Western Washington University in Bellingham, Washington where he received a Bachelor of Arts in 1962. At the University of Wisconsin-Madison, he studied under Professor Harvey Littleton and the sculptor Leo Steppart . He was awarded the MFA from that institution in 1965. Upon receipt of a scholarship, Herman afterward traveled to Great Britain for study with Helen Turner at the Edinburgh College of Art from 1965 to 1966. After this he became a Research Fellow at the Royal College of Art (RCA) in London from 1966 to 1967, when he was appointed the head of the Glass Department.

== Founder ==
In 1969 Herman established a workshop, The Glasshouse, in London. It was the first glass studio of its kind in Great Britain allowing graduate students to further develop their skills and business acumen. In 1974 he traveled to Australia, where, in cooperation with the South Australian Craft Authority, he set up the glass area at Jam Factory Workshops, Inc. in Adelaide. It was Australia's first hot glass studio. In 1979 Herman returned to England and set up his own glass studio in London, where he worked until 1990.

== Educator ==
Herman headed the Glass Department at the Royal College of Art (RCA) from late 1967 to 1974. He had his first major UK exhibition in 1967 curated by Henry Rothschild at Primavera. In 1971 he had an exhibition at the Victoria and Albert Museum. In 1974, he had his first major exhibition in Germany, curated by Wolfgang Kermer in Stuttgart. His former students include firstly the previous Head of Department, Michael Harris - who left the position which Sam took over to form Mdina Glass in Malta - Peter Aldridge Clifford Rainey, Jane Bruce, Pauline Solven, Annette Meech, Steven Newell and Jiri Suhajek. Herman left the RCA when he was invited by the South Australian government to found the glass studio at Jam Factory Workshops. He spent the next five years in Australia, creating glass sculpture, exhibiting and conducting workshops. When he returned to London in 1979, he took a position as head of the glass area at the Buckinghamshire College of Higher Education (now Buckinghamshire New University), which later named him head of the Ceramics and Glass Department at the school. His tenure ended in 1990, when he took a consulting position with the Cristalleries Val Saint Lambert in Belgium. In addition to his teaching positions in England, Herman taught workshops in the United States at Haystack Mountain School of Crafts (1970), the University of California at Berkeley (1971) and California College of Arts and Crafts (1972–73).

== Collections ==
Herman's work has been collected by the Victoria and Albert Museum, London; Art Gallery of South Australia in Adelaide; the National Gallery of Victoria, in Melbourne; the Art Gallery of Western Australia in Perth; Viennese Glass Museum in Vienna, Austria; Frauenau Glass Museum (Donation Wolfgang Kermer), Germany; the Düsseldorf Art Museum in Ehrenhof, Düsseldorf, Germany; the Royal Scottish Museum in Edinburgh; The Art Institute of Chicago; The Corning Museum of Glass in Corning, New York, the Chazen Museum of Art at the University of Wisconsin-Madison; and the National Museum of American History, Smithsonian Institution, Washington, DC, and The Higgins Art Gallery & Museum, Bedford, UK. Sam Herman featured in the exhibition "Glass, Light, Paint & Clay: Objects from the Graham Cooley Collection" at the Peterborough Museum and Art Gallery from 28 October to 14 December 2017. The catalogue (ISBN 978-1-78808-185-6) features an interview with Sam (conducted by Graham Cooley at the Swindon Museum and art gallery on 27 October 2016) describing his life and work.
