= Coos Art Museum =

Museum in Coos Bay, Oregon, U.S.

Coordinates: 43.3669°N 124.2142°W

Coos Art Museum is a museum in Coos Bay, operating on the southern coast of the U.S. state of Oregon since 1966. It offers exhibitions, art classes, lectures, and community events.

Coos Art Museum is housed in a 1936 Art Deco former U.S. Post Office and is home to six exhibition galleries. Construction of the post office began in January 1936 by Hoffman Construction Company, with it opening in November 1936 at a cost of $127,566. The Museum features between 18 and 25 changing exhibitions annually, including exhibits from its own 554-piece permanent collection of Northwest and contemporary art, which can also be viewed via the museum's website.
