= Walter Pichler (artist) =

Austrian sculptor, artist, architect and designer

- Born: 1936; Deutschnofen, Italy
- Died: 2012 (aged 75–76); Austria
- Occupations: artist architect

Walter Pichler (1 October 1936, Deutschnofen, Italy – 16 July 2012 Burgenland, Austria) was an Austrian sculptor, artist, architect and designer.

== Early life and education ==
Walter Pichler's family was forced to leave Deutschnofen for Austria as part of the South Tyrol Option Agreement. He began his artistic studies at the Kunstgewerbeschule in Innsbruck. In 1955 he graduated from the Vienna University of Applied Art.

== Career ==
From the 1960s onward Pichler's work spanned areas between sculpture and architecture. In 1960 he stayed in Paris for a period of time and in 1963 to New York and Mexico. In 1963 he had his first exhibition, Architecture, along with Hans Hollein at Galerie nächst St. Stephan in St Stephen Vienna.

Pichler created objects and installations that dealt with architectural designs for utopian city models and projects that dealt with space and perception. He developed visionary architectural ideas, at times collaborating with Hollein. Together they wanted to "liberate" architecture from the constraints of building in the 1960s and to detach sculpture form the constraints of frozen abstraction. His Prototypen (prototypes) series, presented in 1967, include his portable TV-Helm, (TV helmets, or living rooms) and his Großer Raum, a pneumatic sculpture.

Pichler exhibited his work at the Museum of Modern Art in New York City in 1967, at the Biennale de Paris, and in Documenta 4 in 1968 in Kassel with three of his Prototypen pieces including Fusion von Kugeln. His work was also included in Documenta 6 in 1977. In 1978 the Israel Museum in Jerusalem presented 74 drawings from the period 1970 to 1978.

In 1972 Pichler bought an old farm in Sankt Martin an der Raab in southern Burgenland where he lived and worked for the rest of his life. He spent more time there than in his Vienna studio and he created his ideal environment for his sculptures. These sculptures were primarily not for sale and he built each its own space. Thus, in addition to the residential building in Sankt Martin, there was, among others, the Haus für den Rumpf und Schädeldecken (House for the Torso and the Skullcaps), the Haus für die Wagen (house for the car), the Haus für das große Kreuz (House for the Big Cross) and the Haus für die zwei Tröge (house for the two troughs). Pichler believed Sankt Martin was the ideal place for his work and reluctantly sent them to exhibitions.

Pichler worked extremely slowly, sometimes it took decades to complete a sculpture as he first made many sketches, scale drawings and plans, and then build models. Time was an important material for him, on equal footing with materials like plastic, clay, wood and various metals such as lead, tin and zinc. Pichler placed great importance on quality craftsmanship and accuracy, repeatedly putting together materials that are difficult to combine.

Pichler earned his living partially by selling sketches, plans and drawings and partially by designing books. He designed books for the publishing house Residenz Verlag, and then for Jung und Jung. He refused teaching at universities and most state grants. Exceptions to this rule was his acceptance of the Tyrolean State Prize, the Grand Austrian State Prize in 1985, an annual award given to an Austrian artist for exceptional work.

== Personal life ==
Pichler was married to Elfi Tripamer, an architectural photographer, and had a daughter, Anna Tripamer.

== Death ==
On July 16, 2012, Pichler died from complications with cancer treatment at age 75.
