= Bernhard Pankok =

German painter

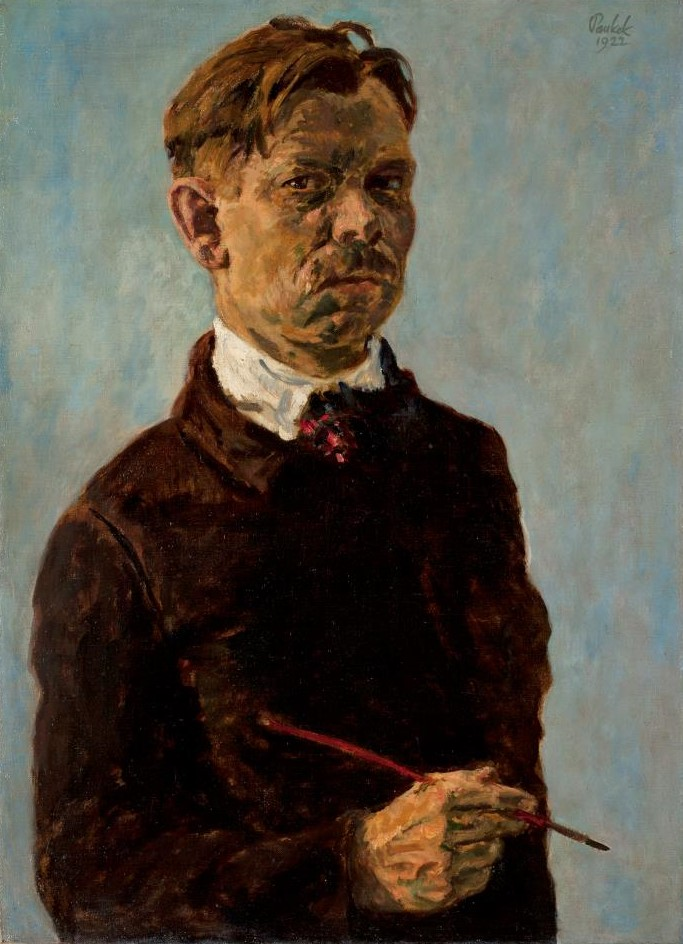
Self-portrait with Brush (1922)

Bernhard Wilhelm Maria Pankok (16 May 1872 in Münster – 5 April 1943 in Baierbrunn) was a German painter, graphic artist, architect, and designer. His works are characterized by the transition between Art Nouveau and the International Style. His furniture and book design, such as the catalog for the German section of the Exposition Universelle (1900) in Paris, have garnered him the most recognition.

== Biography ==
From 1889 to 1891, he studied at the Kunstakademie Düsseldorf, with Heinrich Lauenstein, Adolf Schill, Hugo Crola and Johann Peter Theodor Janssen. He opened a studio in Munich in 1892; working as a freelance artist, graphic designer and illustrator for the magazines Pan and Jugend. He also served as a teacher for his younger brother, Franz, and was one of the co-founders of the Vereinigten Werkstätten für Kunst im Handwerk (United Workshops for Art in Crafts).

In 1901, he married Antoinette Coppenrath (1870–1920), a sister of the landscape painter Ferdinand Coppenrath. The following year, they moved to Stuttgart. In 1907, he became a member of the Berlin Secession and the Deutscher Werkbund. Shortly after, he was involved in the process of creating new buildings for the Academy of Arts. When they opened in 1913, he was named the first Director there, a post he held until 1937.

He was a major participant in the Werkbund Exhibition (1914), in Cologne. He was also elected a member of the board of directors at the Deutscher Künstlerbund. In 1924, he married his second wife, Marianne Geyer (1891–1941).

In 1930, he became a "foreign" member of the Munich Secession. Three years later, he was named an honorary member of the Academy of Fine Arts, Munich. Despite being under a great deal of pressure, he never joined the Nazi Party. In 1942, the newly reorganized State Academy of Fine Arts made him an honorary member.

On the thirtieth anniversary of his death, in 1973, the Landesmuseum Württemberg presented a major retrospective of his works.

== Selected works ==
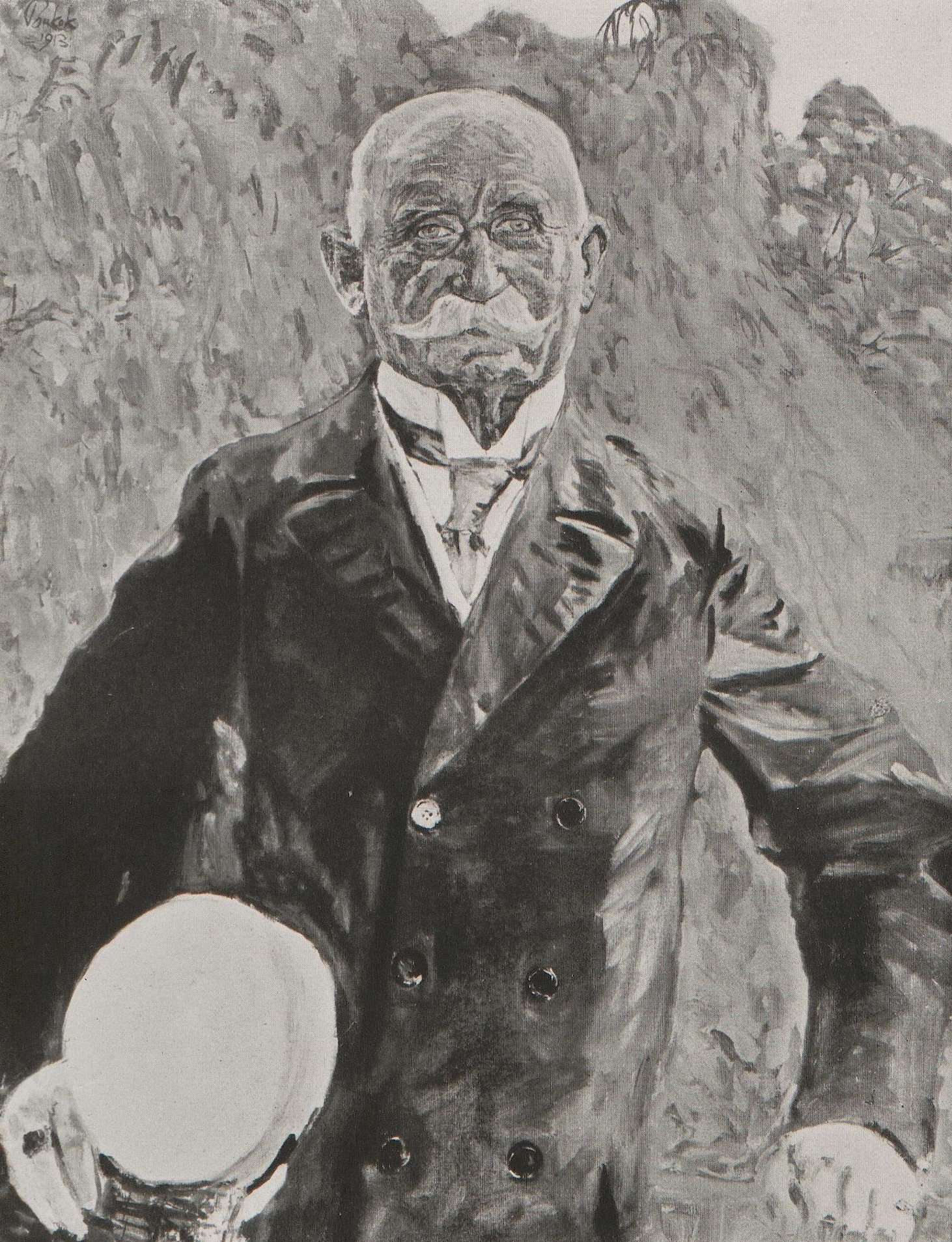
Ferdinand Graf von Zeppelin

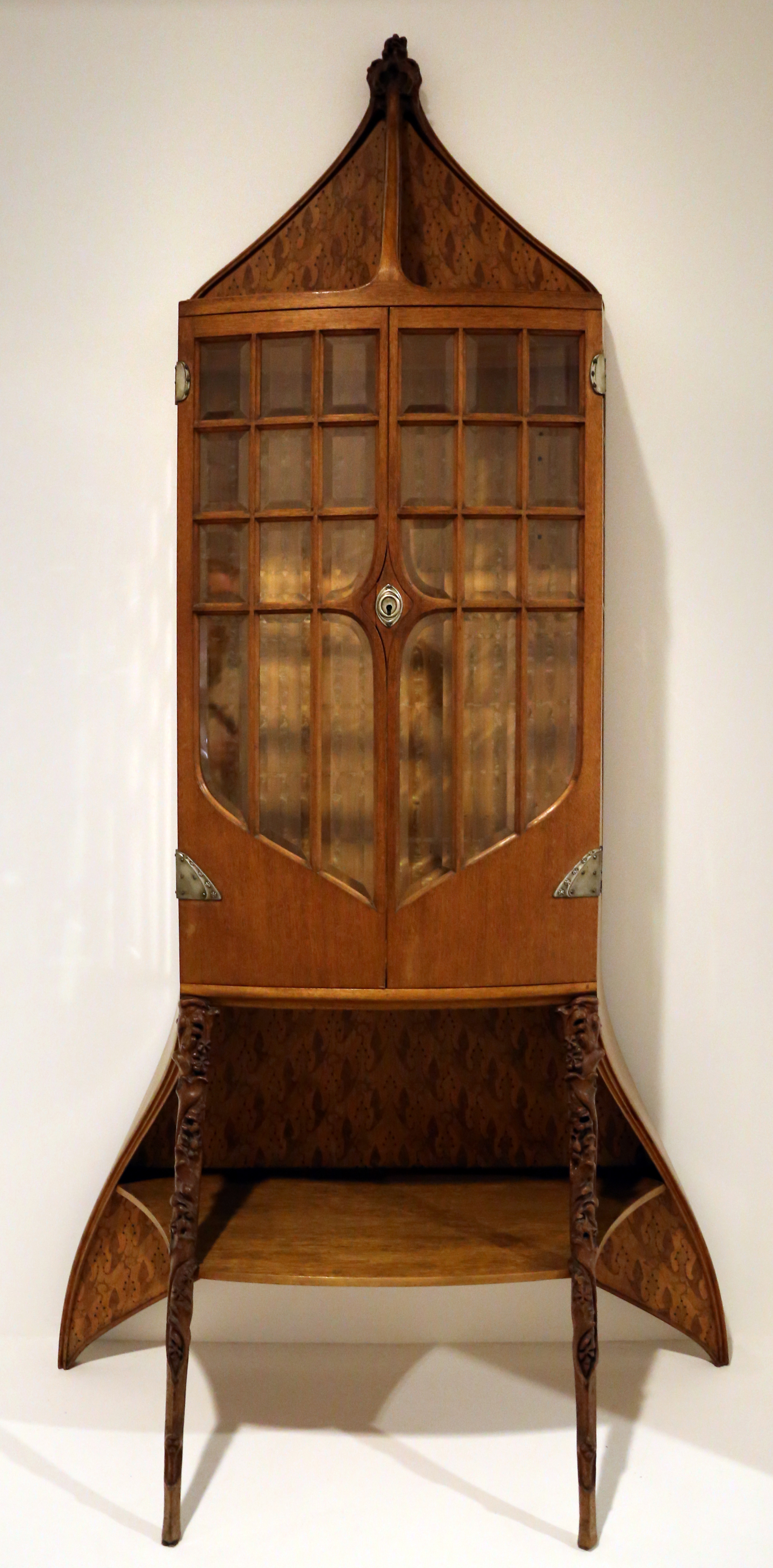
Showcase

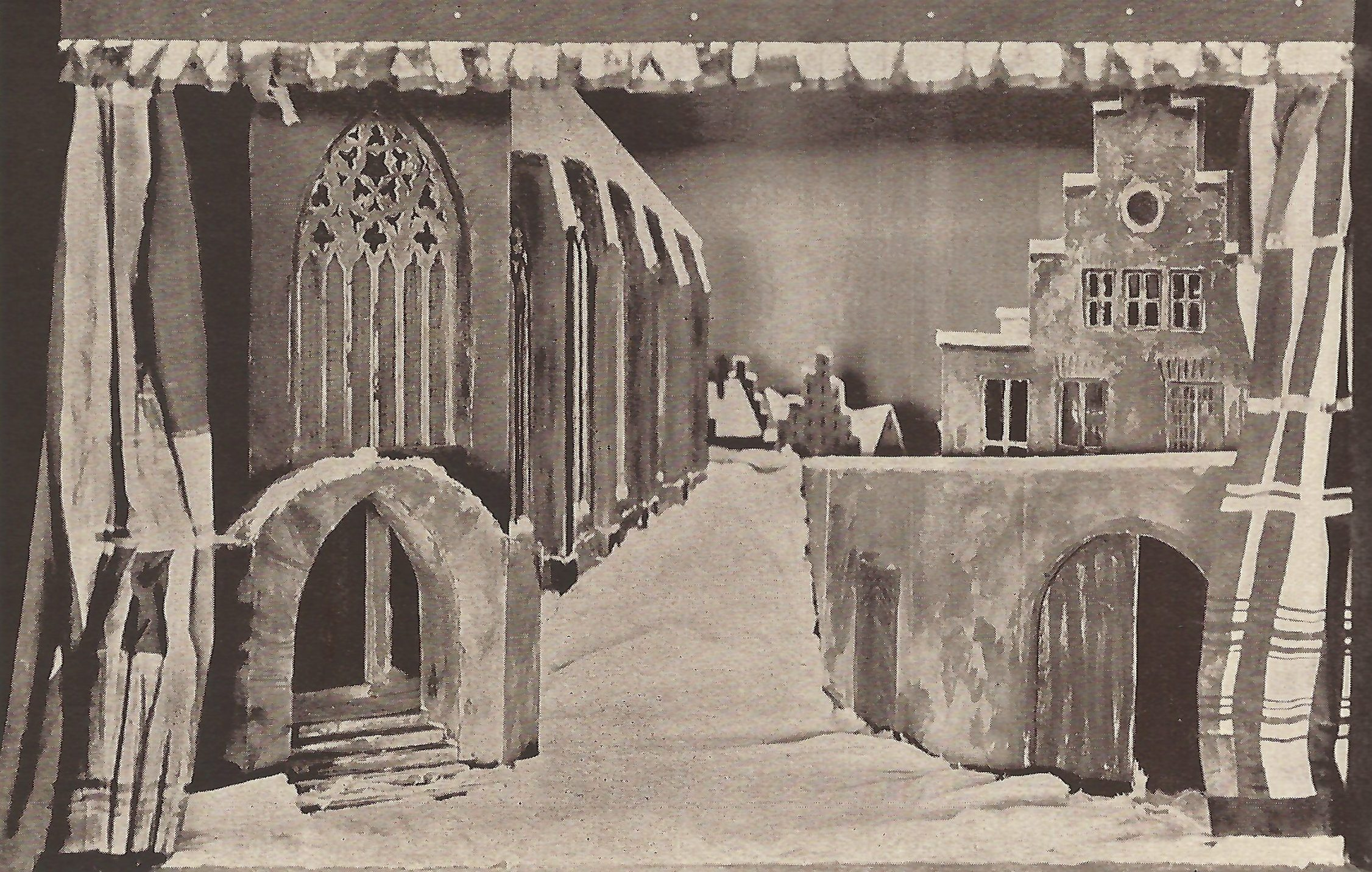
Stage design for Doktor Faust,
by Ferruccio Busoni

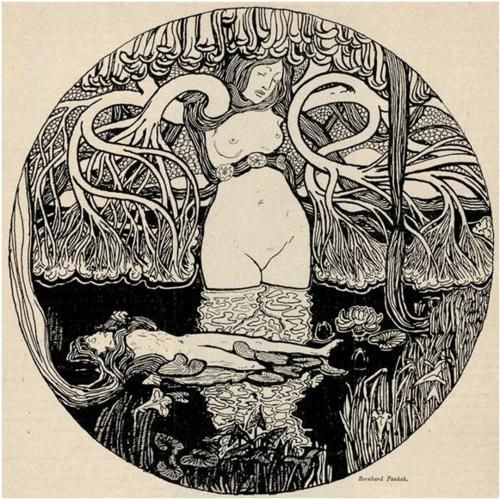
Illustration for Jugend (1896)

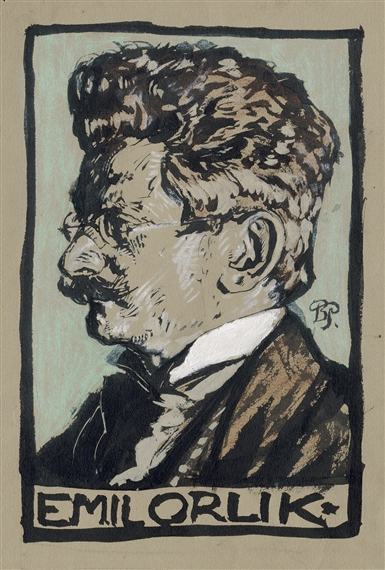
Emil Orlík
