= Saarbrücker Zeitung =

German newspaper in Saarland

- Type: Regional daily newspaper
- Format: Broadsheet
- Owners: Rheinische Post Mediengruppe (56.1 %); Gesellschaft für staatsbürgerliche Bildung Saar mbH (26 %)
- Founder(s): Bernhard and Gottfried Hofer
- Publisher: Saarbrücker Zeitung Verlag und Druckerei
- Editor-in-chief: Peter Stefan Herbst
- Founded: 1761; 265 years ago
- Language: German
- Headquarters: Saarbrücken, Germany
- Circulation: 128,174 (IVW Q4/2017)
- Sister newspapers: Pfälzischer Merkur; Trierischer Volksfreund
- Website: saarbruecker-zeitung.de

The Saarbrücker Zeitung (SZ) is a daily (except Sundays) newspaper published in Saarland, Germany.

== History and profile ==
It was first published as a weekly journal in 1761 under the title Nassau-Saarbrückisches Wochenblatt (Nassau-Saarbrücken Weekly). After several changes in name and frequency, it appeared since 1861 under its current title. After the Saar Treaty in 1956, the Saarland state became its owner. It was privatized in 1969; the paper's major owner (56.1%) was the Holtzbrinck Publishing Group. Rheinische Post Mediengruppe became the majority owner in 2013.

In 2001, Saarbrücker Zeitung received the Konrad Adenauer Foundation Prize for Local Journalism.

Saarbrücker Zeitung had a circulation of 128,174 copies in 2017.
