= Erwin Eisch =

German artist (1927–2022)

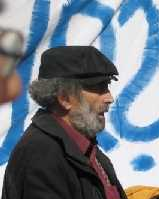
- Eisch in 2008
- Born: 18 April 1927; Frauenau, Bavaria, Weimar Germany
- Died: 25 January 2022 (aged 94); Zwiesel, Bavaria, Germany
- Occupations: Artist, educator
- Known for: Co-founder of the European studio glass movement
- Spouse: Gretel Stadler (m. 1962)
- Children: 5

Erwin Eisch (German: [ˈɛʁviːn ˈʔaɪʃ]; 18 April 1927 – 25 January 2022) was a German artist who worked with glass. He was also a painter, draughtsman, and printmaker. Eisch's work in glass, along with that of his friend and colleague Harvey Littleton, embodies the ideas of the international studio glass movement. Eisch is considered a founder of the studio glass movement in Europe.

== Early life and education ==
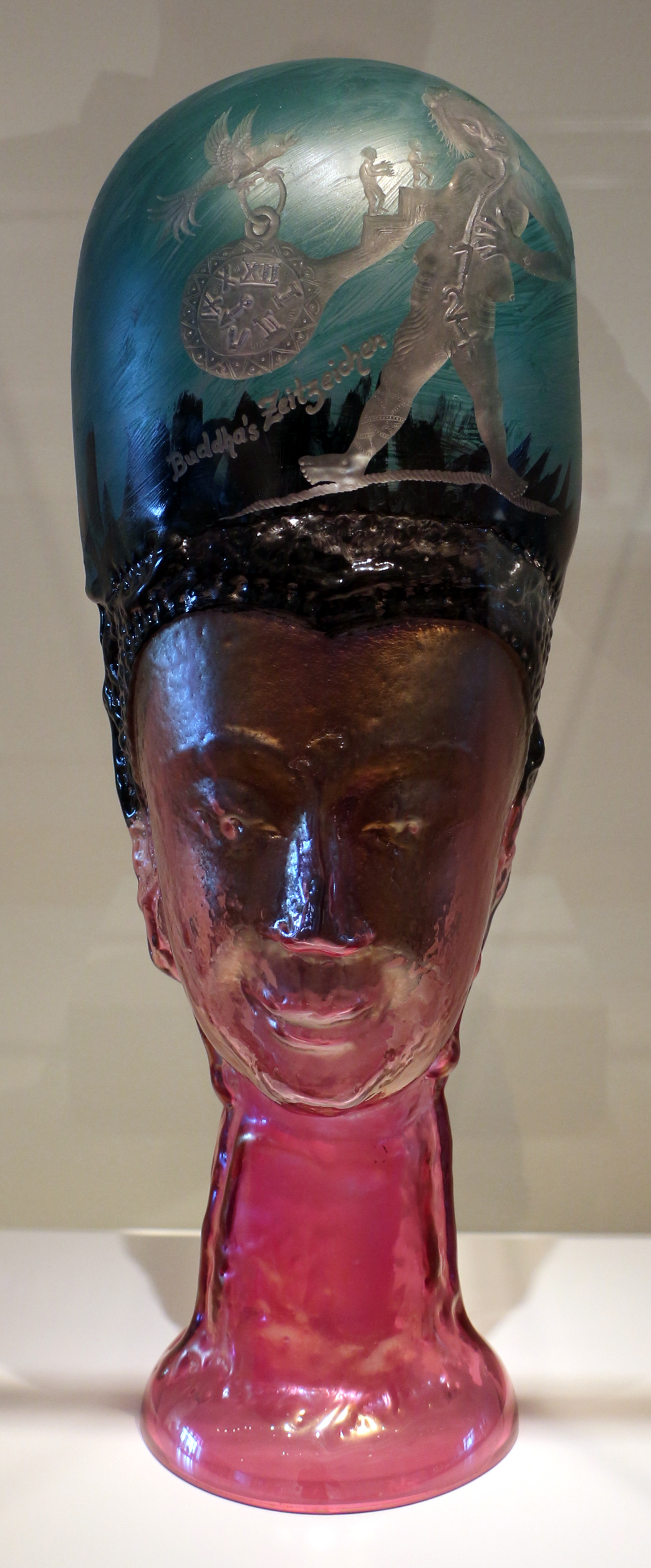
Buddha, 1988

Eisch was the eldest of six children of glass engraver Valentin Eisch and his wife, Therese Hirtreiter. The family lived in the town of Frauenau in Bavaria, where Valentin Eisch was employed as a master engraver at the glass factory of Isidor Gistl. The Eisch family was by no means well-off. His father supplemented his income by bringing work home to engrave on Sundays. The family also kept a cow, goats, and chickens to put milk, eggs and meat on the table.

With Hitler's rise to power the village of Frauenau, located near the border with Czechoslovakia, suffered under the Nazi regime. According to Erwin Eisch, his family, as well as most of the people in Frauenau, were Communists during the Weimar Republic and unsympathetic to National Socialism.

Eisch was drafted into the Wehrmacht in 1945 at age 18. He saw three months of service in Czechoslovakia and Denmark before he was taken prisoner by the British. After an internment of three and a half months, he returned to Frauenau where he learned glass engraving from his father. From 1946 to 1948 Eisch worked at this trade in the family's cutting and engraving shop while studying at the school of glassmaking in nearby Zwiesel. After taking his journeyman's examination in engraving in 1949 Eisch entered the Munich Academy of Fine Arts (Akademie der Bildenden Künste), where he studied glass design, sculpture and interior architecture, returning to Frauenau in 1952 to assist his parents and two brothers, Alfons and Erich, in founding a glassworks there. Within a few years the Eisch Glass Factory (Glashütte Eisch) employed a staff of some 200 people.

Eisch returned to the Munich Academy of Fine Arts in 1956, where he continued his studies in sculpture and painting. He, along with other young artists in the late 1950s, was aware of the Tachisme and Art Informel movements. Eisch, however, gravitated toward social criticism and anti-art establishment actions. In 1958 he was a founding member of the artist's group SPUR at the Munich Academy. Art scholar Susie J. Silbert identified SPUR as a Situationist group intent on revitalizing European culture by emphasizing artistic individualism. Quoting the group's 1958 manifesto, she wrote: "Art relies upon instinct, upon primary creative forces. To the detriment of all intellectual spectators, these free, wild forces always push toward the appearance of new, unexpected forms." Eisch left the group in 1959.

== RADAMA scandal, marriage ==
In 1960, with his future wife, Margarete "Gretel" Stadler and the artist Max Strack, Eisch formed the group RADAMA. The group became notorious for publishing a biography of a fictitious abstract painter, Bolus Krim, and holding a memorial exhibition of the "prematurely deceased" artist's work. The Malura Gallery in Munich mounted "In Memory of Bolus Krim" in 1961. According to Eisch, the exhibition was intended to reveal "the failure of the avante garde of the time." Bolus Krim's work, of course, was actually that of RADAMA members; Eisch showed a number of his glass pieces along with his paintings and sculpture. The ruse worked; art critics lavished praise on the exhibition and pronounced Krim a genius. Those duped by Bolus Krim were outraged when the hoax was revealed. Eisch left the Munich art scene soon after the scandal. In 1962 he and Gretel Stadler married and settled in Frauenau. There Eisch worked as the designer for the Eisch Glass Factory's commercial line of glassware, and Gretel learned to paint on glass. The couple held their first joint exhibition at Tritschler in Stuttgart in the spring of 1962. The glass objects shown by Eisch dated from 1952. He described the works as "full of all kinds of provocative themes and very unusual glass work, antifunctional, colorful, grotesque."

== Contact with Harvey Littleton ==
Harvey Littleton called his first meeting with Erwin Eisch a milestone in his development as a glass artist. In August 1962 Littleton was visiting Germany on a research grant when he noticed, in the showroom of the Rimpler Kristall glass factory in Zwiesel, a piece of glass that was unlike the other objects on display. Littleton was told that it was from the Eisch Glass Factory in the nearby town of Frauenau. Visiting the Eisch factory, Littleton met Erwin Eisch and marveled at his expressionistic free-blown glass objects. "Meeting Erwin confirmed my belief that glass could be a medium for direct expression by an individual," he wrote.

The two met again in 1964 at the first meeting of the World Congress of Craftsmen in New York City. At the conference, Littleton and his students set up a small furnace built by Dominick Labino and proceeded to blow glass. The demonstration impressed Eisch, who said, "The little furnace is the future." After the conference Eisch traveled to Madison, Wisconsin where he and Littleton co-taught a four-week summer class at the University of Wisconsin art department. As Eisch remembers it, his first trip to the U.S. was memorable. He wrote,"The Midwest was hot and I was shy, speechless and German in a strange new world. I didn't have an easy time of it. As [a] glassblower I was self-taught and clumsy; I confined myself to making handles. I could never get the first gather properly centered, but luckily we were all beginners."

After his return to Frauenau, Eisch built a small studio furnace in the basement of the factory where he melted his own batch from 1965 to 1975. During these years Eisch worked almost exclusively in glass. Working in a studio environment, rather than on the factory floor, allowed him to develop and refine his personal vision for glass as a sculptural medium. Notable works produced during this time included his environmental sculptures The Fountain of Youth and Narcissus.

In November 1967 Eisch returned to the University of Wisconsin as a visiting professor. For two months he worked in Littleton's studio, creating about 200 pieces of glass for exhibition in the United States. Watching Eisch develop his forms intrigued Littleton. Working with his assistant, Karl Paternoster, Eisch created "small, involved sculptural forms" that he fumed to unify the forms' surfaces, giving them the iridescence that one sees in Art Nouveau glass. Eisch later resorted to enameling the exteriors of his pieces to strengthen his forms.

During the time Eisch worked in Littleton's studio, his influence on his American colleague was strong. For weeks after Eisch's return to Germany, Littleton found himself creating works that were derivative of his friend's complex, intuitively-shaped forms. This, Littleton said, made him change the direction of his work to simple forms based on the column and the tube. The following summer, Littleton traveled to Frauenau to work in Eisch's studio, where he created about thirty sculptures for exhibition in Europe. Eisch and Littleton first exhibited together in 1969 in Munich and Cologne.

== Free-blown work of the 1960s and 1970s ==
Although many of Eisch's pieces of the 1960s and 1970s were rooted in functional forms such as the vase, the bottle, the pitcher and the stein, the usefulness of these vessels was never Eisch's goal. "The purely plastic form, with glass as medium, was a means of art free of an end," he wrote.

Eisch described his own glass forms of the sixties and seventies as "poetic or pictorial realism." He made clear that such a realism did not rely on observable fact, but on his inner reality; his fantasies. As important as his reliance on fantasy was to shaping his art, his unwillingness to compromise personal vision to appeal to the marketplace was just as vital. Therefore, his early pitchers, vases and teapots are so eccentrically shaped as to seem to be in the process of becoming, rather than being, commonplace objects. Unique and imperfect as Eisch's forms are, it is not much of a step for their creator to anthropomorphize them. Eisch said, "From a glowing inert mass must emerge things of beauty that are endowed with speech. A talent of innovating, creating animatedly, and the breath to blow are requisites. Without blowing nothing happens."

== Portrait heads ==
By 1972 Eisch was putting less time into free-blown glass sculpture. Instead, he devoted himself to the creation of sculptures from which ceramic molds for glass-blowing were made. His series of heads, including those of Littleton, Thomas Buechner, Picasso and the Buddha, and his "Blister-finger" series of works, were all mold-blown. This allowed Eisch to concentrate his efforts not only on sculpting but also on engraving and painting on glass. In using different cold-working techniques to create imagery on each piece in his series, along with distorting the hot glass sculpture as it came from the mold, Eisch made virtually identical mold-blown pieces into individual, unique statements.

== Painting and drawing ==
Beginning in the mid-1970s Eisch began to create more and more in the traditional art forms of painting on canvas and paper, drawing and printmaking. Eisch draws daily, often working in thematic series. While his imagery can be purely whimsical, the artist also uses it to make political statements. Above all, his guiding idea is the physical relationship of male and female, of human contact through touch with an emphasis on the hand.

Littleton wrote of Eisch's paintings and drawings that "Erwin...has said that the real landscape no longer exists in art, no more than the classic figure; and so he creates his own vision of the world of the spirit and new relationships of body forms."

== Vitreographs ==
Eisch first tried his hand at vitreography (printmaking from glass plates) during a visit to Littleton's studio in 1981. Littleton had begun to explore the possibilities of intaglio printmaking from glass matrices in Wisconsin in 1976; in 1981, after hiring a printer to assist him, Littleton began to invite artist colleagues to experiment in vitreography. Erwin Eisch was one of the first artists invited to engage in printmaking at Littleton Studios. Eisch brought his background in glass engraving to bear on the vitreograph plate. He abraded and cut into the glass surface, which was then inked and printed onto paper under pressure in an etching press. He produced six intaglio prints in four days during that visit. Over the following 26 years Littleton Studios published 64 prints by Eisch, including a ten-print portfolio titled "Kristallnacht: Night of Crystal Death." According to Eisch, he created the portfolio as a means "to relieve some of the clinging shame that weighs down upon us Germans, and to bring courage to all those who oppose hate and violence and the destruction of the environment, today and forever." Using a palette of primarily red and black ink, Eisch aimed to show in the artworks "the brutality and stupidity" of the November 1938 pogrom in Nazi Germany that foreshadowed the Holocaust.

== Teacher and lecturer ==
In addition to teaching in the glass program at the University of Wisconsin in 1964 and 1968, Eisch was a guest instructor at San Jose State University (1968), Haystack Mountain School of Crafts in Maine (1972), Foley College of Art, Stourbridge, England (1974), and Alfred University in New York (1976). In addition, he taught various subjects, including drawing, glass painting, sandblasting, and engraving at Pilchuck Glass School in 1981, 1983 and 1984. Eisch lectured at the XIII International Congress on Glass in London, England (1968), the World Crafts Conference in Dublin, Ireland (1970), the World Crafts Conference in Kyoto, Japan (1978), the Glass Art Society Conferences in New York City (1982) and in Corning, New York (1979, 1991). He was also an organizer of the First and Second International Glass Symposia in Frauenau, Germany in 1982 and 1985.

In 1988 Eisch founded the summer school Bild-Werk Frauenau. In 2008 Bild-Werk Frauenau offered four summer sessions and 36 courses in subjects ranging from painting and drawing, to cutting and engraving glass, to singing. In addition to Eisch and his wife Gretel, artists teaching at Bildwerk Frauenau included Eisch's friend, the painter (and founding director of the Corning Museum of Glass) Tom Buechner, glass artist Jiří Harcuba, puppet maker Peter Hermann), glass artist and vitreographer Ursula Merker, multi-media artist Gerhard Ribka, glass artist Therman Statom, multi-media artist Stephen P. Day, and glass caster Angela Thwaites.

== Initiator and co-founder of the Frauenau Glass Museum ==
Together with Mayor Alfons Hannes, Erwin Eisch was a co-founder of the Frauenau Glass museum, which opened in 1975 in the presence of international glass artists. It is thanks to him that in 1982 art historian Wolfgang Kermer's important studio glass collection, parts of which had already been shown in cooperation with Erwin Eisch in 1975 and 1976/77, was donated to the museum, where it still forms the basis of the modern department today. The Wolfgang Kermer collection catalog of the Frauenau Museum includes 46 examples of Erwin Eisch's work from the period 1967 to 1976.

== Public collections ==
Eisch's work has been collected by the Chazen Museum of Art of the University of Wisconsin-Madison, the Florida Gulf Coast University Galleries, Glasmuseet Ebeltoft in Denmark, Glasmuseum Lobmeyr in Vienna, Kunstgewerbemuseum Berlin, Frauenau Glass Museum, Kunstsammlungen der Veste Coburg, Corning Museum of Glass, Kunstmuseum Düsseldorf, Metropolitan Museum of Art in New York City, Musée des Arts Décoratifs, Paris, Museum Bellerive in Zürich, Museum Boijmans van Beuningen in Rotterdam; Musée national des beaux-arts du Québec, Nagahama City Museum in Japan, National Museum of Modern Art, Kyoto, Toledo Museum of Art, and the National Museum of American History, Smithsonian Institution.

== Personal life and death ==
Erwin and Gretel Eisch had five children. Erwin Eisch died in Zwiesel on 25 January 2022, at the age of 94.
