= Jörg F. Zimmermann =

German glass artist and professor

Jörg F. Zimmermann (born 1940 in Uhingen, Germany), is a German glass artist. Zimmermann was studying glass design at the Fachhochschule für Gestaltung in Schwäbisch Gmünd. Zimmermann has been working since 1968 as self-employed Industrial-Designer. He has been teaching since 1976 at the State Academy of Fine Arts Stuttgart glass arts.

== Work ==
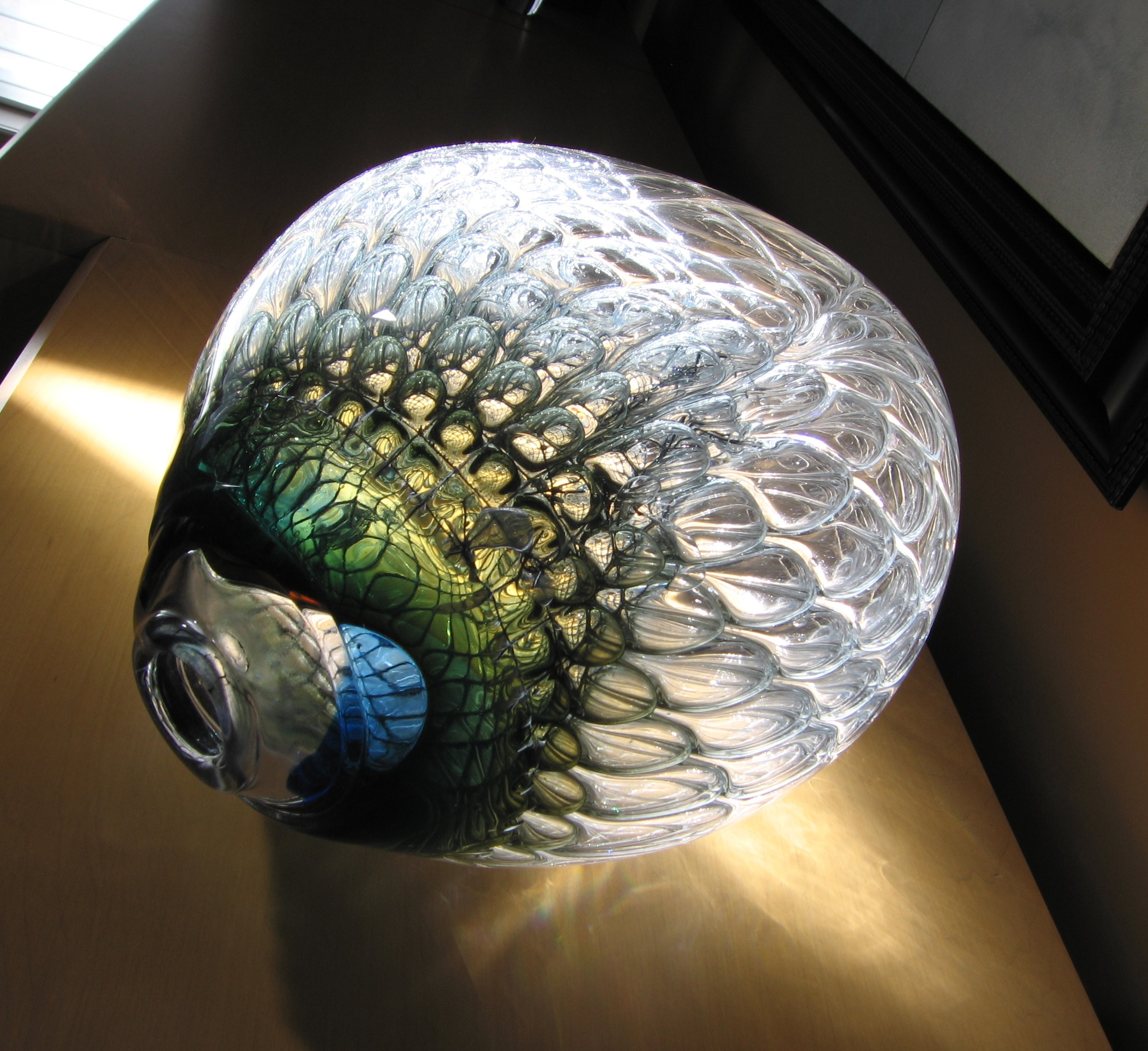
Honeycomb Sculpture, 2000.

Zimmermann's development are artistic glass objects, which has the structures of nature as paradigm. These natural structures are the basic idea in Zimmermann's work. His structures could be found in corals, fruits, leaves or ice. Zimmermann lets the glass grow. He has developed his so-called "Honeycomb objects". Zimmermann has received several awards, and his work is shown in many glass museums all over the world.
