= State Academy of Fine Arts Stuttgart =

University in Stuttgart, Germany

- Staatliche Akademie der Bildenden Künste Stuttgart
- Other names: ABK Stuttgart
- Former names: Royal Academy of Fine Arts, Stuttgart
- Type: public
- Established: 1761
- Rector: Eva-Maria Seng
- Students: 900
- Location: Stuttgart, Germany; 48.8002°N 9.1743°E
- Website: abk-stuttgart.de

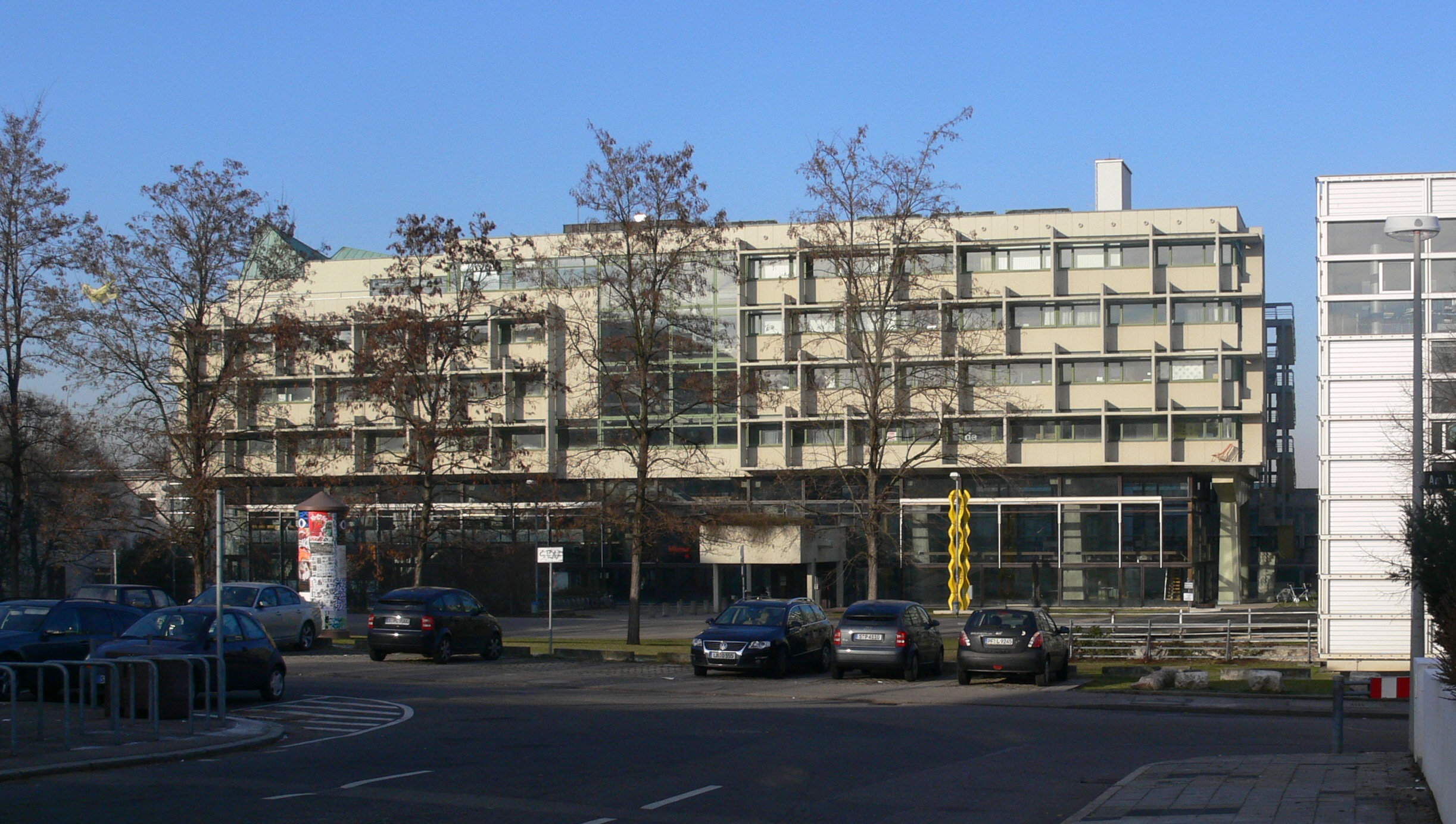
Campus building Neubau 1 (Neubau 2 cropped right), 2007

The State Academy of Fine Arts Stuttgart (German: Staatliche Akademie der bildenden Künste Stuttgart, or ABK Stuttgart) is a public fine art university in Stuttgart, Germany. It was founded in 1761 and has been located on the Weissenhof since 1946. Its campus consists of three buildings: the Altbau, Neubau 1 or "Architects' Building", and Neubau 2.

== History ==
The Academy is a fine art university in the federal state of Baden-Württemberg which formed in 1941 through the merging of the former Academy of Fine Arts (Württembergische Akademie der bildenden Künste) with the former School of Applied Arts (Württembergische Staatliche Kunstgewerbeschule) to make the Staatliche Akademie der bildenden Künste Stuttgart. This was reconstituted under the same name in 1946 by Theodor Heuss. Under the rectorate of Wolfgang Kermer, on 22 February 1975, the ″Gesetz über die Kunsthochschulen im Lande Baden-Württemberg (Kunsthochschulgesetz)″ passed by the Landtag of Baden-Württemberg came into force. For the first time in the history of the Stuttgart State Academy of Art and Design, this regulated the status and guaranteed the equality of rank with universities. ″The Stuttgart Academy", said Rector Wolfgang Kermer on the occasion of the ″State Art University Weeks 1981″ (Landeskunsthochschulwochen 1981) in Baden-Baden, ″sees its task and responsibility as a ′universitas artium′, whose - certainly high - standards must be to be part of the constantly changing art reality and at the same time to contribute to these changes.″

On 25 June 1761, Charles Eugene, Duke of Württemberg, established an Académie des Artsin his New Palace in the center of Stuttgart, ″where youth can develop as young plants in a nursery″.

This institution went into decline after a second art educational institution founded by Eugene, the Karlsschule, gained in importance so that the Académie des Arts existed only by name. The Karlsschule was an elite school with military education methods, situated behind the New Palace in Stuttgart. In 1781 the Karlsschule was raised by Emperor Joseph II to university status under the name Karls Hohe Schule. One of the unique features was the print workshop, founded in 1776 under the copper engraver Johann Gotthard von Müller.

After the death of Eugene in 1793, the Hohe Karlsschule was disbanded in 1794 by his brother and successor Louis Eugene, Duke of Württemberg.

35 years later, in 1829, King William I of Württemberg founded an art school in Stuttgart, initially in conjunction with other educational institutions (Vereinigte Kunst-, Real- und Gewerbe-Schule). The ″Royal art school″ (Königliche Kunstschule) gradually developed as a training center, which in 1901 under the direction of Leopold Graf von Kalckreuth received the title ″Royal academy of fine arts″ (Königliche Akademie der bildenden Künste, after 1918 Württembergische Akademie der bildenden Künste).

Under the Nazi regime, in 1941, the academy was linked with the School of Applied Arts (Württembergische Staatliche Kunstgewerbeschule, founded in Stuttgart in 1869) under the name Staatliche Akademie der Bildenden Künste Stuttgart (Stuttgart State Academy of Art and Design), with each institution retaining its previous location. After World War II, the institution retained this name when it was reconstituted in 1946 by Theodor Heuss, the Minister of Education and Cultural Affairs in the state of Württemberg-Baden. Since the buildings in downtown Stuttgart (Urbanstraße 37/39) had been destroyed in air raids in 1943 and 1944, the academy moved into the building of the former School of Applied Arts, built on the Weißenhof in 1913 under the direction of Bernhard Pankok. By 1906, Pankok had suggested the connexion of the Royal Academy of Fine Arts and the Royal School of Applied Arts and its workshops (Lehr- und Versuchswerkstätte, founded in 1901). He had planned an art school uniting all artistic disciplines on the Weißenhof area, but had found no resonance in Stuttgart. It was not until the winter of 1956/57 that the academy was extended for the first time on the Weißenhof area with the move into a newly built ″Sculptor′s building″ (″Bildhauerbau″).

In 1950 you could study painting, glass painting, sculpture, free and applied graphics, interior and furniture design (″Innenarchitektur und Möbelbau"), textiles, ceramics, metal and art teaching, and professors included Trude Barth, Otto Baum, Willi Baumeister, Walter Brudi, Rudolf Daudert, Hans Fegers, Eugen Funk, Gerhard Gollwitzer, Peter Otto Heim, Manfred Henninger, Karl Hils, Eberhard Krauß, Hans Meid, Hugo Peters, Karl Rössing, Harmi Ruland, Hermann Sohn, Karl Hans Walter, Hans Warnecke, Kurt Wehlte, Hans Wentzel, Karl Wiehl and Rudolf Yelin.

After the Protests of 1968 at the Academy, the university was fundamentally reformed under the rectorate of art historian Wolfgang Kermer in 1975 and 1978, with new university laws for the art and music colleges of Baden-Württemberg. The legal status was clarified and guaranteed equality of rank with universities. The academy decided on a new structure, dissolved the old departments, and formed various specialist groups and study programs. In the 1970s diplomas for design courses were introduced, and the promotion of talented students through state-funded exhibitions and publications was institutionalized. During these years of academy reform, the Rector and Senate received support from the Association of Friends of the Academy, as Wolfgang Kermer emphasized in a paper published in 2024. Since 1975, the Academy of Art has had its own art collection, founded by Kermer and comprising the works of current and former teachers as well as alumni. This era created the foundation on which the Academy stands today.

Over more than 250 years of history, many prominent artists and teachers have studied or taught at the Academy. Selected rectors, faculty and alumni are listed in the next sections.

== List of rectors ==
List of rectors at ABK Stuttgart (since 1946):

- 1946–1953, Hermann Brachert, sculptor
- 1953–1955, Karl Rössing, graphic artist
- 1955–1957, Manfred Henninger, painter
- 1957–1959, Rudolf Yelin (The Younger), glass painter
- 1959–1969, Walter Brudi, book artist and typographer
- 1969–1971, Herbert Hirche, architect, furniture and product designer
- 1971–1984, Wolfgang Kermer, art historian
- 1984–1987, Manfred Kröplien, graphic designer
- 1987–1991, Paul Uwe Dreyer, painter
- 1991–1994, Wolfgang Henning, architect
- 1994–1998, Klaus Lehmann, product designer
- 1998–2004, Paul Uwe Dreyer, painter
- 2004–2010, Ludger Hünnekens, archaeologist and cultural manager
- 2010–2016, Petra von Olschowski, art historian and journalist
- 2017–2022, Barbara Bader, art scientist and teacher

== Notable faculty ==
- Heinrich Altherr
- Heba Y. Amin
- Fritz Auer
- Willi Baumeister
- Johann Wilhelm Beyer
- David Chipperfield
- Johann Heinrich von Dannecker
- Christophe de la Fontaine
- Sam Durant
- Alexander Eckener
- Heinz Edelmann
- Marianne Eigenheer
- Reinhard Heinrich Ferdinand Fischer
- Heinrich Funk
- Rainer Ganahl
- Carlos Grethe
- Jakob Grünenwald
- Nicolas Guibal
- Adolf Friedrich Harper
- Robert von Haug
- Philipp Friedrich von Hetsch
- Herbert Hirche
- Adolf Hölzel
- Rudolf Hoflehner
- Alfred Hrdlicka
- Christian Jankowski
- Joan Jonas
- Leopold Graf von Kalckreuth
- Albert Kappis
- Friedrich von Keller
- Wolfgang Kermer
- Anton Kolig
- Joseph Kosuth
- Aylin Langreuter
- Christian Landenberger
- Christian Friedrich von Leins
- Sándor Liezen-Mayer
- Alisa Margolis
- Erich Mönch
- Johann Gotthard von Müller
- Bernhard von Neher
- Hannes Neuner
- Chris Newman
- Bernhard Pankok
- Robert Pötzelberger
- Heinrich von Rustige
- Richard Sapper
- Philipp Jakob Scheffauer
- Hans Erich Slany
- K.R.H. Sonderborg
- Giuseppe Spagnulo
- Hans Spiegel
- Gottlob Friedrich Steinkopf
- Patrick Thomas
- Nikolaus Friedrich von Thouret
- Niklaus Troxler
- Micha Ullman
- Jörg F Zimmermann

== Notable alumni ==
- Max Ackermann
- Leonor Antunes
- Ellen Auerbach
- Karl Bauer
- Philipp Bauknecht
- Willi Baumeister
- Alf Bayrle
- F. W. Bernstein
- Bernhard Buttersack
- Eric Carle
- Karl Caspar
- Maria Caspar-Filser
- Gustav Paul Closs
- Johann Heinrich von Dannecker
- Carl Ebert (painter)
- Carl Eytel
- Christophe de la Fontaine
- Stefan Diez
- Fritz Faiss
- Reinhard Heinrich Ferdinand Fischer
- Adolf Fleischmann
- Heinrich Füger
- Peter Gamper
- Jakob Gauermann
- Robert Gernhardt
- Oskar Glöckler
- Camille Graeser
- HAP Grieshaber
- Jakob Grünenwald
- Hermann Haller
- Armin Hansen
- Ferdinand Hartmann
- Sandra Hastenteufel
- Philipp Friedrich von Hetsch
- Ludwig Hirschfeld Mack
- Karl Hofer
- Renate Hoffleit
- Johannes Itten
- Georg Jauss
- Erich Kahn
- Friedrich von Keller
- Paul Wilhelm Keller-Reutlingen
- Ida Kerkovius
- Wolfgang Kermer
- Fyodor Khitruk
- Byung Chul Kim
- Günther C. Kirchberger
- Joseph Anton Koch
- Susan Kozma-Orlay
- Frans Krajcberg
- Susanne Kriemann
- Angela Laich
- Christian Landenberger
- Peter Lenk
- Johann Friedrich Leybold
- Käthe Loewenthal
- James McGarrell
- Paul Maar
- Michel Majerus
- Otto Meyer-Amden
- Erich Mönch
- Louis Moilliet
- Johann Gotthard von Müller
- Heinrich Nauen
- Rolf Nesch
- Vera Neubauer
- Christoph Niemann
- August Friedrich Oelenhainz
- Carl Offterdinger
- Werner Pawlok
- Alfred Heinrich Pellegrini
- Jan-Hendrik Pelz
- Georg Karl Pfahler
- Hermann Pleuer
- Charlotte Posenenske
- Lilo Ramdohr
- Aiga Rasch
- Lilo Rasch-Naegele
- Günther Raupp
- Else Raydt
- Otto Reiniger
- Regina Relang
- Anselm Reyle
- Luisa Richter
- Karin Sander
- Philipp Jakob Scheffauer
- Gottlieb Schick
- Adolf Schill
- Rudolf Schlichter
- Oskar Schlemmer
- Ilse Schüle
- Hermann Stenner
- Grete Stern
- Nikolaus Friedrich von Thouret
- Georg Trump
- Tesfaye Urgessa
- Eberhard Georg Friedrich von Wächter
- Emil Rudolf Weiß
- Willy Wiedmann
- Ludwig Wilding
- Peter Zimmermann
- Heinrich von Zügel
- Georg Friedrich Zundel
- Nijolė Šivickas

== Honorary members and honorary senators of the Academy ==
=== Honorary Members of the Académie des Arts ===
- Anna Dorothea Therbusch (1762)

=== Honorary Members of the Stuttgart State Academy of Art an Design (appointment period 1942–1999) ===
- Bernhard Pankok (1942)
- Ida Kerkovius (1962)
- Rolf Nesch (1962)
- Wilhelm Wagenfeld (1962)
- Walter Gropius (1968)
- Karl Schmidt-Rottluff (1964)
- Erich Mönch (1975)
- Hannes Neuner (1976)
- Camille Graeser (1977)
- Herbert Hirche (1977)
- Oswald Oberhuber (1982)

=== Honorary Senators (appointment period 2004 to today) ===
- Wolfgang Kermer (2004)
- Oswald Oberhuber (2004)
- Gerd Hatje (2006)

== "Against forgetting" ==
=== Alumni of the Stuttgart art schools, who died in the Holocaust ===
- Carry van Biema (1881–1942)
- Alice Haarburger (1891–1942)
- Maria Lemmé (1880–1943)
- Käthe Loewenthal (1878–1942)
- Paula Straus (1894–1943)
- Marianne Weil (1909–1942)

=== Artists who participated in the Stuttgart Jewish art exhibitions in 1935 and/or 1937, presumably studied at the Stuttgart art schools and whose fate is unknown ===
- Ly Bernheimer
- Hilde Brandt
- Trude Munk
- Else Samuel

=== Alumni from the Stuttgart art schools who survived the Holocaust ===
- Ellen Auerbach (1906–2004)
- Erwin Broner (1898–1971)
- Dina Cymbalist (1907–1989)
- Paul Elsas (1896–1981)
- Hermann Fechenbach (1897–1986)
- Margarethe Garthe (1891–1976); art studies in Stuttgart not cleared
- Liselotte Grschebina (1908–1994)
- Boris Grünwald (1933–2014)
- Elli Heimann (1891–1966); art studies in Stutttgart not cleared
- Lily Hildebrandt (1887–1974)
- Erich Kahn (1904–1980)
- Hermann Kahn (Aharon Kahana) (1905–1967)
- Ignaz Kaufmann (1885–1975)
- Fyodor Khitruk (1917–2012)
- Susan Kozma-Orlay (1913–2008); Hungarian–Australian designer
- Frans Krajcberg (1921–2017)
- Klara Neuburger (1882–1945)
- Charlotte Posenenske (1930–1985)
- Imre Reiner (1900–1987)
- Grete Stern (1904–1999)
