= Gustav Closs =

Gustav Closs may refer to:

- Gustav Paul Closs (1840–1870), German landscape painter
- Gustav Adolf Closs (1864–1938), German artist
