= Philipp Bauknecht =

German painter

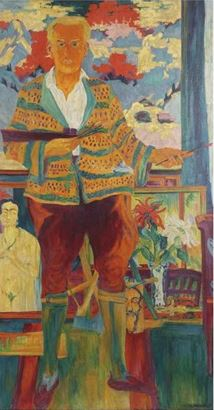
- Born: Barcelona, Kingdom of Spain
- Died: 26 February 1933 (aged 48); Davos, Switzerland
- Known for: Painting
- Movement: Expressionism

Philipp Bauknecht (1884, Barcelona - 26 February 1933, Davos) was a German Expressionist painter and graphic artist. Most of his works are landscapes and still-lifes.

== Biography ==
He was born in Barcelona, where his father was working as a watchmaker and goldsmith. In 1893, his family returned to their hometown of Schramberg. He later completed an apprenticeship at the carpentry school in Nürnberg, then attended the State Academy of Fine Arts Stuttgart where he studied with Bernhard Pankok. Upon graduating, he joined the school's staff.

Around 1910, he was diagnosed with tuberculosis and moved to Davos, a spa town in Switzerland, where he became friends with the writers Klabund and Erwin Poeschel. The surroundings of the Swiss Alps and his illness inspired him to create works dealing with mountains, landscapes, villages, ice skating, hiking, rural life, illness and death.

Even though his health improved, he refused to return to Germany, as he was opposed to the war. He apparently lived very poorly, in a log cabin, and the proceeds from his first exhibition were seized to pay off debts. During this time, he became severely misanthropic; satirizing the people of Davos and the guests who came there to visit the spa. In 1917, one of those guests was the famous artist, Ernst Ludwig Kirchner. At first, they were friends, but slowly became enemies. Bauknecht accused him of being unable to paint unless he was drunk and rejected the idea that Kirchner had influenced him.

After 1920, until his death, he exhibited his paintings and woodcuts widely throughout Switzerland and Germany. In 1925, he married the wealthy Ada van Blommestein, from the Netherlands, and travelled with her there. They had one son. Although he was now financially secure, his health began to deteriorate, so he returned to Davos and died there in 1933, while having an operation for gastric cancer. Ada took his remaining works to Baarn, in the Netherlands, and hid them from the Nazis. In Germany, his paintings were declared "degenerate art" and some were displayed at the Degenerate Art Exhibition in Munich in 1937. Most of his work there was eventually destroyed or lost. It wasn't until 1960 that his works were rediscovered and reevaluated.

== Selected paintings ==
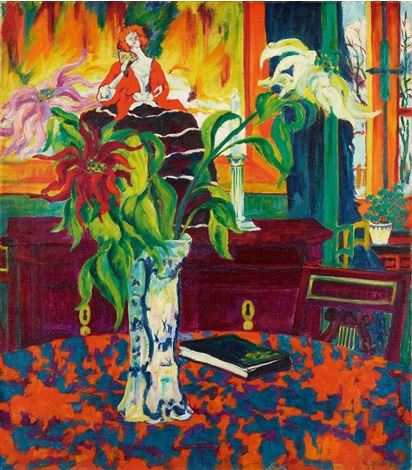
Floral Still-life with Book

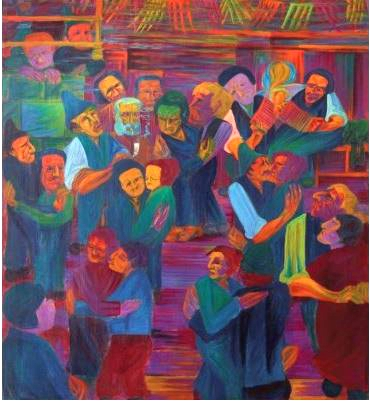
Alpine Fair, Dance

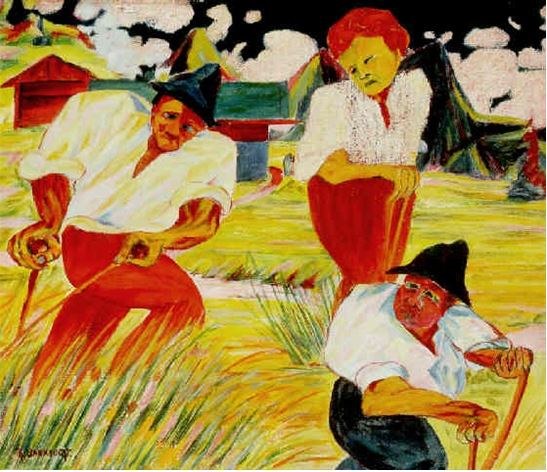
Farmers in the Field

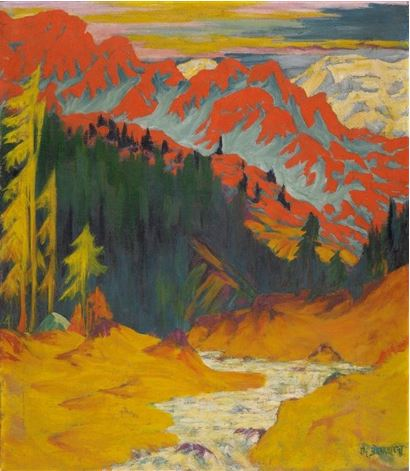
Autumn in the Mountains
