= Peter Zimmermann =

German painter and object artist

Peter Zimmermann (born 1956 in Freiburg im Breisgau) is a German painter, object artist and former university professor.

== Life ==
Peter Zimmermann studied at the State Academy of Fine Arts Stuttgart from 1978 to 1983 and has since participated in numerous solo and group exhibitions in galleries and museums in Germany and abroad. He works as a painter and object artist. From 2002 to 2007, he was a professor at the Academy of Media Arts Cologne.

== Work ==
Zimmermann's works are highly diverse. At the end of the 1980s, he created "Book Cover Paintings", in which he transferred the titles of atlases, art books, travel guides and dictionaries onto canvas using epoxy resin. In his cardboard objects, he worked with spatial distortions of text, thereby questioning the relationship between text and image. The colourful motifs of his epoxy resin paintings are based on digital source material, such as photographs, film stills or diagrams, which he distorts using graphical algorithms and transfers onto canvas in numerous transparent layers of epoxy resin. Since 1993, Zimmermann has regarded the computer as a conceptual medium through which he explores the manipulability of digital images and their changing relationship to reality and representation. Since 2014, he has increasingly realised this conceptual approach through the medium of oil painting.

Central to his work are both the relationship between the original and its representation and an engagement with the concept of the surface.

Zimmermann's works are held in numerous private and public collections, including the Bundeskunstsammlung, the Centre Pompidou in Paris and the Museum of Modern Art in New York. The artist lives and works in Cologne.

== Exhibitions ==
=== Solo exhibitions (selection) ===
- 2023: Nunu Fine Art, New York
  - Stickers, Dirimart, Istanbul
  - Vis-à-Vis, Kienbaum, Cologne
- 2022: Stickerwand, Galerie Nagel Draxler, Cologne
- 2021: layer on layer, Nosbaum Reding, Luxembourg
  - Meta Pictures, Nunu Fine Art, Taipei
  - Halle 9 / Techne Sphere, Leipzig
- 2020: sway, Galerie Nagel Draxler, Berlin
- 2019: abstractness, Leopold Hoesch Museum, Düren
  - paint it, Galerie Stadt Sindelfingen, Sindelfingen
- 2018: One, two, four, Samuelis Baumgarte Galerie, Bielefeld
  - art berlin 2018, One-Person-Show, Samuelis Baumgarte Galerie
- 2016: Museum für Neue Kunst, Freiburg
  - Playlist, Samuelis Baumgarte Galerie, Bielefeld
  - Museum gegenstandsfreier Kunst, Otterndorf
- 2015: CMYK, Dirimart, Istanbul
  - Nunu Fine Arts, Taipei
- 2014: sur le motif, Galerie Perrotin, Paris
- 2013: Undertones, Wasserman Projects, Detroit
  - Johyun Gallery, Busan, Korea
  - crystal & fruits, Galerie Michael Janssen, Singapore
- 2012: Galeria Filomena Soares, Lisbon
  - drop, Galerie Perrotin, Hong Kong
- 2011: Panorama, Kunstforum and Kunstverein Schwäbisch Hall
  - Galerie MaxWeberSixFriedrich, Munich
- 2009: Museum Moderner Kunst Kärnten, Klagenfurt
  - Galerie Six Friedrich Lisa Ungar, Munich
- 2008: currents, Columbus Museum of Art, Columbus, Ohio
- 2007/2008: wheel, Kunsthalle Nürnberg
- 2006: Capas de gelatina / Layers of jelly, Centro de Arte Contemporáneo, Málaga
- 2004: Before After, Delaware Center of Contemporary Art, Delaware
- 2003: x-pollination, with Claus Carstensen, Esbjerg Kunstmuseum, Denmark
- 2002: Zipp, Kasseler Kunstverein, Kassel
- 2001: Flow, Kunstverein Heilbronn
  - Kunsthalle Erfurt, Erfurt
- 2000: Galerie SixFriedrichLisaUngar, Munich
- 1998: Eigentlich könnte alles auch anders sein, Kölnischer Kunstverein, Cologne
  - Kisten & Plakate, Städtische Galerie Donaueschingen
- 1997: Otto-Dix-Haus, Gera
- 1996: Remixes, Icebox, Athens
  - Öffentlich / Privat (with Thomas Locher), Kunstraum der Universität Lüneburg and Künstlerhaus Stuttgart
- 1995: Galerie Six Friedrich, Munich
- 1992: Kunstverein Münster

=== Group exhibitions (selection) ===
- 2023: Eruption, Anima Gallery, Doha
  - Bis die Bude brummt, Museum für Neue Kunst, Freiburg
- 2022: What I like!, Galerie Stadt Sindelfingen
  - Bibliomania – Das Buch in der Kunst, Kunstmuseum Villa Zanders, Bergisch Gladbach
  - Grenzenlos. Einblicke in eine unbekannte Privatsammlung, Kunsthaus Zofingen
- 2020: Vestige and Eternity, Nunu Fine Art, Taipei
- 2019: KUNST#quer#Kopf, Hochschule für Bildende Künste Braunschweig
  - A misura d’uomo – Tribute to Leonardo, Luca Tommasi Arte Contemporanea, Milan
- 2018: Color-aid, Wasserman Projects, Detroit
- 2017: Resonanzen. 40 Jahre Kunststiftung Baden-Württemberg, ZKM, Karlsruhe
- 2016: Gaa Gallery, Provincetown
- 2013: To Open Eyes – Kunst und Textil vom Bauhaus bis heute, Kunsthalle Bielefeld
  - Happy Birthday, Galerie Perrotin / 25 Years, Tripostal, Lille
- 2012: The slide show, FRAC Auvergne, Clermont-Ferrand
- 2011: Farbe im Fluss, Weserburg Museum of Modern Art, Bremen
  - Hirschfaktor "Die Kunst des Zitierens", ZKM, Karlsruhe
- 2009: Reloaded, Kunstmuseum Bonn
  - Extended, ZKM, Karlsruhe
- 2008: There is Desire left (Knock, knock), works from the Mondstudio collection, Museum Wiesbaden
  - Vertrautes Terrain. Aktuelle Kunst in & über Deutschland – collector's choice, ZKM, Museum für Neue Kunst, Karlsruhe
- 2007: Moscow Biennale
- 2006: Wilhelm-Hack-Museum, Ludwigshafen
- 2005: Museum der Moderne Salzburg, Rupertinum
- 2004: Thomas Locher, Wilhelm Mundt, Peter Zimmermann, Galerie Six Friedrich Lisa Ungar, Munich
- 2003: Württembergischer Kunstverein Stuttgart
  - Morsbroich Museum, Leverkusen
- 2002: Schirn Kunsthalle Frankfurt
  - Deichtorhallen, Hamburg

== Bibliography ==
=== Books and catalogues ===
- Jochen and Laura Kienbaum: Peter Zimmermann, swipe, Kienbaum Artists' Book, Snoeck, 2023. ISBN 978-3-86442-410-6
- Peter Zimmermann: eins zu eins, Salon Verlag, Cologne, 2021. ISBN 978-3-89770-489-3
- Leopold-Hoesch-Museum, Düren: Peter Zimmermann, abstractness, Edition Cantz, Düren, 2020. ISBN 978-3-947563-65-4
- Galerie Stadt Sindelfingen: Peter Zimmermann, paint it, Sindelfingen, 2019. ISBN 978-3-928222-56-3
- Samuelis Baumgarte Galerie: Peter Zimmermann, one two four, Bielefeld, 2018. ISBN 978-3-9818840-5-0
- Museum gegenstandsfreier Kunst, Otterndorf: Peter Zimmermann, Pool, Otterndorf, 2017. ISBN 978-3-903153-30-1
- Museum für Neue Kunst Freiburg: Peter Zimmermann – Schule von Freiburg. (German and English), SNOECK, Freiburg, 2016. ISBN 978-3-86442-175-4
- Galerie Perrotin: Peter Zimmermann. (English and Chinese), Damiani editore, Paris, 2013. ISBN 978-88-6208-307-2
- Andrea Madesta: Peter Zimmermann – Works since 1987 (German, English and French), SNOECK, Cologne, 2009. ISBN 978-3-940953-03-2
- Ellen Seifermann (ed.): Peter Zimmermann. wheel. (German and English). Verlag für moderne Kunst, Nuremberg, 2007. ISBN 978-3-939738-98-5
- Hubertus Butin: Peter Zimmermann. Painting. Hatje Cantz, Ostfildern, 2007. ISBN 978-3-7757-1959-9
- Peter Zimmermann: Epoxiology. (German, English and French). König, Cologne, 2006. ISBN 978-3-86560-179-7
- Stephan Berg: Peter Zimmermann. capas de gelatina. (English and Spanish). Centro de Arte, Málaga, 2006. ISBN 84-96159-40-X
- Jens Schröter: Peter Zimmermann. Kunsthalle Erfurt, Erfurt, 2001
- Tom Holert: Peter Zimmermann. Flow. König, Cologne, 2001. ISBN 3-88375-498-6
- Peter Zimmermann: Skandal: Kunst. Springer, Vienna and New York, 2000. ISBN 3-211-83418-4
- Peter Zimmermann: Eigentlich könnte alles auch anders sein. König, Cologne, 1998. ISBN 3-88375-323-8

=== Secondary literature ===
- Harald Uhr: "Painting vs. Plasmaflachbildschirm – Ein Portrait von Harald Uhr", Artblog Cologne, 28 July 2015
- Margrit Brehm: The Reflection of Surfaces. Die Reflexion der Oberflächen. La réflexion des surfaces. In: Peter Zimmermann. Epoxiology. Walther König, Cologne, 2007. ISBN 3-86560-179-0
- Margit Zuckriegl: Peter Zimmermann. Die Gedanken der Bilder. The thoughts of pictures. In: Vom Bild zum Bild. Metamorphose. Museum der Moderne Salzburg, Rupertinum, Salzburg, 2005, pp. 42–47
- Ralf Christofori: Kopfsprung in den Signalfluß. In: Frankfurter Allgemeine Zeitung, 30 August 2001
- Hans-Jürgen August: Erregung kollektiven Lustgefühls. In: Wiener Zeitung, 1 December 2001
- Astrid Wege: Peter Zimmermann. In: Artis, December 1996
- Franz Kotteder: Heimwerkers Alptraum. In: Süddeutsche Zeitung, 7 March 1996
- Jürgen Hohmeyer (16 January 1995), "Aufatmen beim Verhör", Der Spiegel, no. 3, pp. 152–154
