= Carl Offterdinger =

German painter (1829–1889)

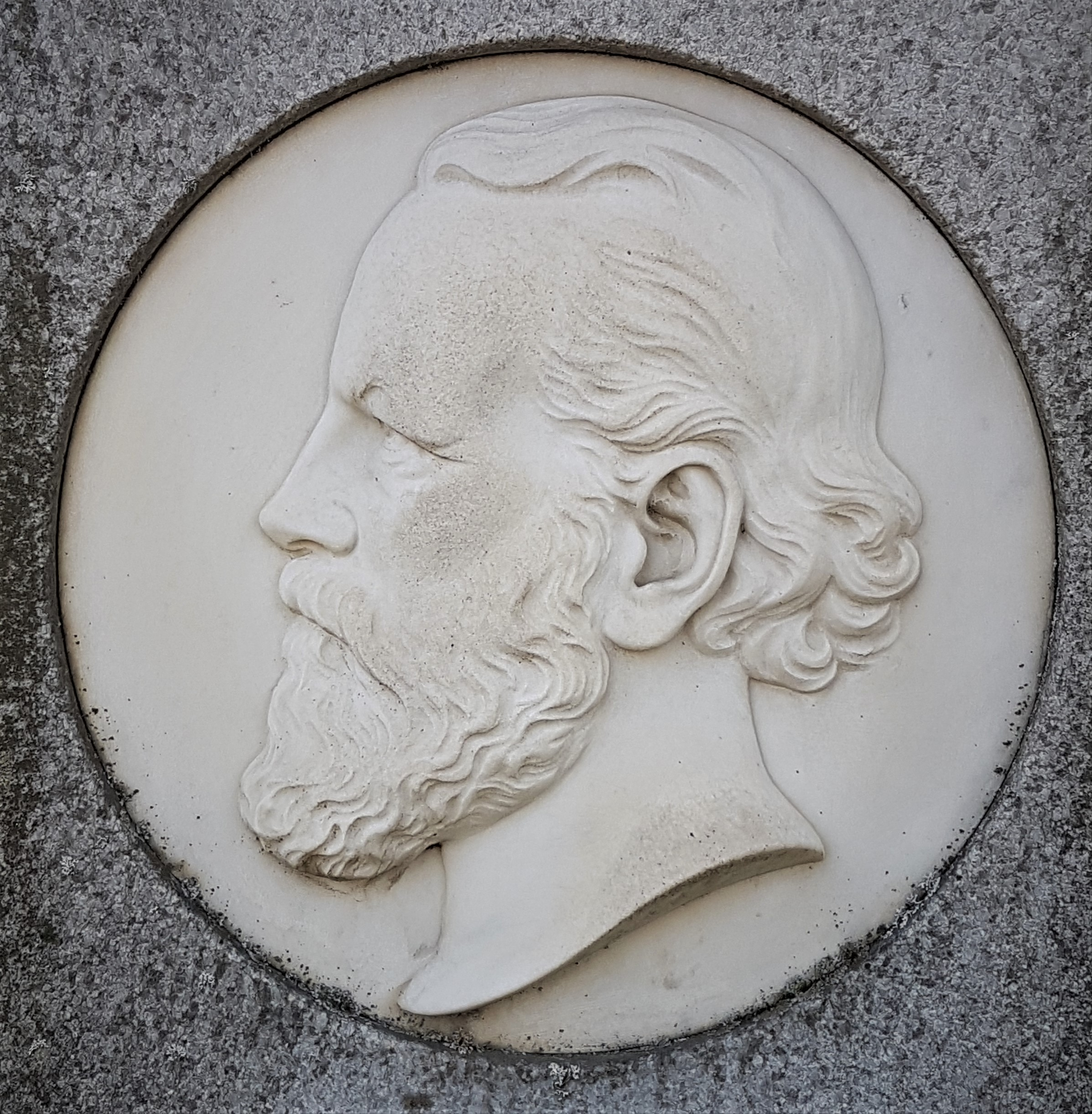
Medallion portrait of Offterdinger

Carl Offterdinger (January 8, 1829, in Stuttgart – January 12, 1889, in Stuttgart) was a German figure and genre painter and illustrator.

== Book illustrations ==
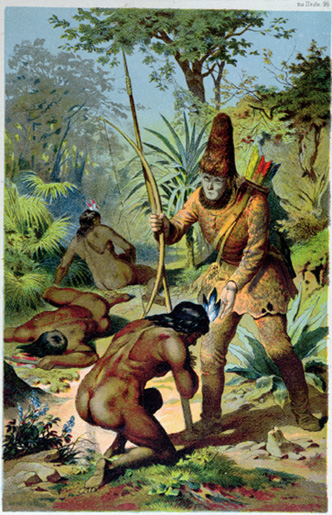
"Robinson Crusoe and Man Friday" (ca. 1880)

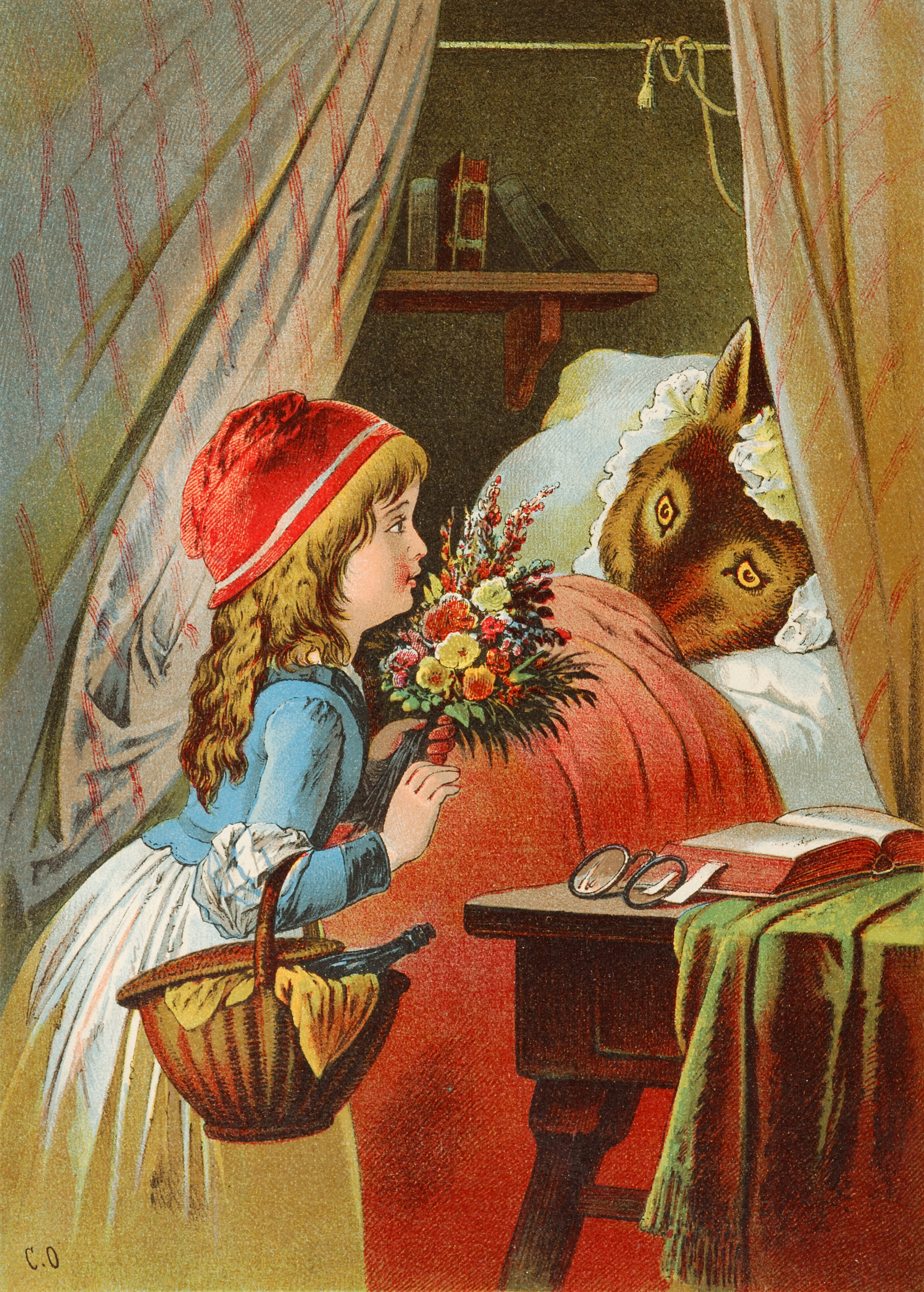
Illustration of Little Red Riding Hood

Offterdinger was a student of Heinrich von Rustige. In the second half of the 19th century, Offterdinger illustrated numerous children's books, fairy tales, adventure stories, and broadsheets.

Offterdinger is particularly known for his paintings with scenes from fairy tales and illustrations of literary works such as The Nutcracker and the Mouse King by E.T.A. Hoffmann, Till Eulenspiegel, Robinson Crusoe, fairy tales from the Brothers Grimm, the Leatherstocking Tales, and Gulliver's Travels. In 1874, he illustrated the first edition of Theodor Storm's novella Pole Poppenspäler in the journal German youth.

Heinrich Leutemann and Carl Offterdinger illustrated a German fairytale collection, Mein erstes Märchenbuch (My first Fairytale Book), published at the end of the 19th century.

Some of his illustrations are now included in the Boston Harbor Museum.
