= Frans Krajcberg =

Polish-Brazilian artist

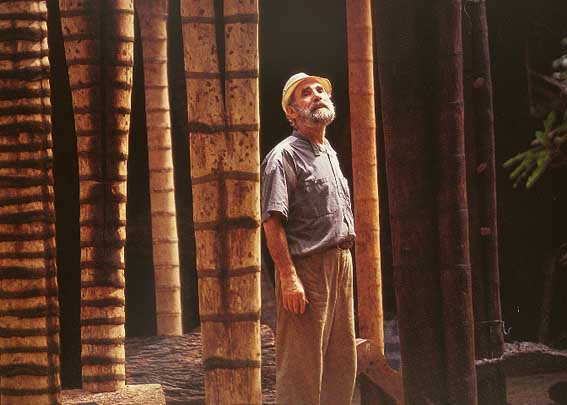
- Krajcberg in 1985
- Born: 12 April 1921; Kozienice, Poland
- Died: 15 November 2017 (aged 96); Rio de Janeiro, Brazil
- Citizenship: Brazil
- Occupations: Painter, sculptor, engraver and photographer

Frans Krajcberg (12 April 1921 – 15 November 2017) was a Polish-born Brazilian painter, sculptor, engraver and photographer. Krajcberg found peace after World War II through nature, and after moving to São Paulo in 1948 his connection with the natural world drove him to use mixed-medium art for environmental activism from the 1960s onward. Known for his environmental activism, Krajcberg denounced the destruction of the Brazilian forests, using materials such as burnt wood from illegal forest fires in his artworks.

== Biography ==
A Polish Jew, Krajcberg was born in Kozienice in 1921. His family died or disappeared in The Holocaust. He was arrested at the age of 13 during this time, but escaped to join the Russian army in World War II. Upon being hospitalized at a station in Minsk, he began painting while in recovery. He fought in the Polish Army during World War II as an officer from 1941-1945. After the war, Krajcberg sought refuge in the Soviet Union, where he studied engineering and art at the Leningrad State University. He then studied in Germany at the State Academy of Fine Arts Stuttgart, where he was a student of Willi Baumeister. Krajcberg came to Brazil in 1948 and participated in the first São Paulo Biennial in 1951. During the 1940s and 1950s he produced abstract art. From 1948 to 1954 he traveled between Paris, Ibiza and Rio de Janeiro, where he made his first nature-based art works.

In 1956, Krajcberg moved to Rio de Janeiro, where he shared a studio with the sculptor Franz Weissmann. With little money to his name, he began his career in Rio de Janeiro, starting his involvement in the art community through working at the Museum of Modern Art there. He became a naturalized Brazilian the following year. After a period of moving between Spain and France from 1958-1962 and working with Japanese paper, he returned to Brazil. He began a period of working in a cave in Pico de Itabirito, Minas Gerais with this Japanese paper to record imprints of the rocks, and also used minerals found there as natural pigments for paint. In 1964, Krajcberg made his first sculptures with cedar wood. He made several trips to the Amazon Forest and Pantanal, photographing and documenting deforestation, as well as gathering materials for his works, like roots and charred tree trunks.

In the 1970s, Kracjberg gained international recognition in the context of environmental movements garnering attention at the same time. Krajcberg lived in the south of Bahia from 1972 on, where he kept his studio on the Sítio Natura farm in Nova Viçosa. On Sítio Natura, he creates housing on a pequi tree with different raw materials, expressing through this his desire to remain secluded from humanity, which he viewed as destructive. Five additional buildings are meant to be added to his studio and turned into a museum, as the site presently houses over 300 pieces of work by Kracjberg.

In 1978, he co-directed a film, Manifesto do Naturalismo Integral (or Manifesto do Río Negro), with Pierre Restany and Sepp Baendereck. It documents the Amazonian nature encountered on a trip they took to Rio Negro. Their purpose was to highlight the destruction occurring and show their opposition to it. He was also actively documenting illegal forest fires through photographic reports, and continually denounced them with his burnt wood sculptures throughout the 1980s.

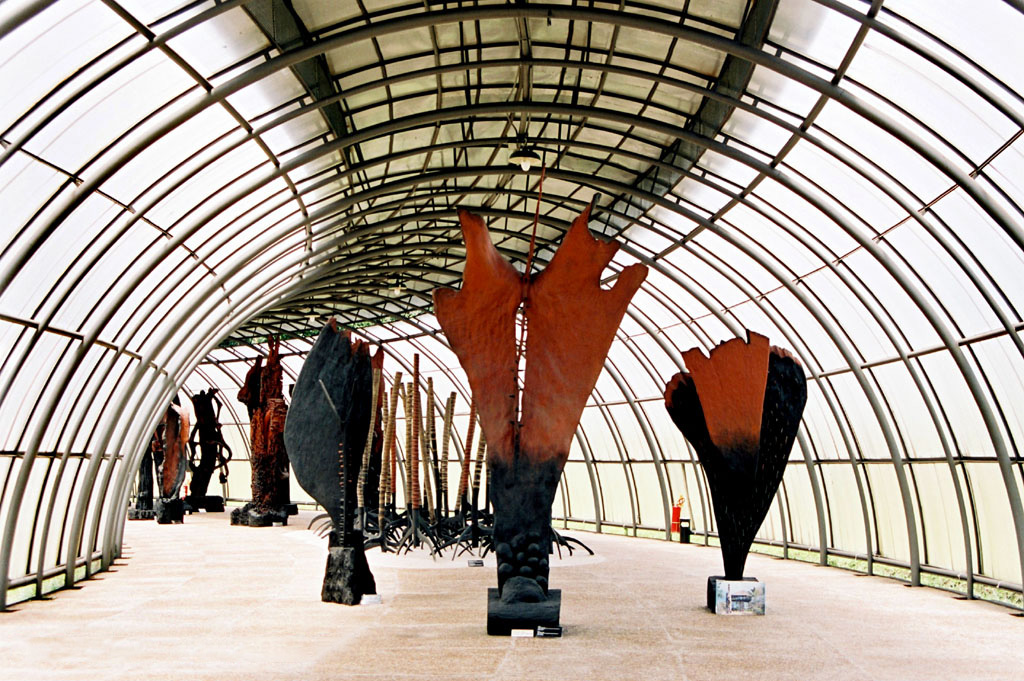
Espaço Frans Krajcberg, em Curitiba. Photo:Sam Emerick/flickr

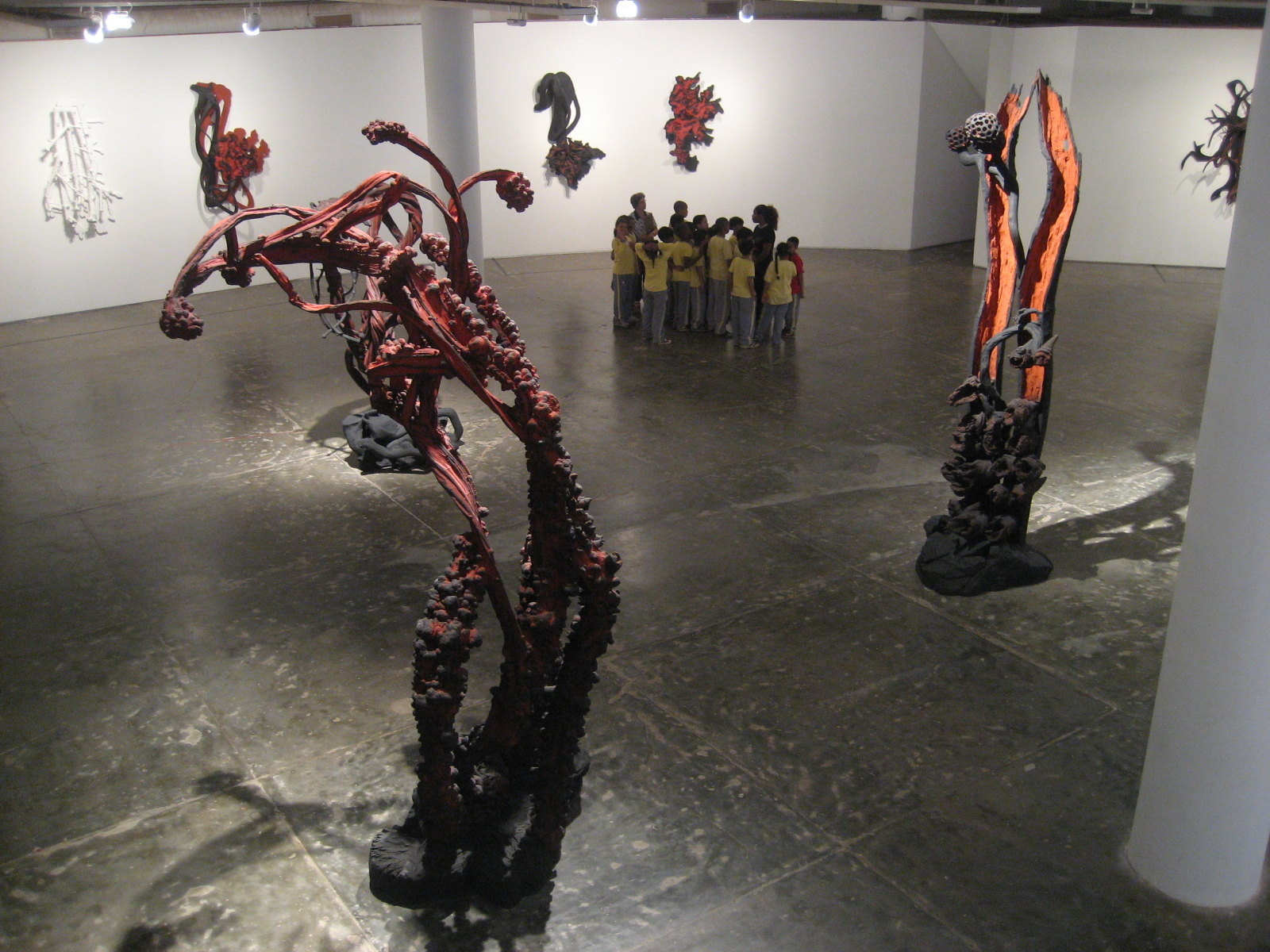
Frans Krajcberg's works at the Natura exhibition, in São Paulo.

Krajcberg died on 15 November 2017, aged 96, at the Hospital Samaritano in Rio de Janeiro.

== Examples of Past Works ==
Tema craquelada: reliefs, usually with monochromatic pigments made from soils and minerals. One example has a flower overlaid on a piece of wood, with both painted red and contrasting a yellow background. Another has multiple different shades of gold on different parts of a relief that can be perceived as looking mountainous and sharp.

Wooden sculptures: Kracjberg's wooden sculptures are typically noticed for connecting to themes of life, death, and destruction, tying to life cycles seen with forest fires in the Amazon.

Révolte- a tree trunk curved horizontally, bent over, and covered in natural pigment. It has lines carved throughout the figure, and an oval created by two branches meeting.

Homage do Chico Mendes- another wood sculpture using charred wood, resembling a stoic man or soldier standing tall. It is mostly black, but red lines running throughout symbolize blood. Referencing rubber-taper Chico Mendes, a man assassinated for environmental activism, Kracjberg explores the mass scales of environmental destruction driven by human greed.

Raiz- a wooden sculpture, completely black, depicting a root-like web structure.

Flor do Mangue- charred bark from previous trees sculpted into the shape of a mangrove tree, with wooden leaves touching the floor and creating a cage-like structure, resembling the mangrove. It is completely blackened, with a white vine of nuts climbing up one side. Mangroves notably were a common tree found in Kracjberg's property of Sitio Natura.

== See also ==
- List of Brazilian painters
