= Carry van Biema =

German artist (1881–1942)

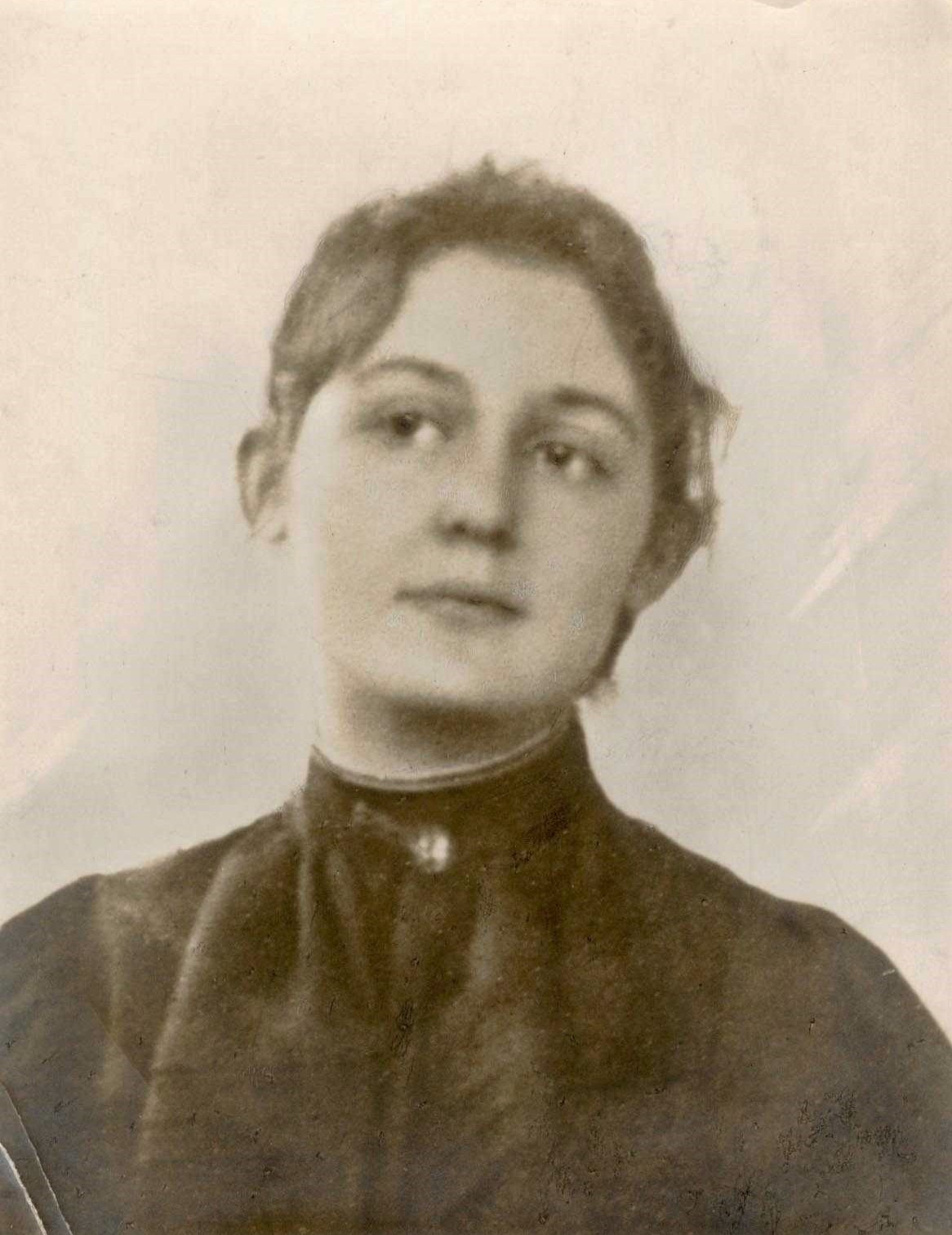
- Born: October 17, 1881; Hanover, Germany
- Died: August 31, 1942 (aged 60); Auschwitz concentration camp, Oświęcim, Poland

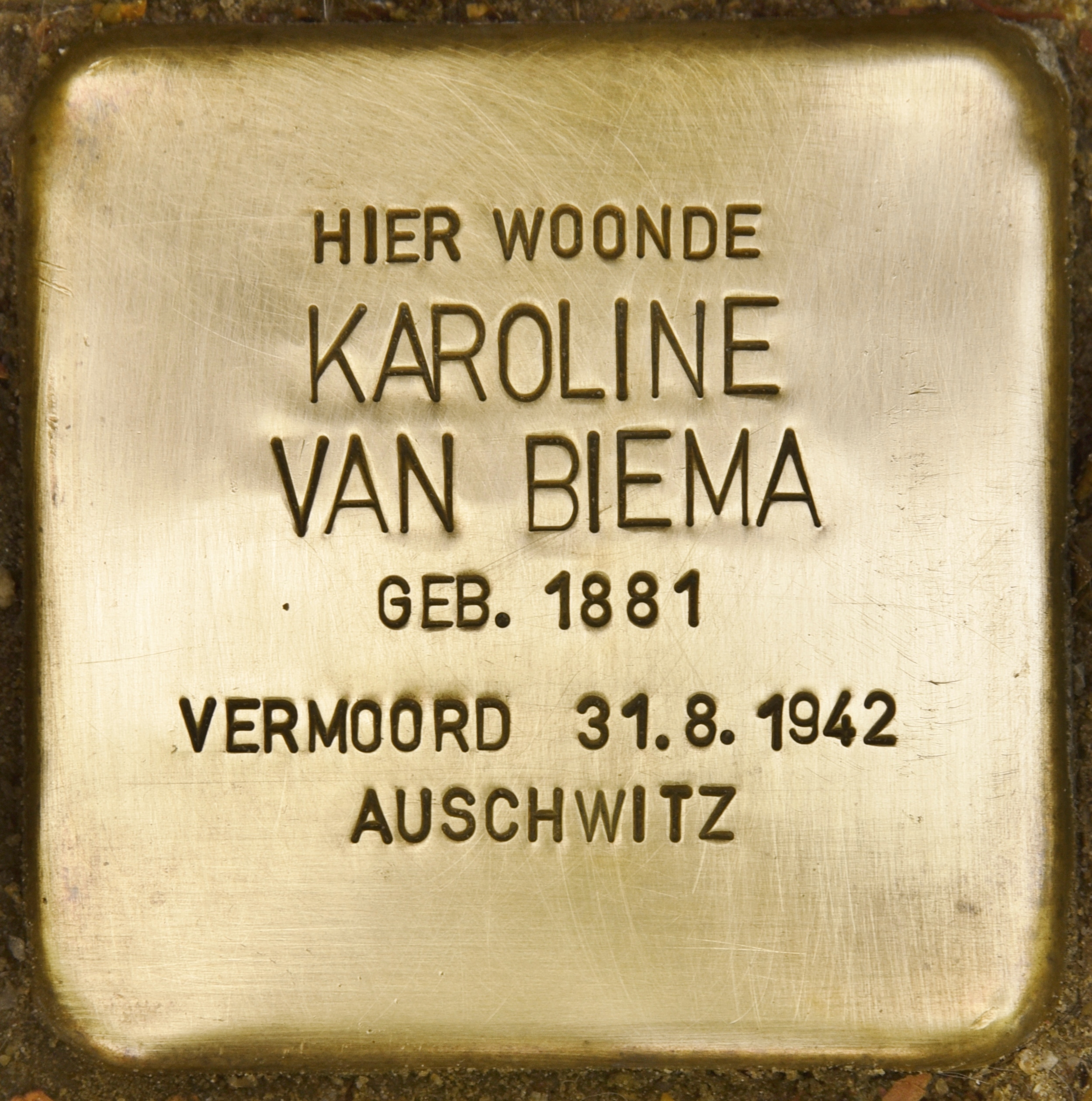
Stolperstein für Karoline van Biema (Utrecht)

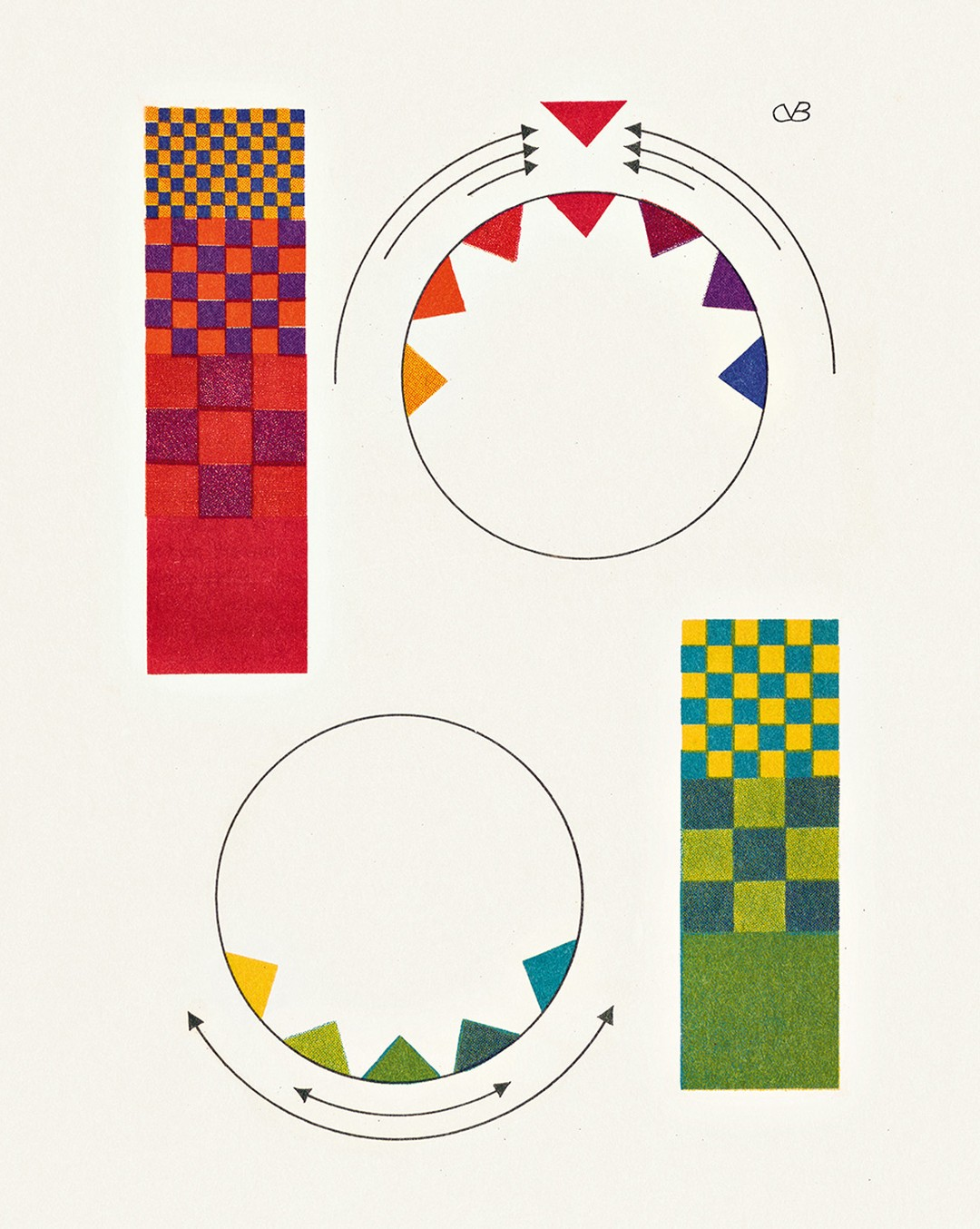
Carry van Biema—Colors and Forms as Living Forces

Karoline "Carry" van Biema (1881–1942) was a German artist. She is known for her work in color theory.

Biema was born on October 17, 1881 in Hanover, Germany. she studied at the Academy of Fine Arts in The Hague. She also studied under Adolf Hölzel at the State Academy of Fine Arts Stuttgart.

Biema was the author of the color theory textbook Farben und Formen als lebendige Kräfte (Colors and Forms as Living Forces). She lived for a time in Spain and then, in 1938, she moved to the Netherlands. She was murdered at Auschwitz concentration camp on August 31, 1942.

Her 1920 portrait of the poet Albrecht Schaeffer is in the Sprengel Museum. An example of her drawing is in the British Museum.

A stolperstein in her honor is in Utrecht, Netherlands.
