= Tesfaye Urgessa =

Ethiopian-born German visual artist (b. 1983)

- ተስፋዬ ገለታ ኡርጌሳ
- Born: 1983 (age 42–43); Addis Ababa, Ethiopia
- Education: Allé School of Fine Arts and Design, State Academy of Fine Arts Stuttgart (MA)
- Occupation: Visual artist
- Known for: Painting

Tesfaye Geleta Urgessa (born 1983; Amharic: ተስፋዬ ገለታ ኡርጌሳ) is an Ethiopian-born painter. He is from Addis Ababa, and has been based in Germany since 2009.

== Career ==
Tesfaye Urgessa was born in 1983 in Addis Ababa, Ethiopia. He studied under Mezgebu Tessema, Tadesse Mesfin, and Bisrat Shibabaw in Ethiopia. He graduated from the Allé School of Fine Arts and Design in Addis Ababa in 2006; and received a M.A. degree in 2014 from the State Academy of Fine Arts Stuttgart in Stuttgart, Germany.

Urgessa was taught by professors who had studied art in Russia in the 1970s and 1980s, when the dominant art movement was socialist realism. Their focus was on the study of anatomy, which influenced Urgessa’s style.

At this time, through internet research, Urgessa's practice was inspired by prominent artists in Europe including Picasso, Lucian Freud and Francis Bacon.

Urgessa is represented by White Cube gallery.

== Themes ==
Tesfaye Urgessa’s images have themes of racism, class, police brutality, injustice in politics and power. He combines traditional figuration with Ethiopian iconography, Cubism, and 1980s German Neo-expressionism.

== Exhibitions ==
Urgessa exhibited in "Oltre/Beyond" at The Uffizi Gallerie in Florence in 2018, and again in 2021. The Uffizi also hosts his work in its permanent collection, and "Von Denen Die Auszogen" at State Galerie Villa Streccius, in Landau Germany in 2019.

Urgessa represented Ethiopia at the 60th International Art Exhibition – La Biennale di Venezia in 2024, the first time that the country has participated with a national pavilion.

== Exhibitions ==
- 2015, Body and Soul, Sympra GmbH, Stuttgart, Germany
- 2015, Free Fall, Galerie Evelyn Drewes, Hamburg, Germany
- 2015, Untitled, Galerie K, Köln, Germany
- 2016, Ethiopia Today - Begegnung mit Äthiopien, Kunstation Kleinassen, Hofbieber-Kleinassen
- 2016, Fremdkörper, Schacher – Raum für Kunst, Stuttgart, Germany
- 2017, Auszeit, Galerieverein Wendlingen, Wendlingen, Germany
- 2017, Free Fall, Galerie Evelyn Drewes, Hamburg, Germany
- 2018, No Country for Young Men, Galerieverein Leonberg, Leonberg, Germany
- 2018, Oltre/Beyond, Uffizi Gallery, Florence, Italy
- 2019, Atemzug, Galerie Tobias Schrade, Ulm, Germany
- 2019, Ich Halte Dich Festhalten, Schacher – Raum für Kunst, Stuttgart, Germany
- 2019, No Country for Young Men, Addis Fine Art, Addis Ababa, Ethiopia
- 2019, Von Denen Die Auszogen, State Galerie Villa, Streccius, Landau, Germany
- 2025, Roots of Resilience, Sainsbury Centre, Norwich, UK

== Awards ==
- 2014, Akademiepreis der Kunstakademie Stuttgart, Germany
- 2010, Camillo-Michele-Gloria-Preis, GasVersorgung Süddeutschland, Stuttgart, Germany
