= Oswald Oberhuber =

Austrian painter (1931–2020)

- Born: 1 February 1931; Merano, Italy
- Died: 17 January 2020 (aged 88); Vienna, Austria
- Occupation: Artist

Oswald Oberhuber (1 February 1931 – 17 January 2020) was an Austrian painter, sculptor, and graphic artist.

== Biography ==
Oberhuber learned sculpture at the Federal Trade School in Innsbruck. He also studied at the Academy of Fine Arts Vienna and the State Academy of Fine Arts Stuttgart. In 1972, Oberhuber represented Austria at the Venice Biennale. The following year, he became a professor at the University of Applied Arts Vienna, where he worked until his retirement in 1998. The State Academy of Fine Arts Stuttgart recognized Oberhuber as an honorary member in 1982, and as an honorary senator in 2004.

== Awards ==
- Vienna Fine Arts Prize (1978)
- Tyrolean State Arts Prize (1990)
- Austrian State Prize (1990)
- Cross of the Decoration of Honour for Services to the Republic of Austria (2004)
