= Paul Wilhelm Keller-Reutlingen =

German artist (1854–1920)

- Born: Paul Wilhelm Keller; 2 February 1854; Reutlingen, Kingdom of Württemberg
- Died: 10 January 1920 (aged 65); Munich, Weimar Republic
- Education: State Academy of Fine Arts Stuttgart; Academy of Fine Arts, Munich
- Spouse: Albertine Wetzel (m. 1898)

Paul Wilhelm Keller-Reutlingen (Note: Keller's legal name was Paul Wilhelm Keller; Reutlingen—his birthplace—was added to his pen name to distinguish him from other individuals with the same name.) (2 February 1854 – 10 January 1920) was a German landscape and genre painter.

== Biography ==
Keller was born on 2 February 1854 in Reutlingen, the sixth of eight children to privateer Heinrich Adolf Keller (1815–1890) and Caroline Keller (née Finckh; 1819–1871).

At his parents' request, Keller was trained in xylography by Adolf Closs from 1868 to 1872. Through a recommendation by Closs, Keller would go on to study painting under Bernhard von Neher at the Academy of Fine Arts in Stuttgart from 1872 to 1873. From 1873 to 1874, he was mentored by Otto Seitz at the Academy of Fine Arts in Munich. From 1874 to 1875, he completed his training in a painting class of Carl von Häberlin at Stuttgart.

After his studies were finished, Keller served in Wilhelm I's 26th Dragoon Regiment, where he rose to the rank of lieutenant. Keller spent the latter half of the 1870s travelling Italy and completing his earliest major works—cityscapes and landscapes of the country.

Keller settled in Fürstenfeldbruck, outside of Munich, in 1879. At this time, he would move on to genre paintings set in the Dachau region and the Swabian Alps. These paintings were typically romantic depictions of forests and rural life, giving particular attention to atmospheric lighting. In 1898, Keller married actress Albertine Wetzel (1867–1926; died by suicide).

In 1893, Keller joined the Munich Secession. He also participated in art exhibitions at the Glaspalast and the Große Berliner Kunstausstellung. Keller's paintings have been displayed in museums across Germany throughout and after his lifetime. He died in Munich in 1920.

== Selected works ==
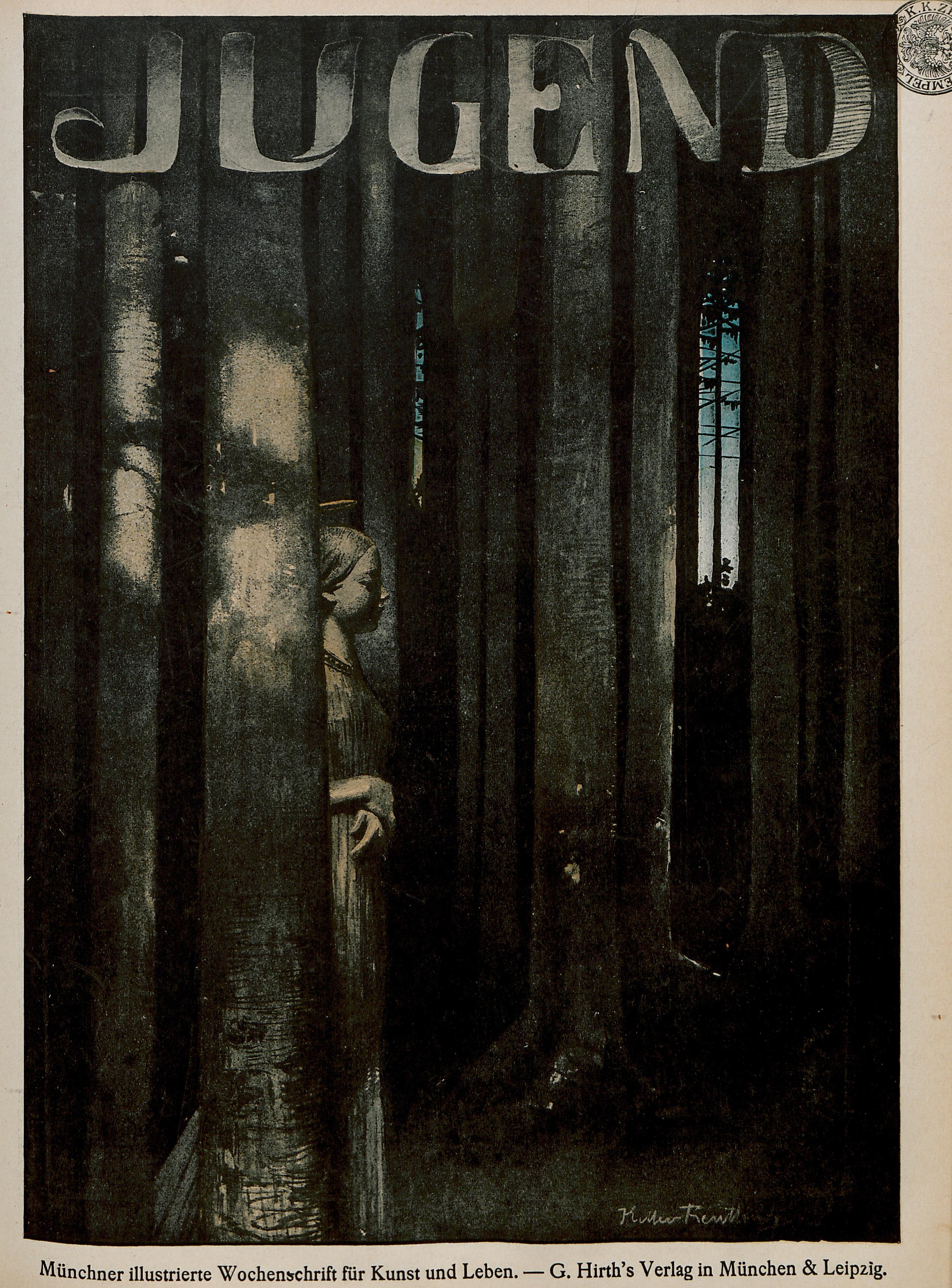
Cover of Jugend, 11 April 1896

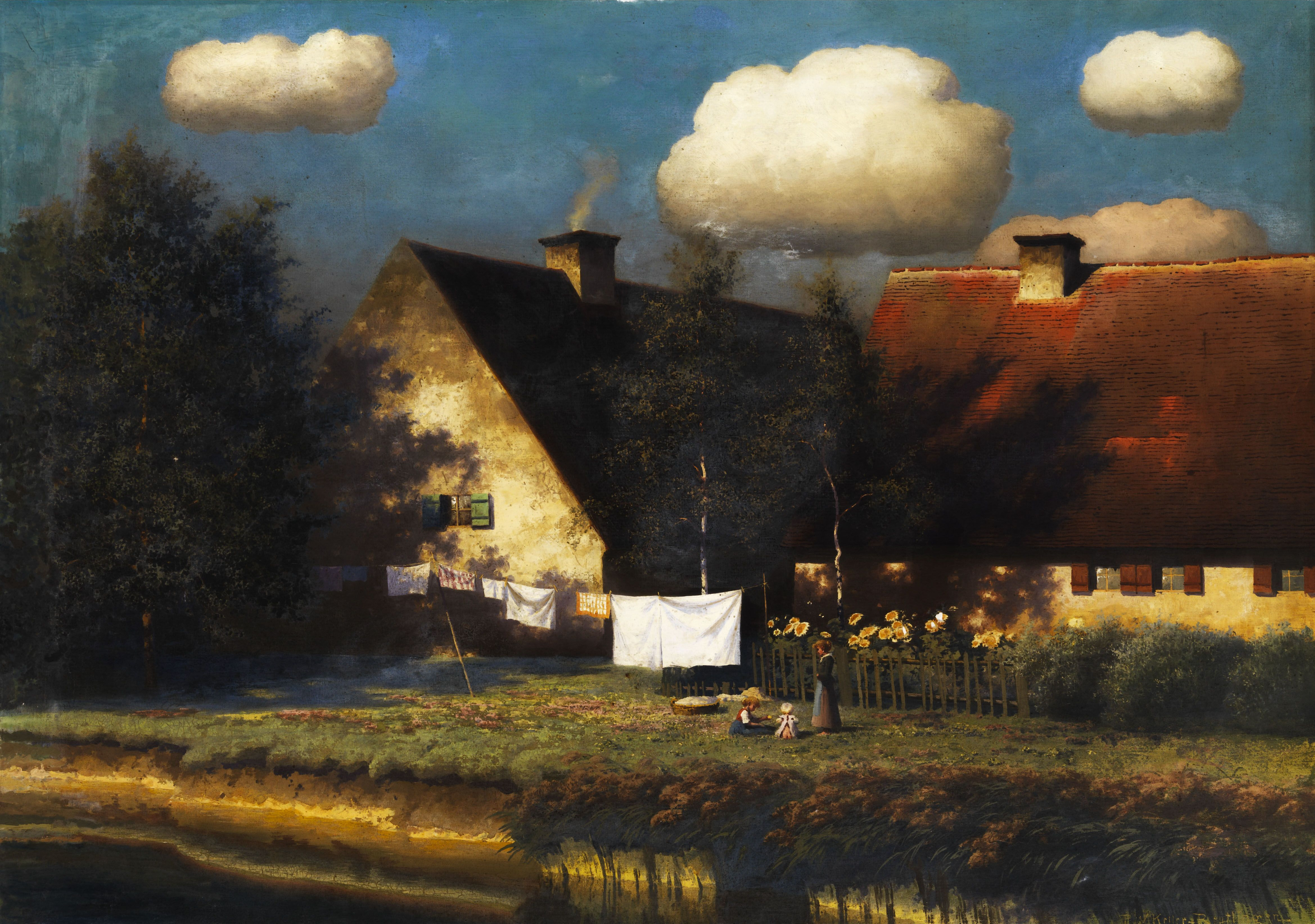
Farmstead Under Clouds in Late Summer Light, before 1920

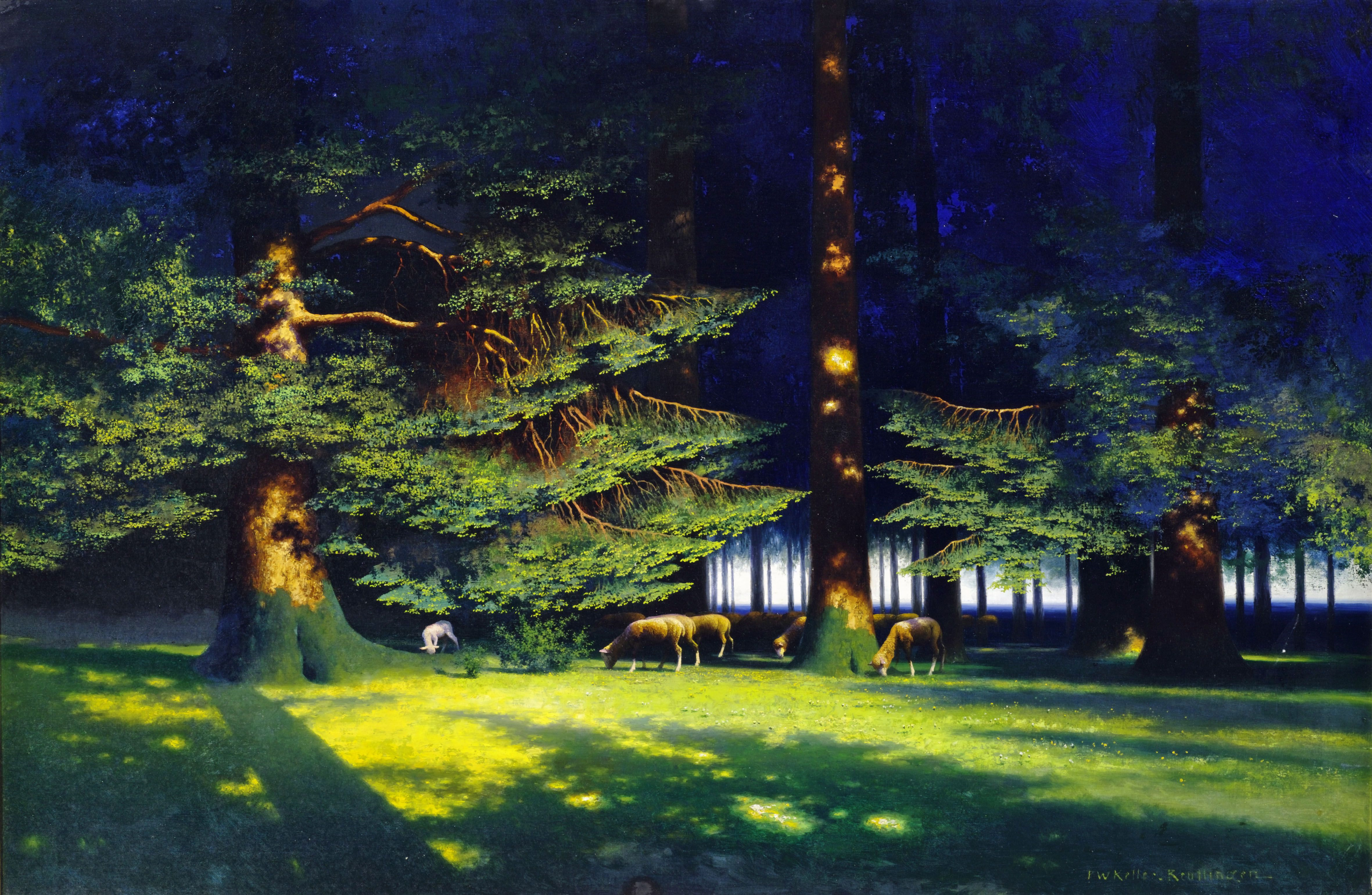
Forest Interior with Grazing Flock of Sheep, before 1920

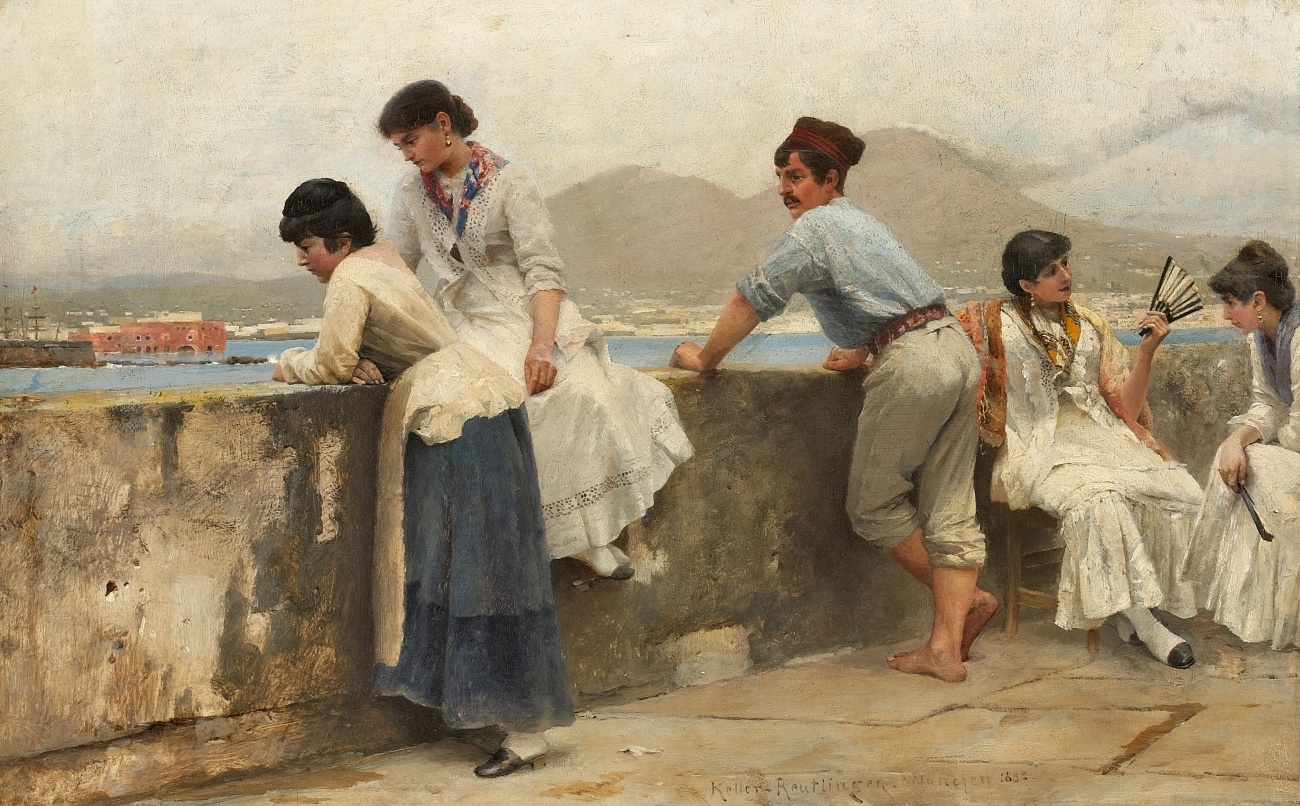
Young Italians in Front of the Bay of Naples, 1887

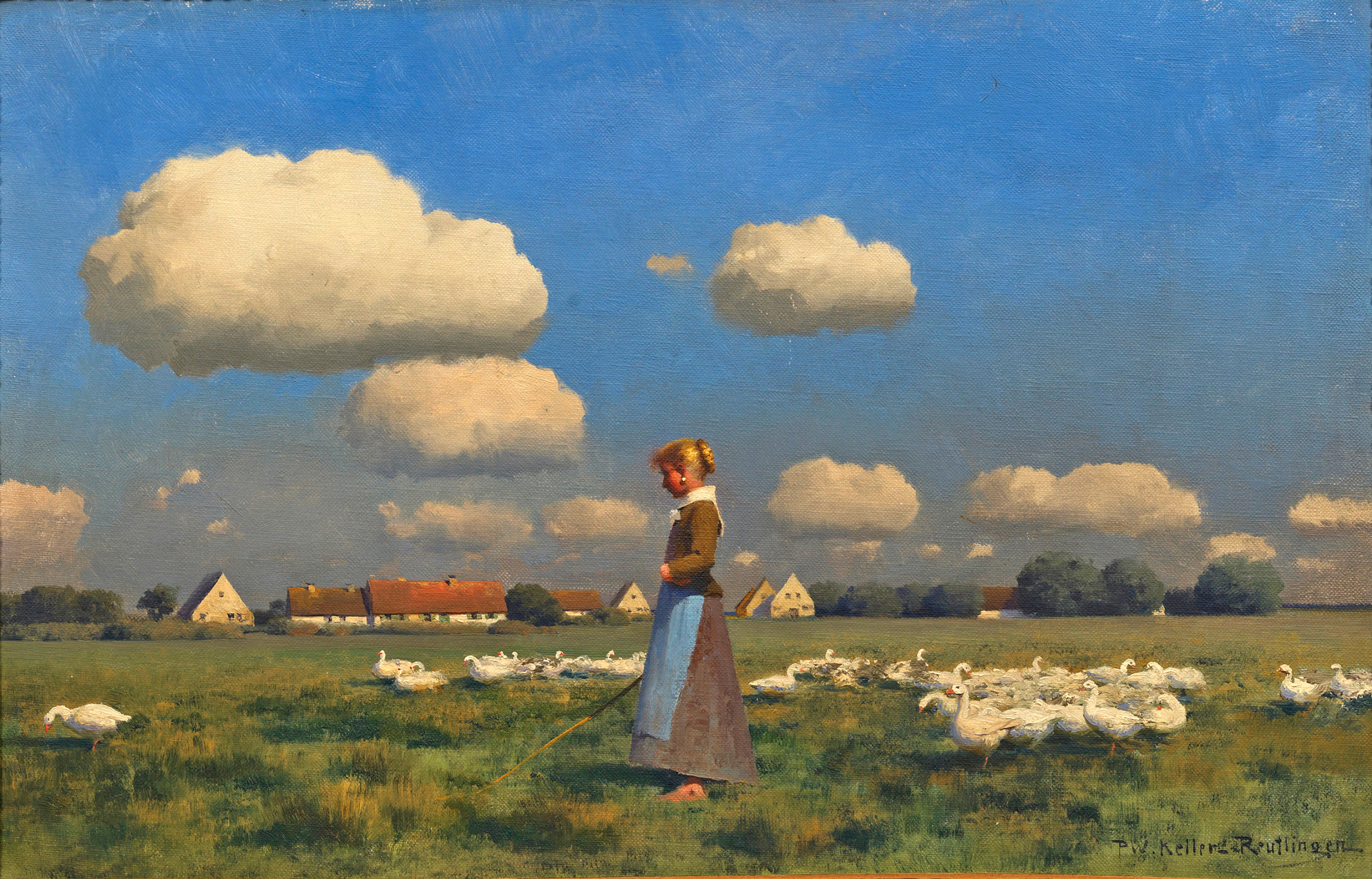
Young Goose Girl in a Meadow, before 1920
