= Alfred Heinrich Pellegrini =

Alfred Heinrich Pellegrini (10 January 1881 – 5 August 1958) was a Swiss painter, illustrator and printmaker. Along with Heinrich Altherr, Paul Bodmer and Walter Clénin, he was one of the most prolific Swiss muralists of the first half of the twentieth century.

== Biography ==
A. H. Pellegrini was born in Basel, the son of Isodoro Pellegrini, a stone sculptor from Stabio in the Italian part of Switzerland. After high school, A. H. Pellegrini matriculated at the Basel Craftschool where he studied under Fritz Schider and Albrecht Wagen. He also worked under his brother, Isidoro Pellegrini the Younger, as an apprentice in the tombstone sculptures business founded by his father. From 1899 to 1901, he studied with Gabriel von Hackl at the Academy of Fine Arts Munich, after which he returned to Basel. In the summer of 1901, Pellegrini returned to Switzerland. After being exempted from military service due to his frail constitution, he spent the following years in the mountainous region of central Switzerland. In 1904 he married Marie Kneubühler in Geneva. By 1906 he was a member of the Munich Secession art cooperative and working in Stuttgart, first as an illustrator and then as a commercial artist. While continuing as a commercial artist, beginning in 1908, he took lessons from Adolf Hölzel at the State Academy of Fine Arts in Stuttgart (Staatliche Akademie der Bildenden Künste Stuttgart). In the 1913 schism he went with the "New Munich Secession", and in 1914 moved to Munich. In 1917 he returned to Basel.

In 1948, Pellegrini was awarded the Kulturpreis (Culture Prize) of the city of Basel.

== Works ==
In addition to his teachers, Pelligrini was influenced by Ferdinand Hodler, Paul Gauguin and Edvard Munch. Pelligrini's works include panel paintings and frescoes, portraits, landscapes and sketches. His friendship with the architect Theodor Fischer enabled him to receive commissions for murals, for example in 1909 he completed a mural for the church in Kirchheim unter Teck. In 1917, after a design competition, Pellegrini finished the fresco at St. Jakobskirche in Basel, showing Arnold Schick's famous stone's throw at the Battle of St. Jakob an der Birs in 1444 that killed the knight Burkhard VII. Included among Pellegrini's many murals, by far the largest number of which are in Basel, are the 1922 mural on the Basel Stock Exchange and the large mural of Apollo and the Muses, on the front of the Stadtcasino Basel which was completed in 1941.

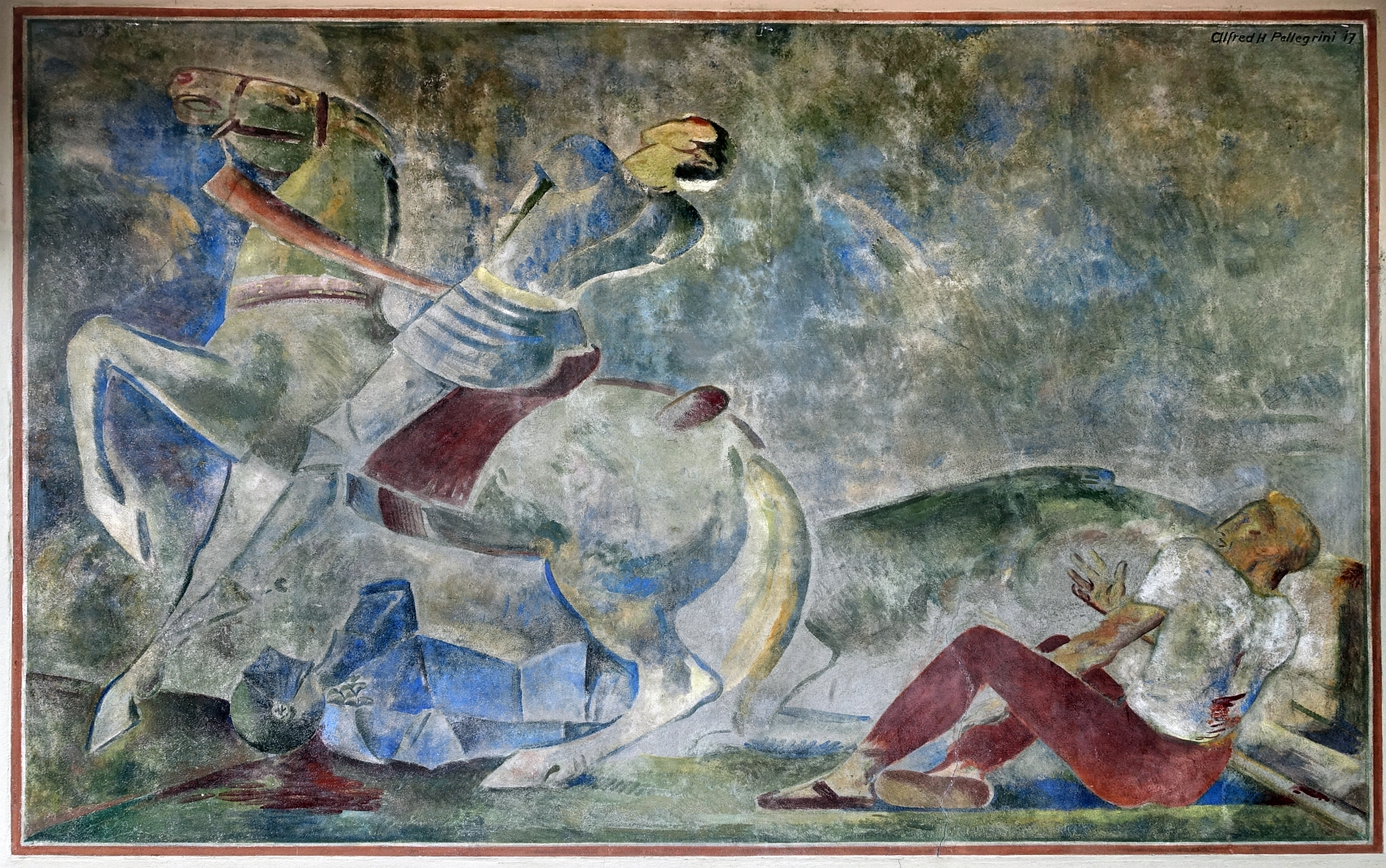
1917 mural of the Battle of St. Jakob an der Birs

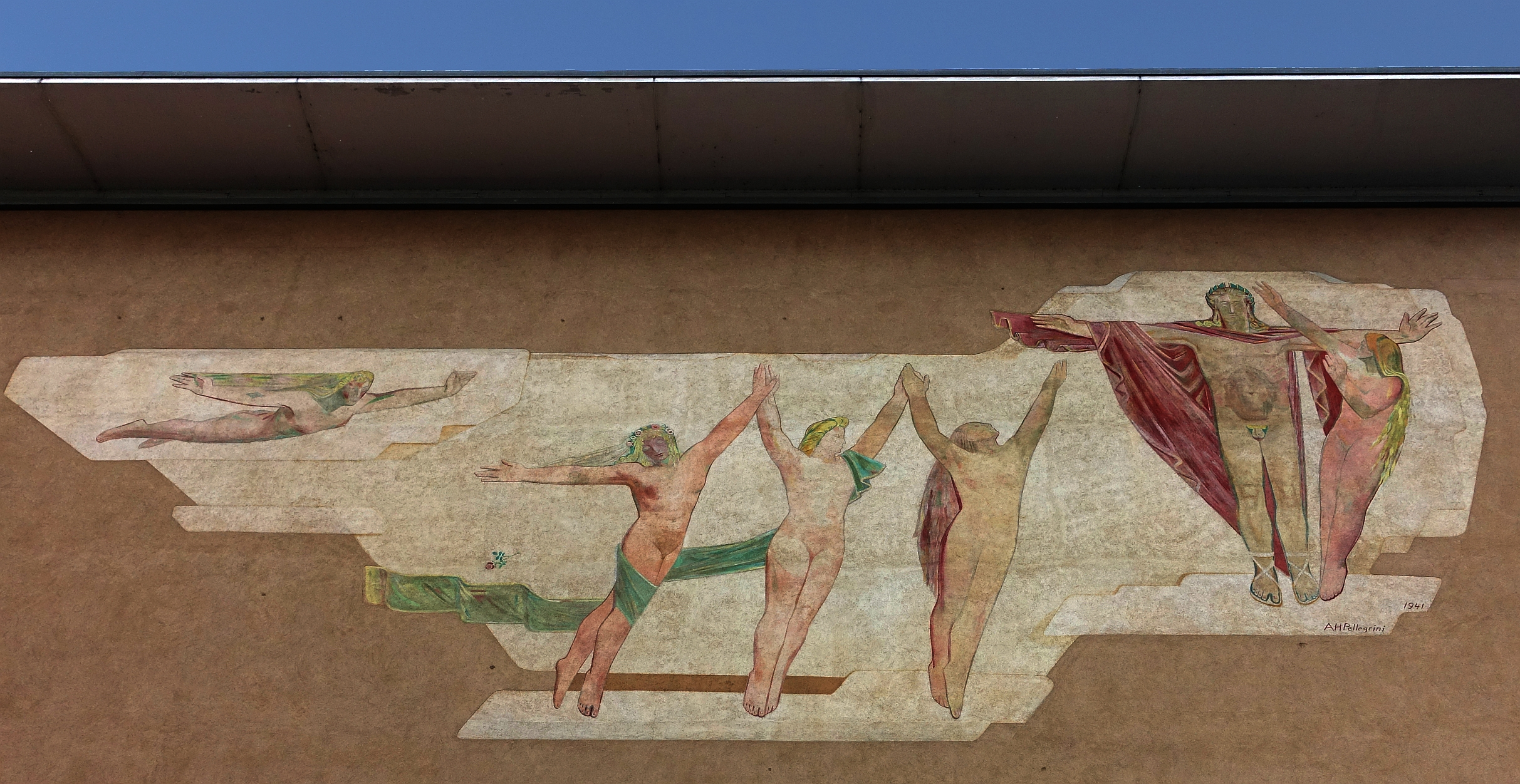
1940/1941 mural

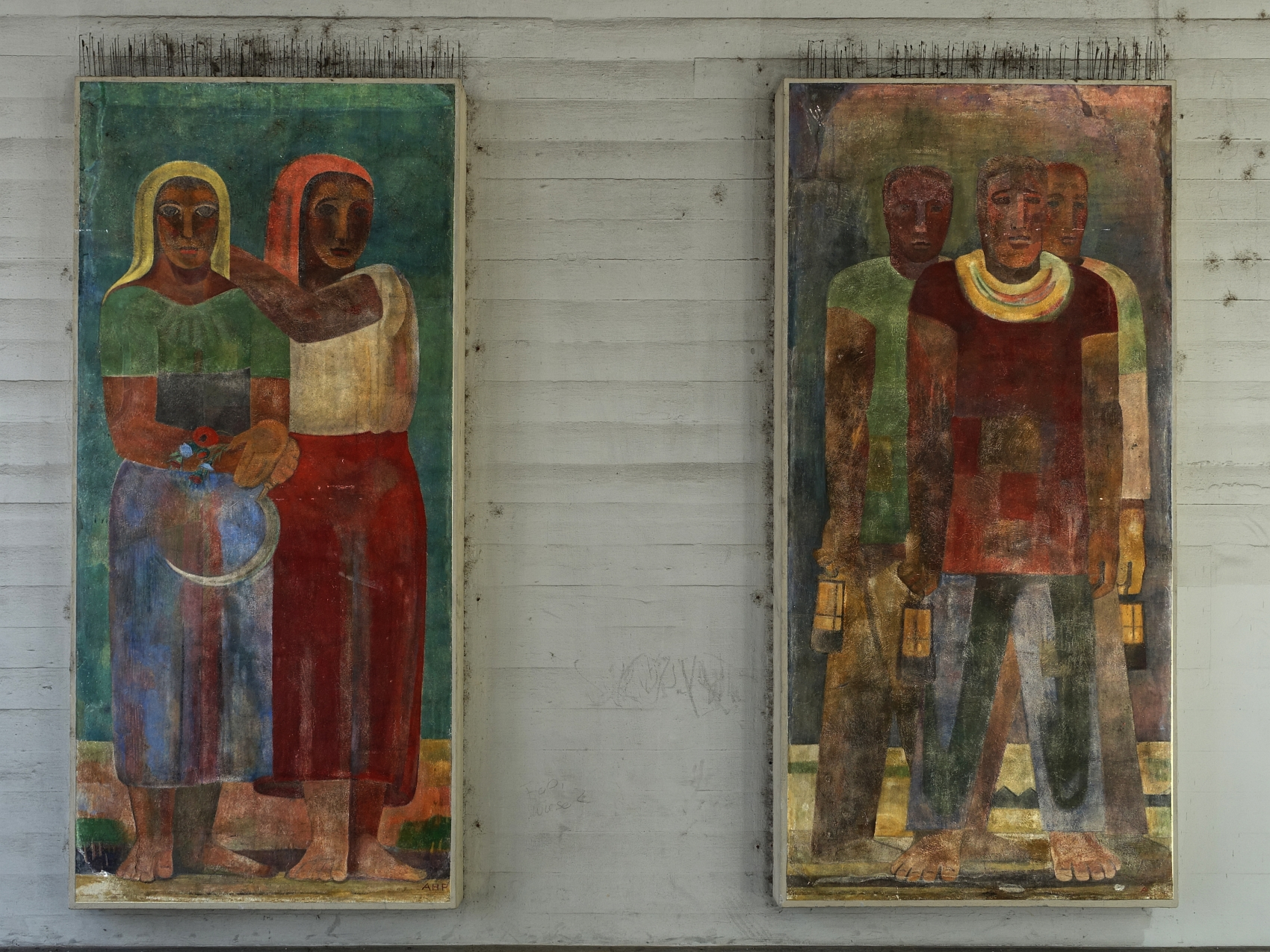
1922 mural

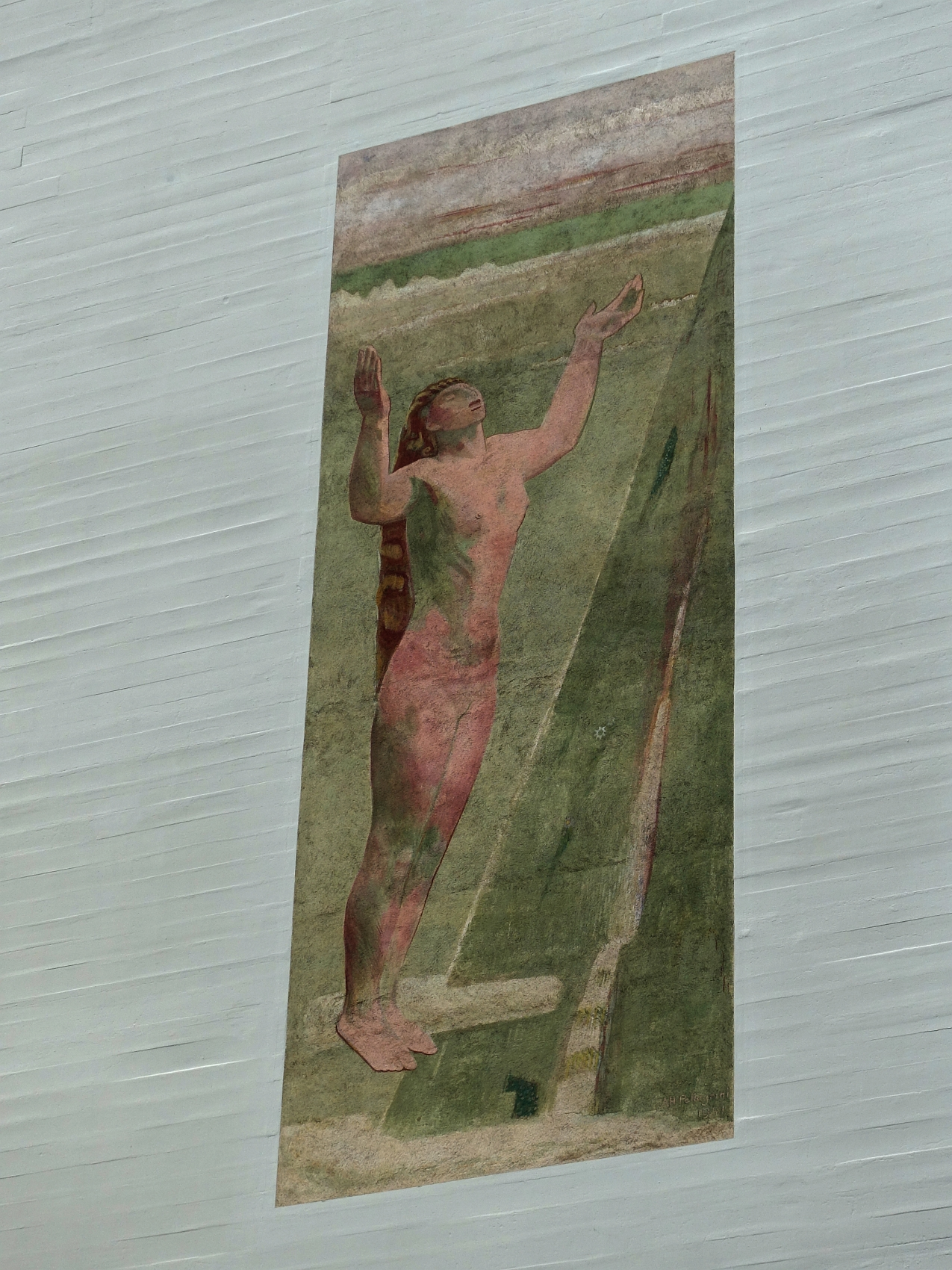
1941 mural
