= Else Raydt =

German artist and craftswoman (1883–1931)

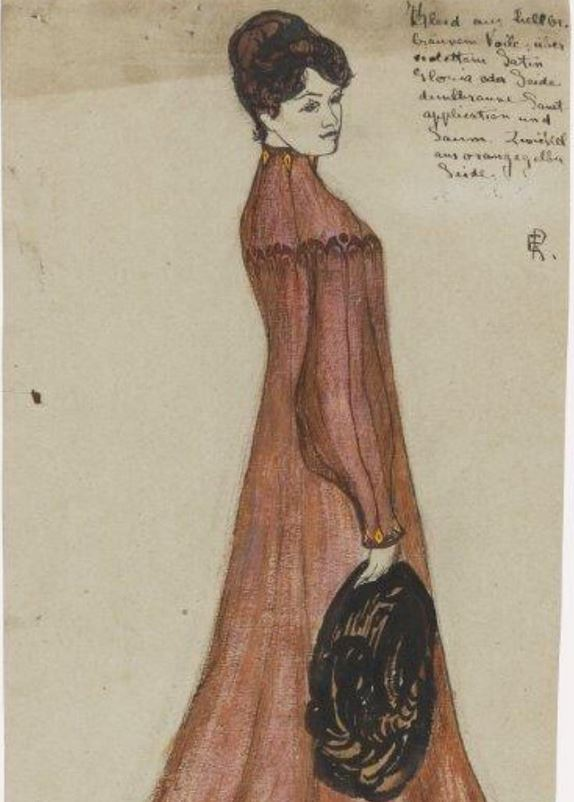
Design of dress by Else Raydt

Else Raydt (22 November 1883 in Hanover – 24 January 1931 in Magdeburg) was a German painter, graphic artist and craftswoman. She gained fame for her dress designs and children's book illustrations. She led the fashion class at the Magdeburg School of Arts and Crafts and was a professor there from 1921 until her untimely death.

== Biography ==
Else (also Elsa or Elise) Raydt (also Reidt) was the daughter of Marie Helena Gesa Raydt née Gruner (born c. 1850 in Pyrmont; died 12 June 1921 in Magdeburg) and the chemist, high school teacher, inventor, and entrepreneur Wilhelm Carl Raydt. Her older brother was the engineer Alfred Johann Hermann Raydt (12 February 1872 in Hanover – 20 March 1943 in Eltville).

In 1894, the Raydt family moved to Stuttgart. Through her brother's marriage to Helene Leonore Brüxner in 1899, the art historian Heinrich Brockhaus and other members of the Brockhaus family of publishers in Leipzig were also among her extended family.

Else Raydt was first trained as a painter. She studied from the winter semester of 1899/1900 to the summer semester of 1900 as an extraordinary student at the Königlich Württembergische Kunstschule, later at the school of the Verein der Berliner Künstlerinnen and with Johann Vincenz Cissarz in Stuttgart.

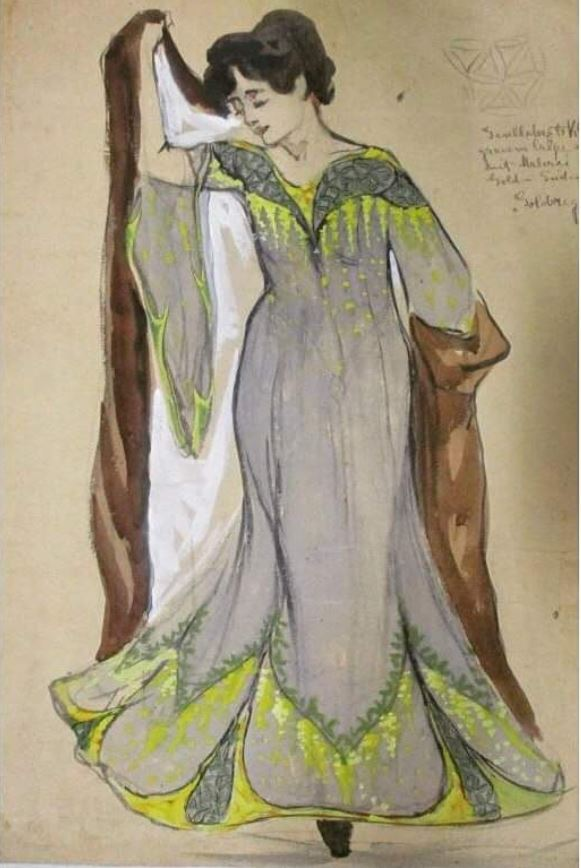
Draft of dress design, by Else Raydt

In 1913, according to the address book, "Else Raydt, Kunstmalerin" was registered on the second floor of the house at Birkenstraße 16 in Stuttgart. She thus lived in one of the houses in the Birkendörfle built from 1907 onwards. In 1915, Raydt moved together with her widowed mother to Magdeburg, where she was registered at the address Benediktinerstraße 2 until her death. Else Raydt died in Magdeburg on 24 January 1931, at the age of 47.

== Work ==
In the Stuttgarter Mitteilungen über Kunst und Gewerbe 1905/1906, dress designs by various female artists are discussed in detail. Many of the models with illustrations are by Else Raydt. During this period, she designed artists' dresses that were worn without constricting corsets and operated a workshop for women's clothing before 1915. Beginning in 1910, Else Raydt lectured on reform fashions at lecture events, as did her colleagues Emmy Schoch, Maria Thierbach, and Hedwig Buschmann. The lectures placed an emphasis on aesthetic dress design as well as cutting and manufacturing techniques. They were often combined with the presentation of dress models. The Kunstmuseen Krefeld has a larger number of the artist's design drawings and showed a selection on the occasion of the exhibition Tailored for Freedom at the Kaiser Wilhelm Museum (2018/19).

In Germany during the First World War, industry and associations, including the Deutscher Werkbund, endeavored to develop a nationally independent fashion. Raw materials were scarce and fashion impulses from the wartime enemies France and England were undesirable. In 1915, with state support, the first fashion class in an art school in Germany was opened at the Magdeburg School of Arts and Crafts under the then director Rudolf Bosselt (1871–1938). The goal was to reach out to foreign countries and conquer the German and European markets by developing high-quality German fashion lines.

In filling the position, Bosselt wanted teachers "who had a special gift for clothing, for being well and advantageously dressed, who had the weather for the times, for what was to come, might come." Else Raydt was appointed as head of the fashion workshops in 1915. She initially led the specialized class for women's clothing under the artistic supervision of Kurt Tuch. The curriculum included general design principles, dress design, anatomy, nude drawing, and practical lessons in the workshop. The first fashion show with the fashion class's own dress designs took place in Magdeburg and Berlin in 1916. The presentation embedded the dress show in a framework of music and literary performances and was widely discussed in contemporary journals.

In 1917, the company participated in one of the Werkbund exhibitions in Bern, Switzerland. The fashion show there was documented in a silent film. In the same year, Raydt commented on the goals of her work: "By the time peace is concluded, we must have a fashion that differs from that of France, and our large clothing houses and ready-to-wear factories will flood the world with this new German fashion." She lamented the difference in earnings between the well-paid industry in Paris and the poor conditions in Berlin, where "an army of miserably paid home workers toiled for the triumph of French fashion."
