= Carlos Grethe =

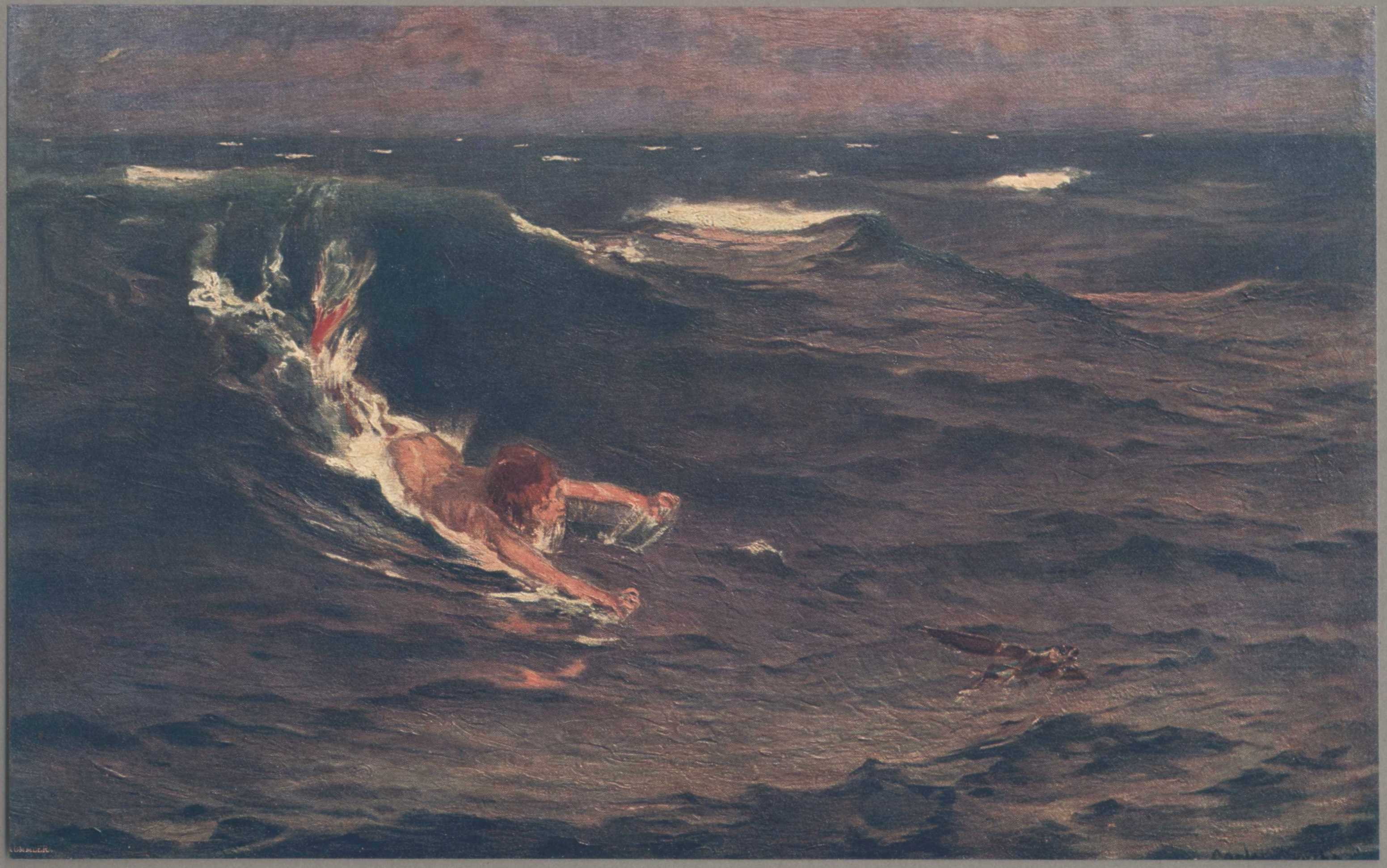
The Flying Fish

Carlos Grethe (25 September 1864 – 2 February 1913) was a Uruguayan-born German painter and academician.

== Life ==
Grethe was born in Montevideo, Uruguay, but lived in Hamburg from the age of five. He studied at the Fine Arts School of Paul Düyffcke at the Karlsruher Kunstakademie (first from 1882 to 1884, and then again from 1889 to 1890), as well as the Parisian Académie Julian from 1884 to 1886. He interrupted his studies for almost a year to undertake a sea voyage to Mexico in 1888 and 1889. He followed up by teaching at the Karlsruhe Kunstgewerbeschule and the academy there, and thereafter, in 1899, at the Kgl. Academy of Fine Arts in Stuttgart until his premature death. From 1894, Grethe was a member of the Munich Secession, and was also involved in the founding of the Karlsruher Künstlerbundes in 1896, the Stuttgarter Künstlerbundes, (the State Academy of Fine Arts in Stuttgart) in 1901, and the Verein Württembergischer Kunstfreunde. By the turn of the century Grethe had become prominent in representations of man and the sea, as well as of coasts and ports. His artistic style developed from a commitment to modern realism at the beginning of his career to a rather more impressionistic style in his later works.

Grethe died in 1913 in Nieuwpoort, Belgium.

== Literature ==
- Hamburger Ansichten – Maler sehen die Stadt. Hamburger Kunsthalle, Wienand Verlag, S. 186
- Ingrun Stocke: Carlos Grethe: der Maler des Meeres; 1864 - 1913; Leben und Werk. Kromsdorf: VDG Weimar 2008 ISBN 978-3-89739-602-9
