= Byung Chul Kim =

South Korean artist (born 1974)

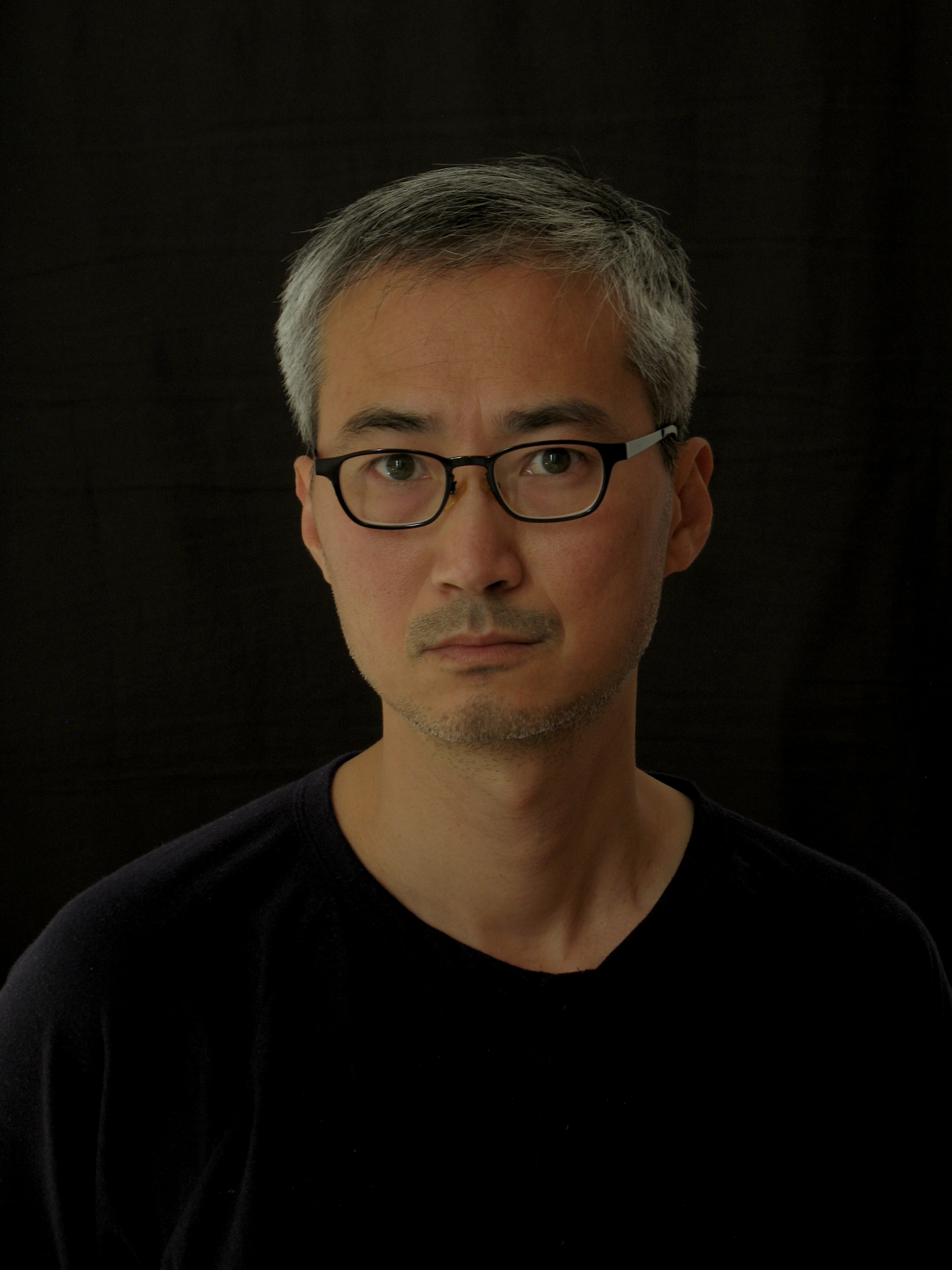

Korean name
- Hangul: 김병철
- RR: Gim Byeongcheol
- MR: Kim Pyŏngch'ŏl

Byung Chul Kim (Korean: 김병철; born 1974) is a South Korean artist based in Germany since 2004. He works in performance, drawing, painting and video.

== Life and work ==
Kim was born in Seoul, South Korea. Kim grew up in the interior of South Korea and spent his youth in Seoul, where he lived in a Buddhist monastery from age 15 to 17. He first studied Western painting at Seoul's Chugye University for the Arts before studying installation, performance and video with Christian Jankowski at the Academy of Fine Arts in Stuttgart, Germany. Kim also spent one semester in the Graduate Fine Art Program Master Class at the California College of the Arts in San Francisco. He graduated from the State Academy of Fine Arts in Stuttgart (Germany) with a state diploma in sculpture.

Kim is best known internationally for his year-long project Performance-Hotel (2009–2010), a participatory art project in Stuttgart's east. Like many of his other projects, Performance-Hotel focuses on Kim's quest for alternative means of exchange or an alternative exchange economy: in PerformanceHotel and Performance-Express (train journeys to Paris, Metz and Luxembourg, 2010–2011) a couchette or a train ticket could be obtained in exchange for a performance. In 2014, Kim was invited by the Kunsthalle Baden-Baden (Germany) to open another temporary “performance hotel” in Baden-Baden as part of the exhibition Room Service. In another project, HumorRestaurant, the guest can earn a meal in exchange for a comic performance. With these actions, the artist counters the monopoly of money in response to the financial crisis.

Kim also uses drawing and video as media with which to realise his ideas. Subtle philosophical reflections inhabit these works, such as the cycle Der kleine Künstler (the little artist, cf. list of works in public collections) that use sophisticated humour to address the viewer. The main themes of his works are happiness (cf. list of works in public collections) and the cycle of life, death and existence. Traditional Buddhist themes often mix with Western influences, reflecting Kim's transcultural approach and practice.

Kim has realised his performance projects in Germany, Switzerland, France, the United States and Africa. His storyboards, drawings and videos have been exhibited at the Kunstverein Zurich, Wiensowski & Harbord in Berlin, as well as the Richmond Art Center in Richmond, California.

== Collections ==
- "Der Stein", 150 cm x 220 cm, Graphit auf Papier, 2013, Villa Merkel, Galerie der Stadt Esslingen
- "Das Glück", 150 cm x 200 cm, Graphit auf Papier, 2014, Villa Merkel, Galerie der Stadt Esslingen
- „Performance Express“, 80 x 60 cm, „Everybody Happy Company“, 80 x 60 cm, 2011, Kunstmuseum Stuttgart
- „Performance Hotel“, 5 Fotos, Video, ca. 30 min und Objekt, 2010, Kunstmuseum Stuttgart
- „Der kleine Künstler“, Video und Zeichnung, 28 min, 2007, Kunsthalle Göppingen

== Literature ==
- Von Oma bis Nietzsche: Byung Chul Kim. Arbeiten 2013–14. Staatliche Akademie der Bildenden Künste, Stuttgart 2014, ISBN 978-3-942144-33-9.
- Offspaces. Zur Entwicklung selbstorganisierter Räume in Stuttgart. In: Dietrich Heissenbüttel (Hrsg.): Kunst in Stuttgart. Hampp Media Verlag, 2013, ISBN 978-3-942561-19-8, S. 108 ff.
- Johan Holten (Hrsg.): Room Service – Vom Hotel in der Kunst und Künstlern im Hotel. Verlag der Buchhandlung Walther König, Köln 2014, ISBN 978-3-86335-576-0.
