= Philipp Jakob Scheffauer =

German Neoclassical sculptor

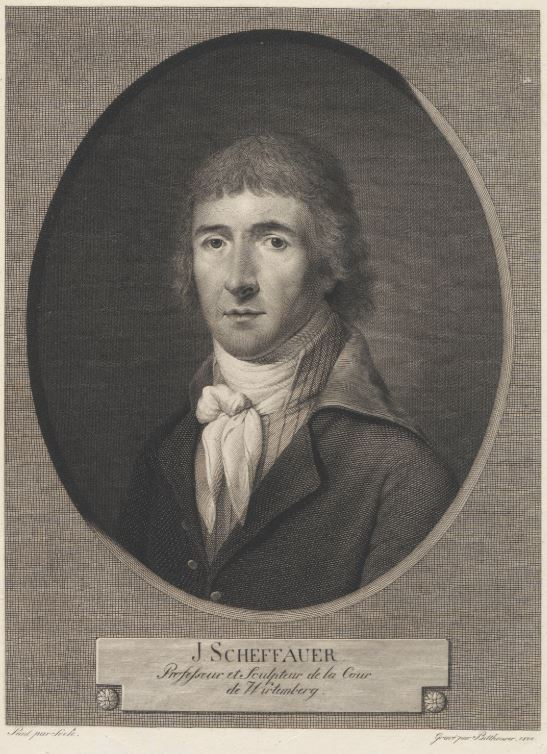
Philipp Jakob Scheffauer; by Johann Baptist Seele (1808)

Philipp Jakob von Scheffauer (7 May 1756, Stuttgart - 13 November 1808, Stuttgart) was a German Neoclassical sculptor.

== Life and work ==
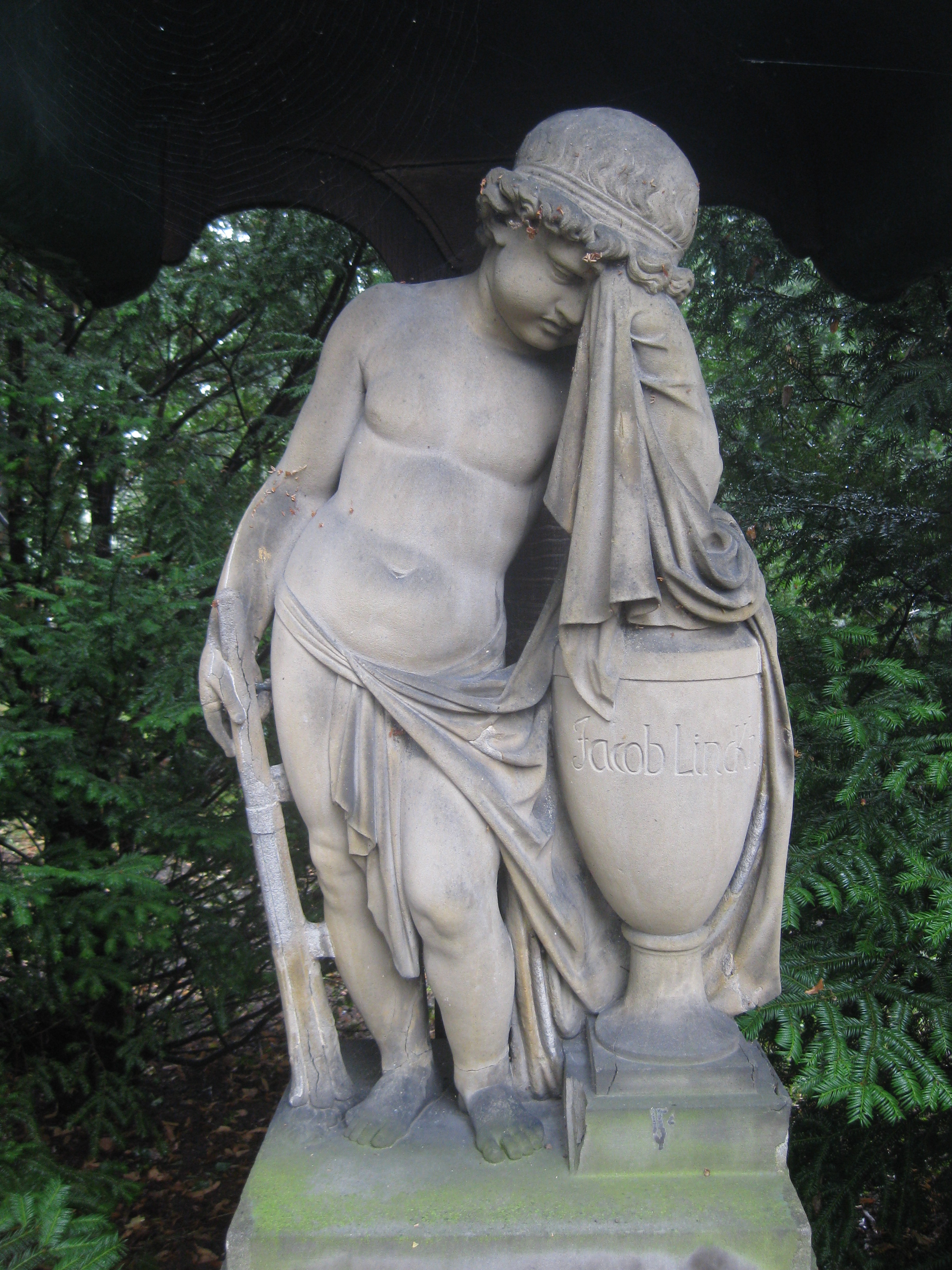
The Crying Genius

His father was a manservant to Charles Eugene, Duke of Württemberg. In 1780, after studying at the Hohe Karlsschule, he and his fellow student, Johann Heinrich von Dannecker, were appointed Court Sculptors. Three years later, they were both sent to Paris and Rome for further studies; returning to Stuttgart in 1789. The following year, he and Dannecker became Professors at the Karlsschule, where they both remained until its closure in 1794.

During this time, he was also awarded the Order of the Württemberg Crown, which entitled him to use the noble "von". In 1790, he married Caroline Heigelin, better known as "Caroline H.", the subject of one of the first clinical descriptions of a "split-personality".

His health was always rather poor, and he died after a long illness, possibly from tuberculosis. He is interred at the Hoppenlaufriedhof in Stuttgart, in a tomb designed by his friend, Antonio Isopi.

His "Crying Genius" is installed at the Stuttgart Steigfriedhof. The tomb of Friedrich Gottlieb Klopstock, at the Christianskirche (Ottensen), is adorned with one of his reliefs; an allegorical depiction of grief.

The rotunda of the Kepler Monument in Regensburg once held his bust of Johannes Kepler. It has since been moved to the entryway of the Kepler Memorial House and replaced by a replica.

The Denkmal der Gattenzärtlichkeit und Volksliebe (Monument to the tenderness of the spouse and the love of the people), which was built in 1796 to celebrate the recovery of Frederick II Eugene, Duke of Württemberg from a serious illness, contained four large reliefs by Scheffauer. It was destroyed in 1817, when the square where it was displayed was redesigned.

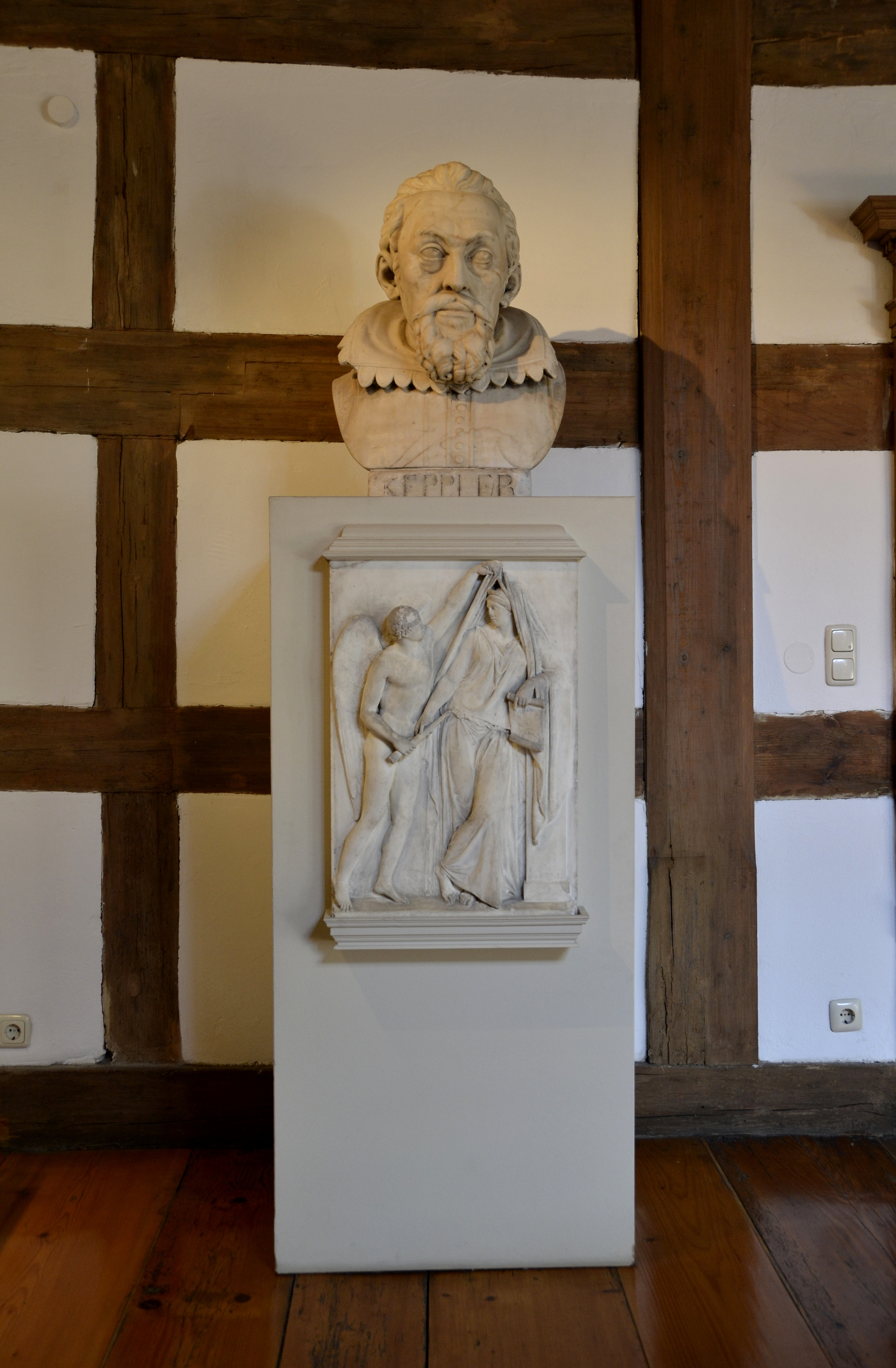
Johannes Kepler (relief by Johann Heinrich von Dannecker)
