= Heinrich von Rustige =

German painter

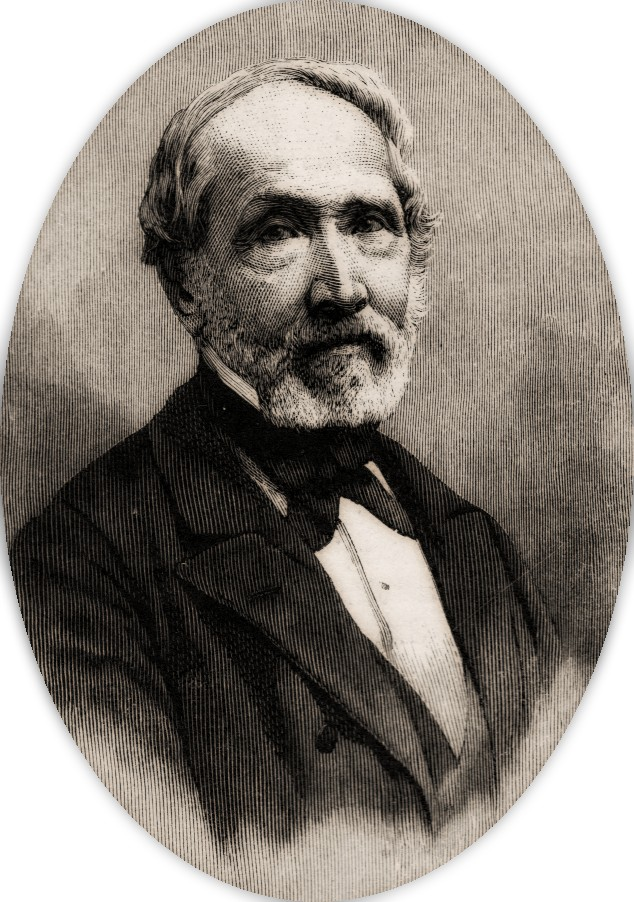
Heinrich von Rustige (1889)

Heinrich Franz Gaudenz von Rustige (12 April 1810 – 15 January 1900) was a German painter specializing in historical subjects and genre scenes.

== Life and work ==
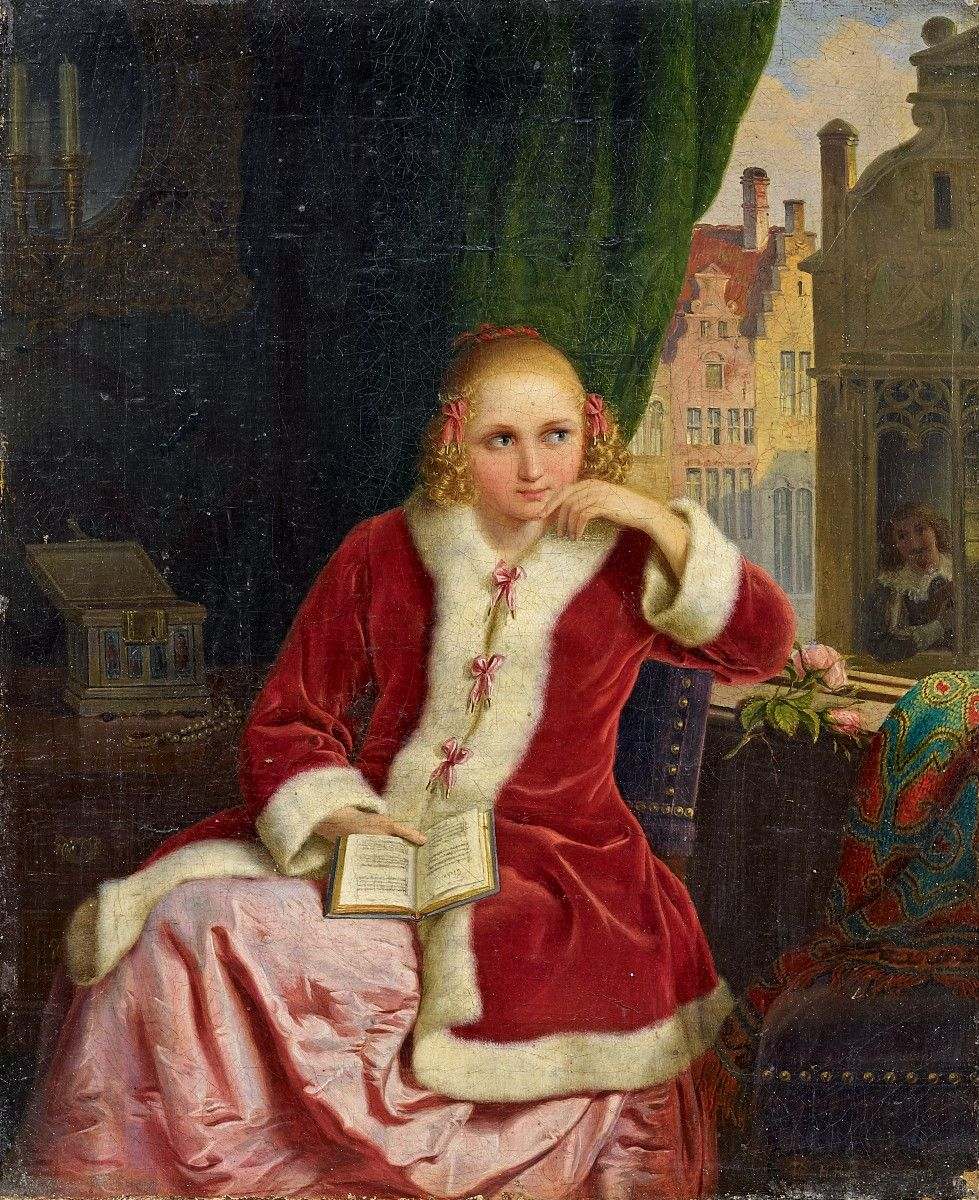
The Romance (1843)

From 1828, he was a student of Wilhelm von Schadow at the Kunstakademie Düsseldorf. After 1832, he began participating in exhibitions there.

In 1836, he settled in Frankfurt am Main and made that his base for student trips to Vienna, Dresden, Berlin, France and England. Beginning in 1845, he taught at the Staatliche Akademie der Bildenden Künste Stuttgart, where he also served as "Inspector" of the art gallery and the engraving collections.

From 1865 to 1866 he had his won house built; designed by the architect, Christian Friedrich von Leins. It was demolished in 1951. The relief sculptures of the "Four Seasons", by Bertel Thorvaldsen, which adorned the house, may now be seen at the Städtisches Lapidarium Stuttgart. He gave up his teaching post in 1887, but continued as the gallery Director until 1897.

He was awarded the Knight's Cross, First Class of the Order of the Crown (Württemberg), which conferred a title of nobility. In 1890, he was made an Honorary Citizen of Werl.

His works cover a wide range of subject matter, including historical scenes, genre scenes, landscapes and portraits. His paintings may be seen at the National Gallery (Berlin), the Städtisches Museum Am Rykenberg and the Museum Kunstpalast.

=== Poetry ===
Rustige is also known as a poet. A volume of lyrical poems in 1845 was followed by the historical verse dramas "Filippo Lippi" (1851), "Attila" (1853), "Konrad Widerhold" (1856) and "Eberhard im Bart" (1863). "Kaiser Ludwig, der Baier" (1860) has been reprinted by the Nabu Press (2012). He wrote a popular military song, "Deutscher Marsch", set to music by Friedrich Wilhelm Kücken.

== Major works ==
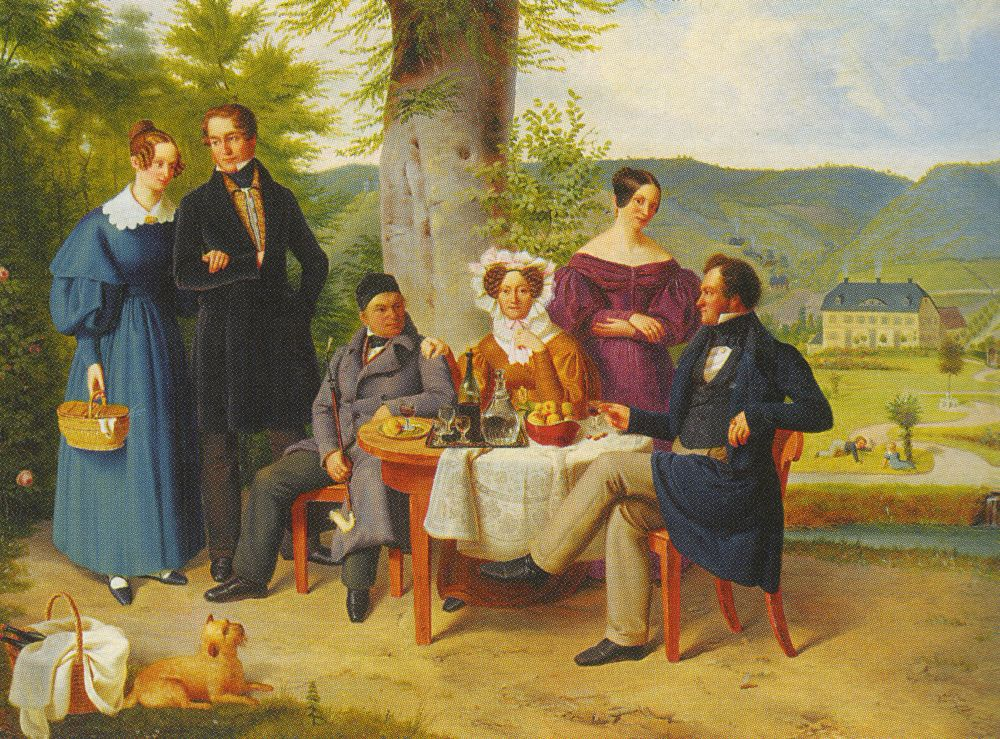
The "Eau-de-Cologne Family" Farina in Front of their Hagerhof estate near Bad Honnef (1837)

- Die Überschwemmung (The Flood, National Gallery, Berlin)
- Herzog Alba im Schloss zu Rudolstadt (The Duke of Alva in the Castle of Rudolstadt, Galerie zu Stuttgart)
- Überführung der Leiche Kaiser Ottos III nach Deutschland (The Transfer of Emperor Otto III's Body to Germany, Municipal Museum Werl)
- Friedrich II und sein Hof in Palermo (Frederick II and his Court in Palermo, Municipal Museum Werl)

== Sources ==
- Gisela Hengstenberg: Rübezahl im Königsbau. Die Stuttgarter Künstlergesellschaft „Das Strahlende Bergwerk“, Stuttgart 2003.
- Ingeborg Krekler: Katalog der handschriftlichen Theaterbücher des ehemaligen württembergischen Hoftheaters : (codices theatrales) , Wiesbaden 1979, S. 47, 205 und 335 (Digitalisat)
- Manfred Schmid; Jutta Ronke: Städtisches Lapidarium, Museumsführer, Stuttgart 2006.
- Stuttgart, in: Deutsches Kunstblatt. Zeitschrift für bildende Kunst, Baukunst und Kunstgewerbe 2.1851, Nr. 43 vom 25. Oktober, S. 348 (Digitalisat)
- Gustav Wais: Stuttgarts Kunst- und Kulturdenkmale : 25 Bilder mit stadtgeschichtlichen, baugeschichtlichen und kunstgeschichtlichen Erläuterungen, Stuttgart [1954].
