= Gustav Paul Closs =

German painter

Gustav Paul Closs (1840–1870) was a German landscape painter.

== Life ==
Closs was born at Stuttgart in 1840, and received his first instructions in the State Academy of Fine Arts Stuttgart, under Heinrich Funk; but afterwards studied in Rome, Naples, Munich, Paris, and other places. He also made a number of student-tours, especially to the Chiem-See in Bavaria, on the borders of which he died in 1870 at Prien. He produced a number of Italian views, and also published Illustrations to Wieland's Oberon, a volume entitled Truth and Fiction, and Uhland and his Home at Tübingen, the plates in which show the influence of Doré.

== Works ==
His paintings included:

- The Villa of Hadrian
- Road near Sorrento
- The Campagna near Borne
- Evening in the Villa Pamfili
- Cypresses in Tivoli
- Christmas Eve
- The Lonely Inn
- Autumn Night in the Park
