= Hannes Neuner =

German painter

- Born: 27 August 1906; Aschaffenburg, Germany
- Died: 25 April 1978 (aged 71); Stuttgart, Germany
- Occupation: Painter

Hannes Neuner (27 August 1906 – 25 April 1978) was a German painter. His work was part of the painting event in the art competition at the 1936 Summer Olympics.
