= Reinhard von Koenig-Fachsenfeld =

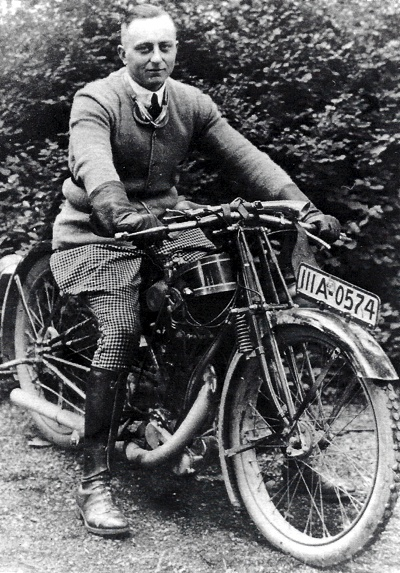
Reinhard von Koenig-Fachsenfeld (1930s)

Reinhard Freiherr von Koenig-Fachsenfeld (19 March 1899, Stuttgart - 9 March 1992, Fachsenfeld) was a German engineer, inventor and racer of automobiles and motorcycles.

== Biography ==
His father was the nobleman Freiherr Franz von Koenig-Fachsenfeld (1866-1918), a diplomat and art collector. After completing his primary education, he studied at the University of Stuttgart.

In 1924, he was the first person, riding a Cotton motorcycle, in the 250 cc class to win the Deutsche Motorrad-Straßenmeisterschaft (motorcycle road championship). The following year, he won the Solituderennen, and broke several speed records. This motivated him to study vehicular aerodynamics.

In the late 1920s, he became the first person in Germany to file fundamental patents on the subject, with improvements based on the work of the Austrian engineer, Paul Jaray who had filed patents in 1922. At the beginning of the 1930s, he began to move away from Jaray's work, into independent research, conducted in cooperation with the Research Institute for Automotive Engineering and Vehicle Engines (FKFS). As part of his work, he designed several test vehicles that broke speed records. He also designed streamlined bodies for sedans, that were used by several major manufacturers.

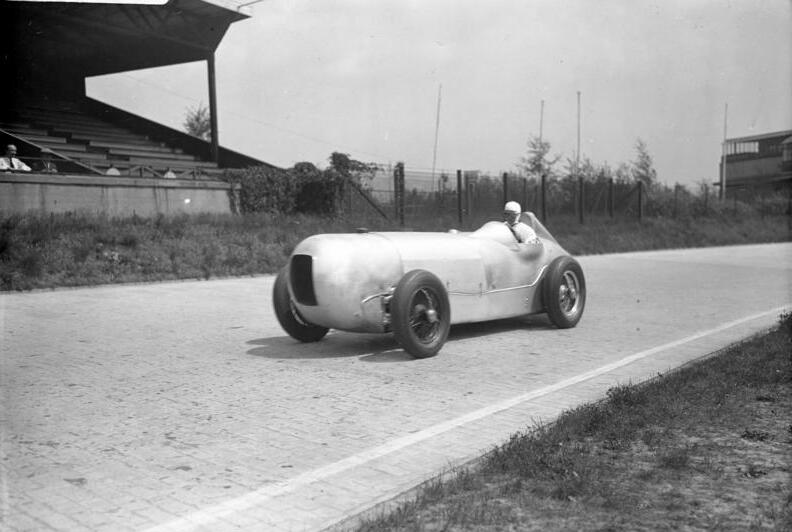
Manfred von Brauchitsch in the 1932 Mercedes-Benz SSKL streamlined racing car at the Berlin AVUS

His greatest success was the aerodynamically designed Mercedes-Benz SSKL, a two-seater racing version of the SSK, which was produced by Walter Vetter Karosserie- und Fahrzeugbau (body and vehicle construction) in Bad Cannstatt. With this vehicle, Manfred von Brauchitsch won a race on the AVUS track in Berlin in 1932. Under his direction, a streamlined car, based on the Maybach-Motorenbau SW 38, was created; commissioned by the tire manufacturer, Fulda Reifen. It was used by them for testing tires, and reached a top speed of 200km (roughly 124 miles) per hour. It disappeared during World War II.

In 1982, he created the Schloss Fachsenfeld Foundation, to preserve his father's castle and provide for public access. The castle features an exhibit on vehicular aerodynamics, as well as an extensive art collection, featuring works by Hermann Pleuer and Otto Reiniger. The Foundation also awards a prize "for new technological solutions that meet pressing social challenges, display engineering courage, or make a significant contribution to sustainable scientific and technological progress", presented every two years.

== Sources ==
- Reinhard von Koenig-Fachsenfeld. @ Deutsche-Biographie
- Statut – Reinhard von Koenig Preis für Technik und Fortschritt. @ Stiftung Schloss Fachsenfeld
- Der „silberne Pfeil“ – Mercedes-Benz SSKL Stromlinienrennwagen. @ Die-Testfahrer
- Martin Schröder: Die Renaissance des Langhecks. @ Zwischengas
