= Bernhard Buttersack =

German painter

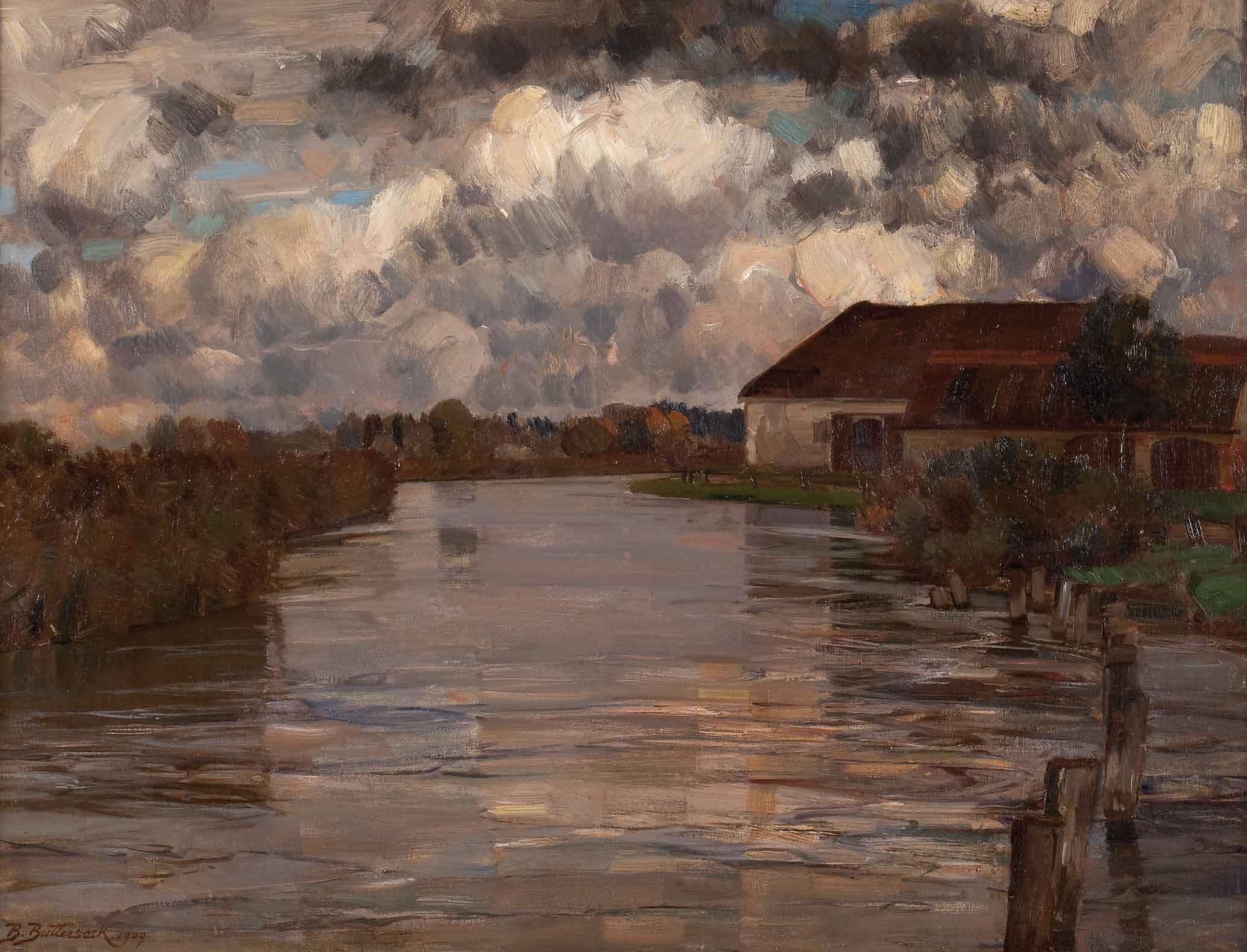
Spring on the Amper (1909)

Bernhard Buttersack (16 March 1858 – 6 May 1925) was a German landscape painter of the Munich School.

== Life and work ==
He was born in Bad Liebenzell. He displayed artistic talent at an early age, was encouraged by his parents and began his studies at the Royal Art School in Stuttgart under Jakob Grünenwald and Albert Kappis. Upon completing his course there, he became a master pupil of Hermann Baisch and Gustav Schönleber in Karlsruhe. He worked in Munich from 1884 to 1889 and was soon appointed a Royal Professor by the Prince Regent Luitpold. In 1891, he was awarded a gold medal at the Glaspalast and, the following year, was one of the founders of the Munich Secession.

Towards the end of 1889, he moved to Dachau County, inspired by the dramatic landscapes there. Four years later, after several moves, he settled in Haimhausen, where he built a spacious house with a large art studio and landscaped garden. He soon opened a private art school and began what became the Haimhausen Art Colony.

In his later years, however, he suffered from an unspecified "nervous ailment", which was difficult to define. The joy he felt for the local surroundings gradually diminished and he complained about the frequent easterly winds which, he said, ruined the picturesque atmosphere. In 1914, he moved to Icking and became a recluse. He died in 1925 in Icking.
