= University of Stuttgart =

Public university in Stuttgart, Germany

- Universität Stuttgart
- Former name: Technische Hochschule Stuttgart
- Motto: Der Stuttgarter Weg
- Motto in English: The Stuttgart way.
- Type: Public
- Established: 1829; 197 years ago
- Founder: William I of Württemberg
- Affiliations: German Universities Excellence Initiative, CESAER, PEGASUS, TU9, EUA, TIME, DFH
- Budget: EUR 662 million
- Chancellor: Anna Steiger
- President: Peter Middendorf
- Faculty: 3,152
- Administrative staff: 1,794
- Students: 19,097
- Undergraduates: 13,136
- Postgraduates: 7,309
- Doctoral students: 1,682
- Location: Stuttgart, Baden-Württemberg, Germany; 48°46′54″N 9°10′31″E
- Campus: Urban/Suburban
Colors
Anthracite, Dark Blue ("Mittelblau") & Light Blue
- Nickname: UST
- Website: www.uni-stuttgart.de

- Location within Germany Location within Baden-Württemberg

The University of Stuttgart (German: Universität Stuttgart) is a public research university located in Stuttgart, Germany. It was founded in 1829 and is organized into 10 faculties. It is one of the oldest technical universities in Germany with programs in civil, mechanical, industrial and electrical engineering, among others. It is a member of TU9, an incorporated society of the nine oldest German institutes of technology.

== History ==
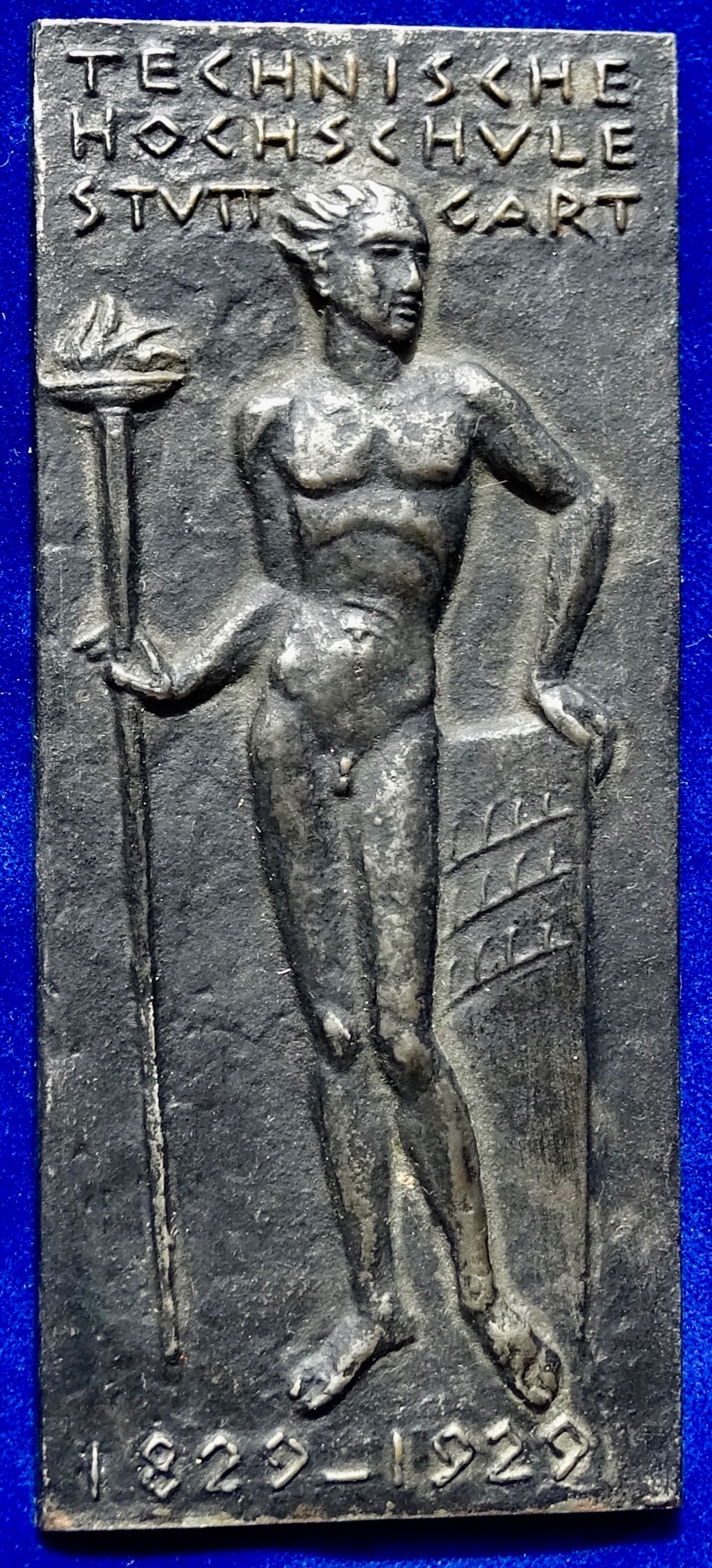
Technische Hochschule Stuttgart 1929, art deco cast iron plaque medal to the 100th anniversary

From 1770 to 1794, the Karlsschule was the first university in Stuttgart. The University of Hohenheim in Stuttgart-Hohenheim, founded in 1818 and Stuttgart's oldest still existing university, is not related to the University of Stuttgart, except for some joint activities.

What is now the University of Stuttgart was founded in 1829, and celebrated its 175th anniversary in 2004. Because of the increasing importance of the technical sciences and instruction in these fields, from 1876 the university was known as the Technische Hochschule Stuttgart (Stuttgart Institute of Technology). In 1900 it was awarded the right to grant doctoral degrees in the technical disciplines. The development of the courses of study at the Technische Hochschule Stuttgart led to its renaming in 1967 to the present-day "Universität Stuttgart". With this change of name came along a built-up of new fields, such as history of science and technology and the social sciences, and the extension of existing ones, such as history and art history.

Since the end of the 1950s, a part of the university has been located in the suburb of Stuttgart-Vaihingen. Most technical subjects (computer science, engineering, etc.) are located in Vaihingen, while the humanities, the social sciences, architecture, and similar topics are still located in the city center campus. The university hosts many national and international research institutes, and collaborates with partners such as Fraunhofer, German Aerospace Center, among others. The university is also founding member of the Startup Autobahn as well as Arena2036, the flexible research factory.

== Organization ==
The university is divided into 10 faculties:

- Faculty of Architecture and Urban Planning
- Faculty of Civil- and Environmental Engineering
- Faculty of Chemistry
- Faculty of Energy-, Process- and Bio-Engineering
- Faculty of Computer Science, Electrical Engineering and Information Technology
- Faculty of Aerospace Engineering and Geodesy
- Faculty of Engineering Design, Production Engineering and Automotive Engineering
- Faculty of Mathematics and Physics
- Faculty of Humanities
- Faculty of Management, Economics and Social Sciences
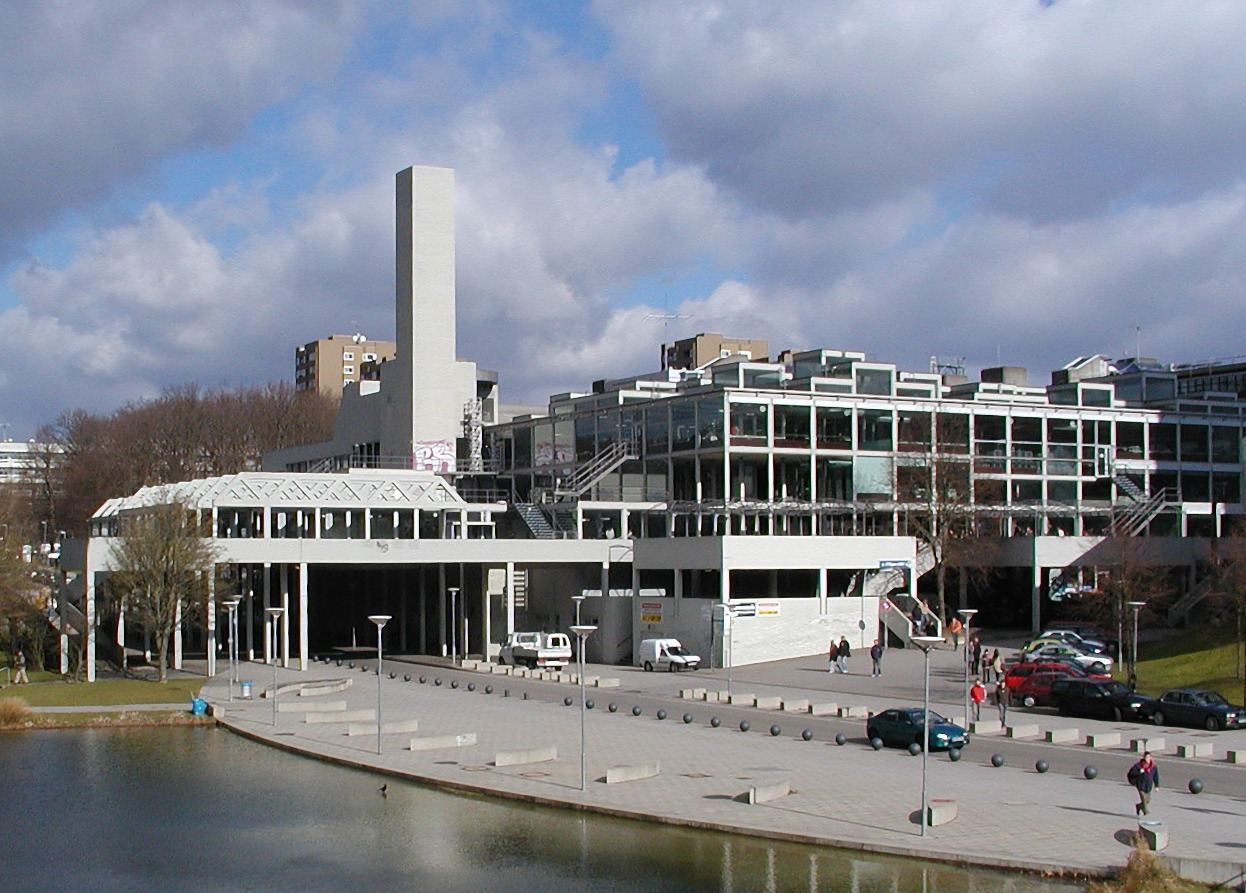
Mensa building at the main campus

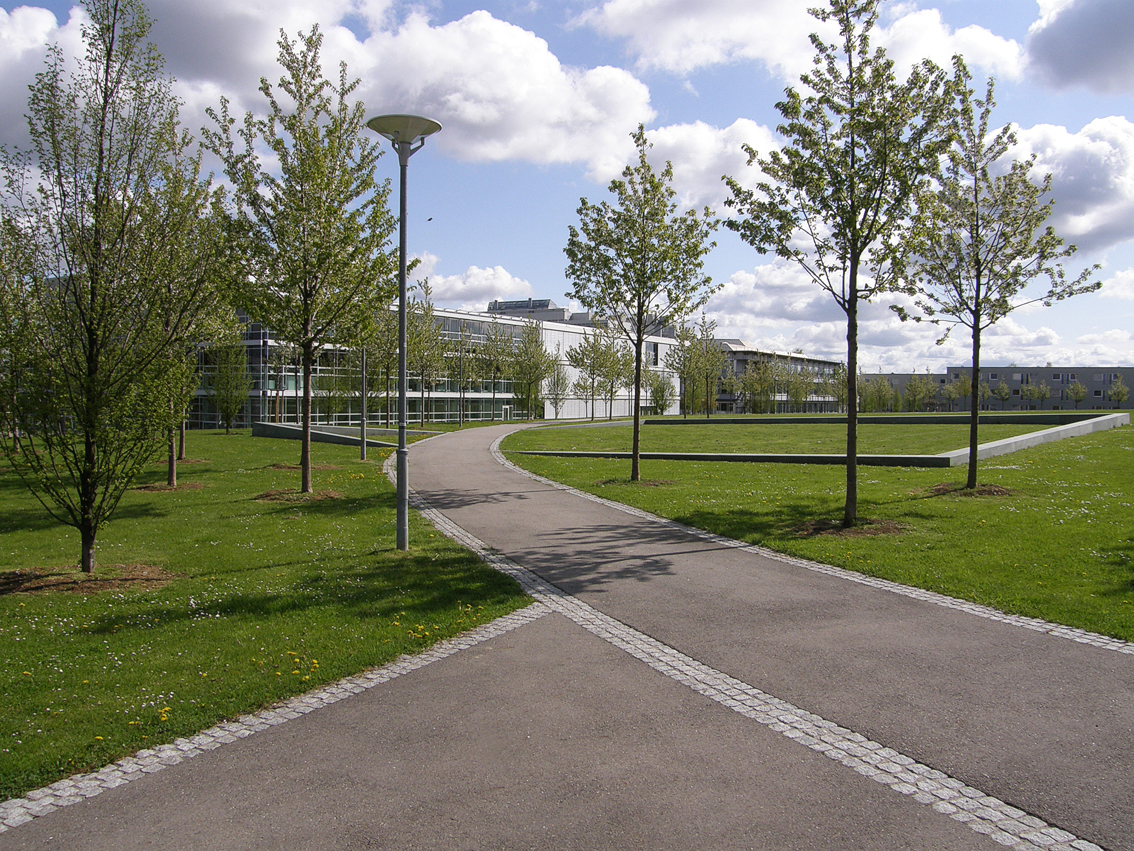
Campus at Vaihingen

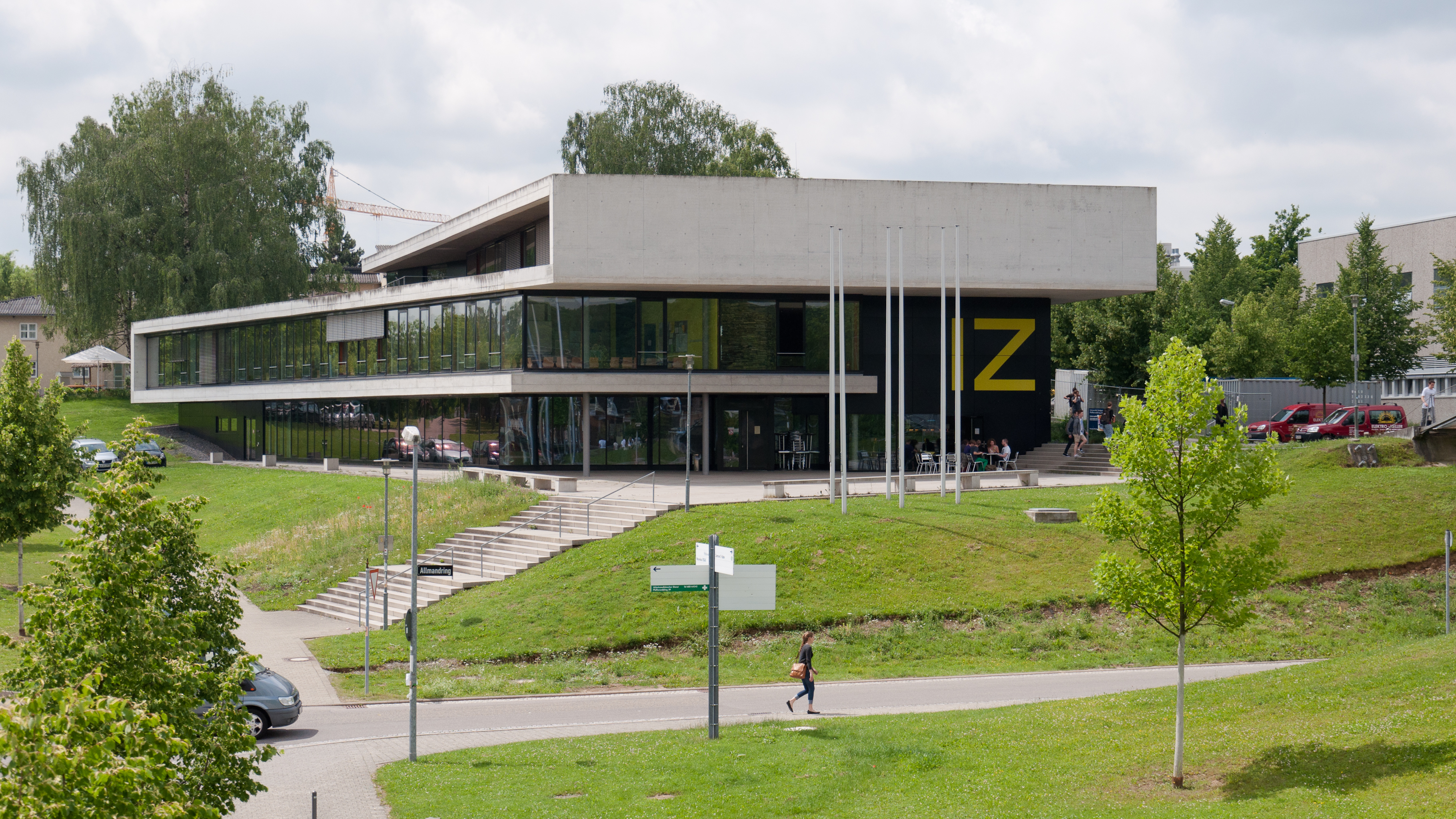
International Centrum at the University of Stuttgart

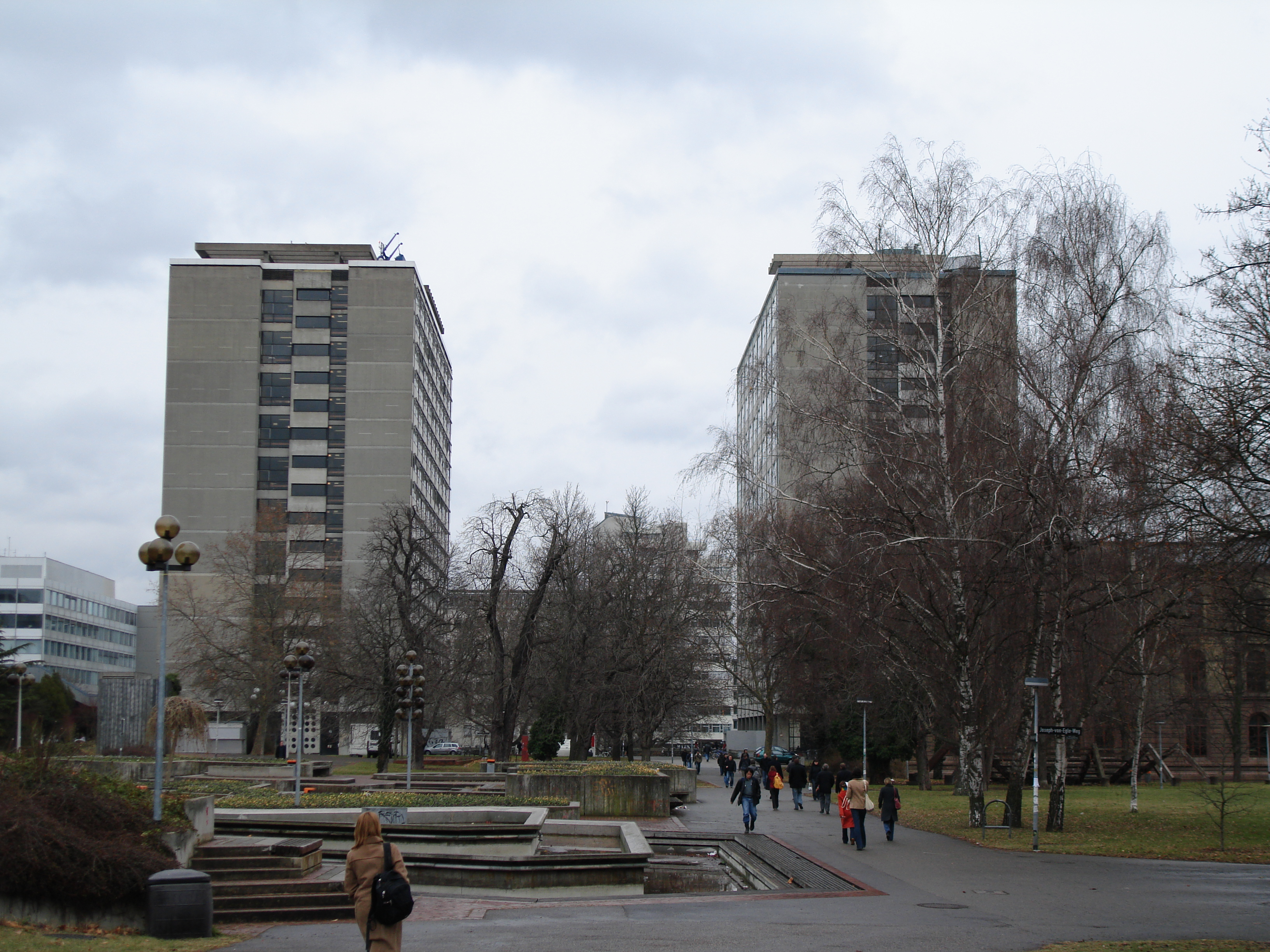
Keplerstraße 11 ("K1", right) and 17 ("K2", left) in the city center

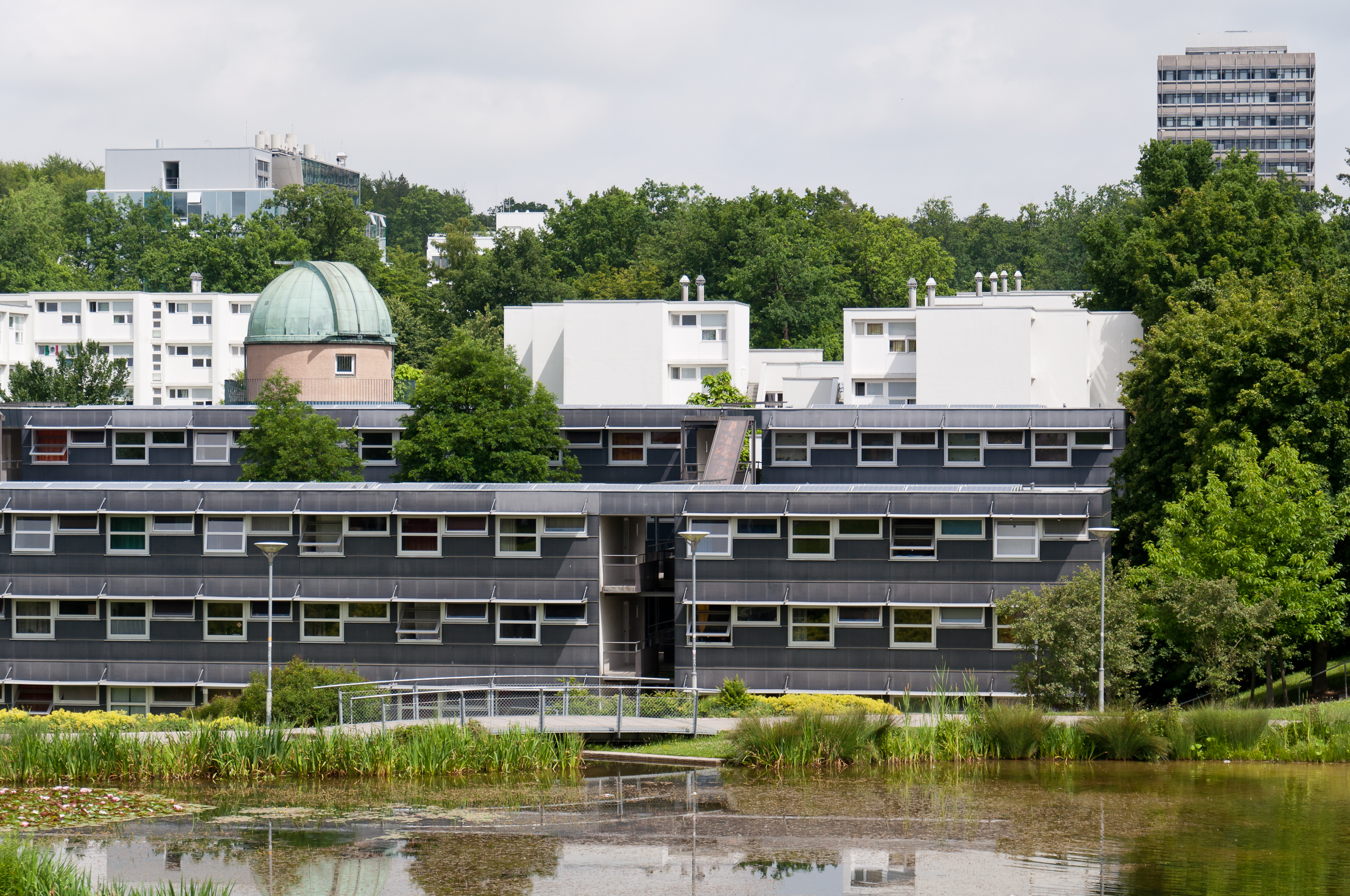
Student Hall Pfaffenhof II

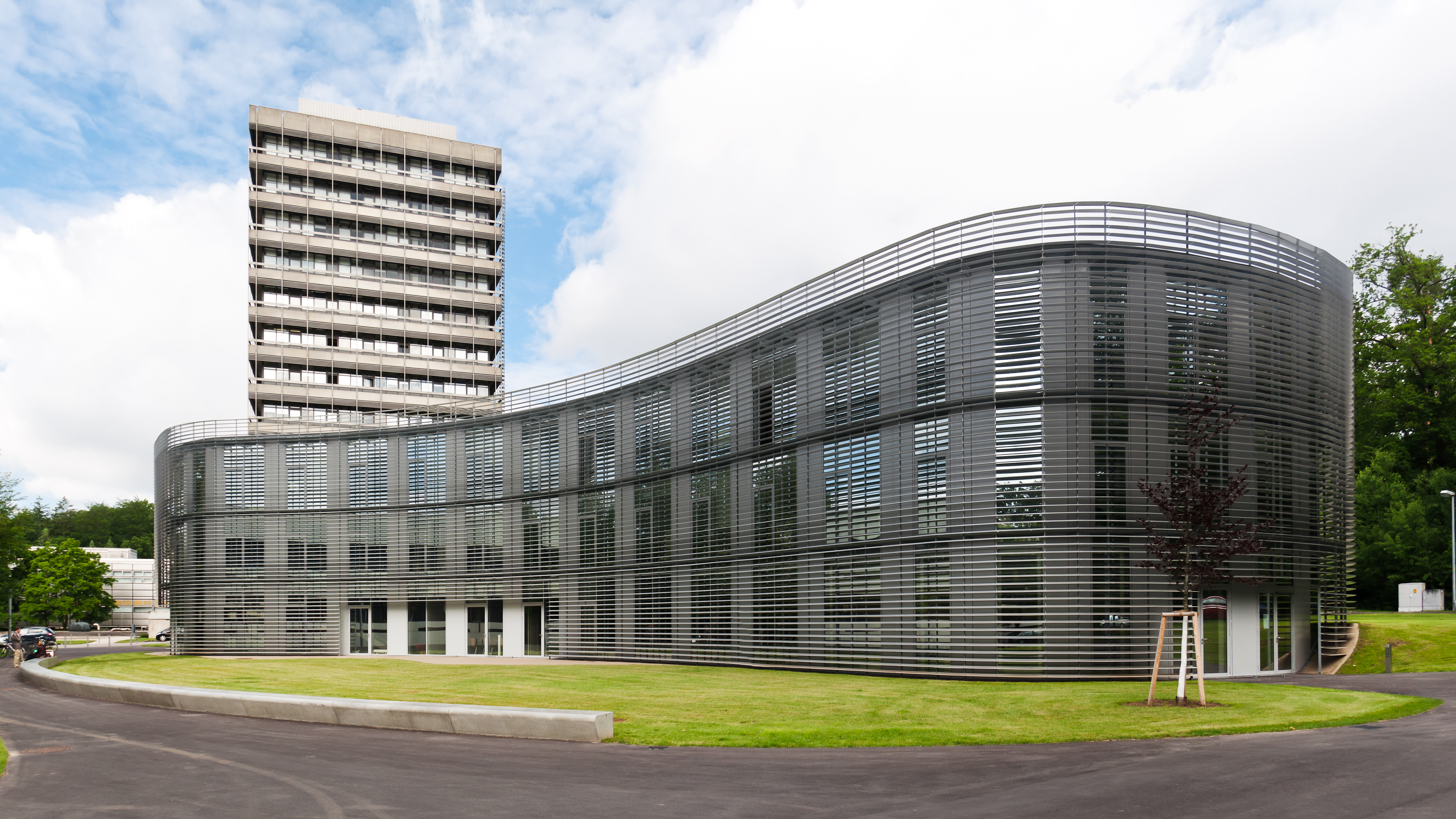
The new "Raumfahrtzentrum Baden-Württemberg" in Vaihingen

== Ranking and reputation ==
University rankings

Overall – Global & National
| QS World 2026 | 310 | 18 |
| THE World 2024 | 251-300 | 25-31 |
| ARWU World 2023 | 301-400 | 20-24 |

By subject – Global & National
| QS Engineering and Technology 2023 | 167 | 6 |
| THE Engineering 2023 | 101-125 | 5-7 |

The University of Stuttgart is globally and nationally recognized in several prominent university rankings. According to the QS World University Rankings of 2024, it was ranked 312th worldwide and 19th within Germany. As for the Times Higher Education World University Rankings, in 2024, the institution landed within the 251-300 band globally and was situated between the 25th and 31st positions nationally. The Academic Ranking of World Universities, also known as ARWU, positioned the University of Stuttgart between the 301-400 range globally and between 20th and 24th in the national ranking for the year 2023.

In the field of Engineering and Technology, the university was ranked 167th worldwide and 6th within Germany according to the 2023 QS World University Rankings. In the same year, the Times Higher Education World University Rankings for Engineering positioned the institution within the 101-125 range globally, and between the 5th and 7th spots nationally.

== Notable alumni ==
- Gustav Bauernfeind, painter, illustrator and architect
- Volker Beck
- Günter Behnisch, architect
- Gunnar Birkerts, architect
- Kim Bui, Artistic gymnast, member of 2012, 2016, and 2020 German Olympic teams
- Gottlieb Daimler, engineer: The Inventor of "The Automobile" and co-founder (together with Carl Benz) of Mercedes-Benz
- Vera Demberg, computational linguist and professor of computer science and computational linguistics
- Gerhard Ertl, Nobel Prize Laureate in Chemistry in 2007
- Hartmut Esslinger, Industry Designer, Apple Macintosh, Lufthansa, Windows XP, SAP Designer
- Max Eyth
- Gego
- Rudolf Haag, physicist
- Ernst Heinkel
- Rolf-Dieter Heuer
- Martin Jetter, CEO of IBM Deutschland GmbH and IBM Japan, Ltd.
- Wunibald Kamm
- Heinz-Hermann Koelle
- Berthold Leibinger
- Fritz Leonhardt
- Michael Macht, former CEO of Porsche AG
- Wilhelm Maybach, engineer and automobile designer
- Ulf Merbold
- Eugen Baumann, chemist
- Frieder Nake
- Achilles Papapetrou
- Karl Ramsayer, geodesist, pioneer of global and German flight navigation
- Ulrich Spiesshofer, former CEO of ABB Group
- Horst Störmer, physicist, Nobel prize winner
- Fredrick Töben
- Martin Winterkorn, former CEO of Volkswagen AG
- Franz Xaver Wortmann, aerodynamicist and professor
- Yajin Zhang, architect, general director at the Beijing Branch of ISA Internationales Stadtbauatelier
- Otto Roelen, chemist, inventor of Oxo process

== See also ==
- List of early modern universities in Europe
- Top Industrial Managers for Europe
- Forschungsinstitut für Kraftfahrwesen und Fahrzeugmotoren Stuttgart
