= Otto Reiniger =

German painter

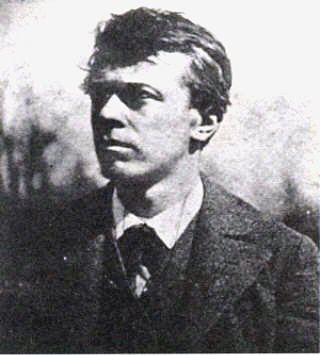
Otto Reiniger (1886)

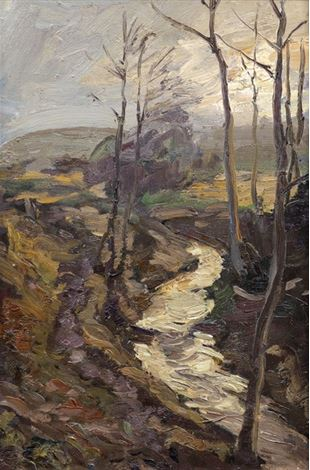
The Feuerbach in Autumn

Otto Reiniger (27 February 1863, Stuttgart – 24 July 1909, near Weilimdorf, now part of Stuttgart) was a German landscape painter in the Impressionistic style. Most of his works feature the area immediately surrounding Stuttgart, and he was particularly praised for his depictions of flowing water.

== Biography ==
He began his studies at the State Academy of Fine Arts Stuttgart, where he worked with Jakob Grünenwald and Albert Kappis. In 1883, he transferred to the Academy of Fine Arts Munich for lessons with Joseph Wenglein. He also married Marie Schraudolph (1867–1951), daughter of Professor Claudius Schraudolph. Later that same year, they went to stay in Olevano Romano for several months. The following year, he took more study trips to Italy.

In 1888, he and Marie returned to Stuttgart and he set up a studio there. Much of his success was the result of promotion by his patron, Franz Freiherr von Koenig-Fachsenfeld (1866–1918). He was named a Professor in 1900, but was never given a teaching assignment.

In 1904, tragedy struck when most of his accumulated works were destroyed in a fire. Two years later, he and Marie moved into an estate on the Tachensee, near Weilimdorf, which is now part of Stuttgart. For the last six years of his life, he was a member of the Deutscher Künstlerbund.

Streets in Stuttgart and Ostfildern have been named after him. His works may be seen at the Kunstmuseum Stuttgart and the Heimatmuseum in Korntal-Münchingen, among others. In 2009, to mark the centenary of his death, a major exhibition was held at Schloss Fachsenfeld near Aalen.
