= Georg Jauss =

German painter

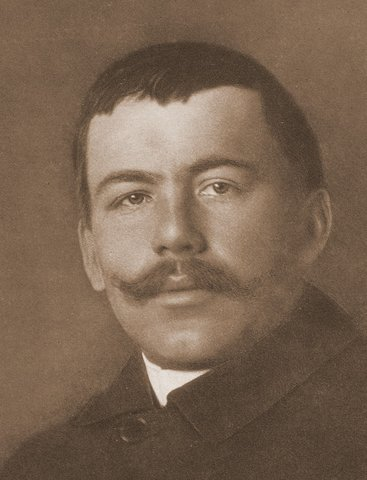
Georg Jauss in 1898

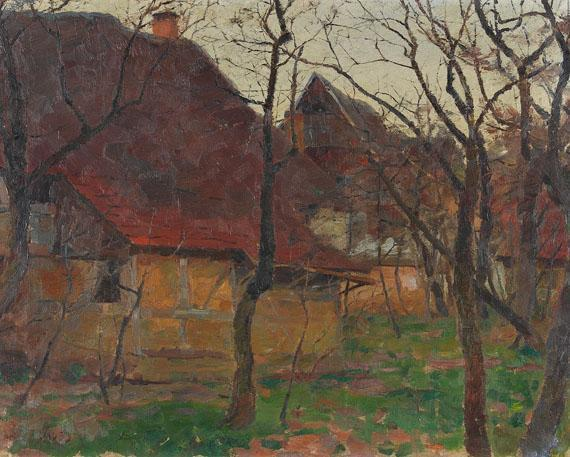
Truss-work Houses Behind Trees (c.1900)

Georg Jauss (15 March 1867, in Hattenhofen – 6 March 1922, in Munich) was a German landscape painter who worked in Bavaria.

== Life ==
Jauss was the eldest of six children born to Anna Maria and Leonhard Jauss (a mason and farmer). From 1873 to 1880, he attended the elementary school in Hattenhofen, where the Pastor discovered that he had talent for drawing and arranged for him to take lessons at Göppingen. In 1883, he became a fellow at the Academy of Fine Arts and Design in Stuttgart. Jakob Grünenwald was one of his instructors; his fellow students included Christian Landenberger and Bernhard Buttersack.

He took a study trip to Italy in the summer of 1890 and, after his military service, went to the Dachau District where his interests changed from genre painting to landscapes. In 1895, he became a teacher at the Munich Association of Women Artists and joined the Munich Secession but, only four years later, resigned Association and disassociated himself from the Secession. From 1906 to 1913, he was a member of the Luitpold Group, an association of slightly modernist tendencies that promoted high-quality art, then he returned to the Secession.

He was married twice and had two children. In 1919, he became a naturalized citizen of Bavaria. He died of a stroke and is buried in the Old North Cemetery, Munich.

== Sources and further reading ==
- Jauss, J. und Dr. Best, B.: Georg Jauss 1867-1922, Landschaftsmaler der Jahrhundertwende in Bayern. Dachau 2010, ISBN 978-3-926355-18-8
- Thieme, Becker: Künstlerlexikon (Allgemeines Lexikon der bildenden Künstler), Verlag W. Engelmann, 1907-1947, Leipzig
- Nagel G.K.: Schwäbisches Künstlerlexikon. K & A, Stuttgart 1986
- Thiemann, C.: Erinnerungen eines Dachauer Malers, Dachau 1967
- Reitmeier, L.J.: Dachau, ein Kunstbilderbuch. Dachau 1995
- Walter E.: Hattenhofer Bilderbogen. Gemeindeverwaltung Hattenhofen, 1984
- Frei, W.: "Malerisches Erbe zwischen Isar und Loisach", Hirmer, 2018
