= Yajin Zhang =

Chinese architect and urban planner

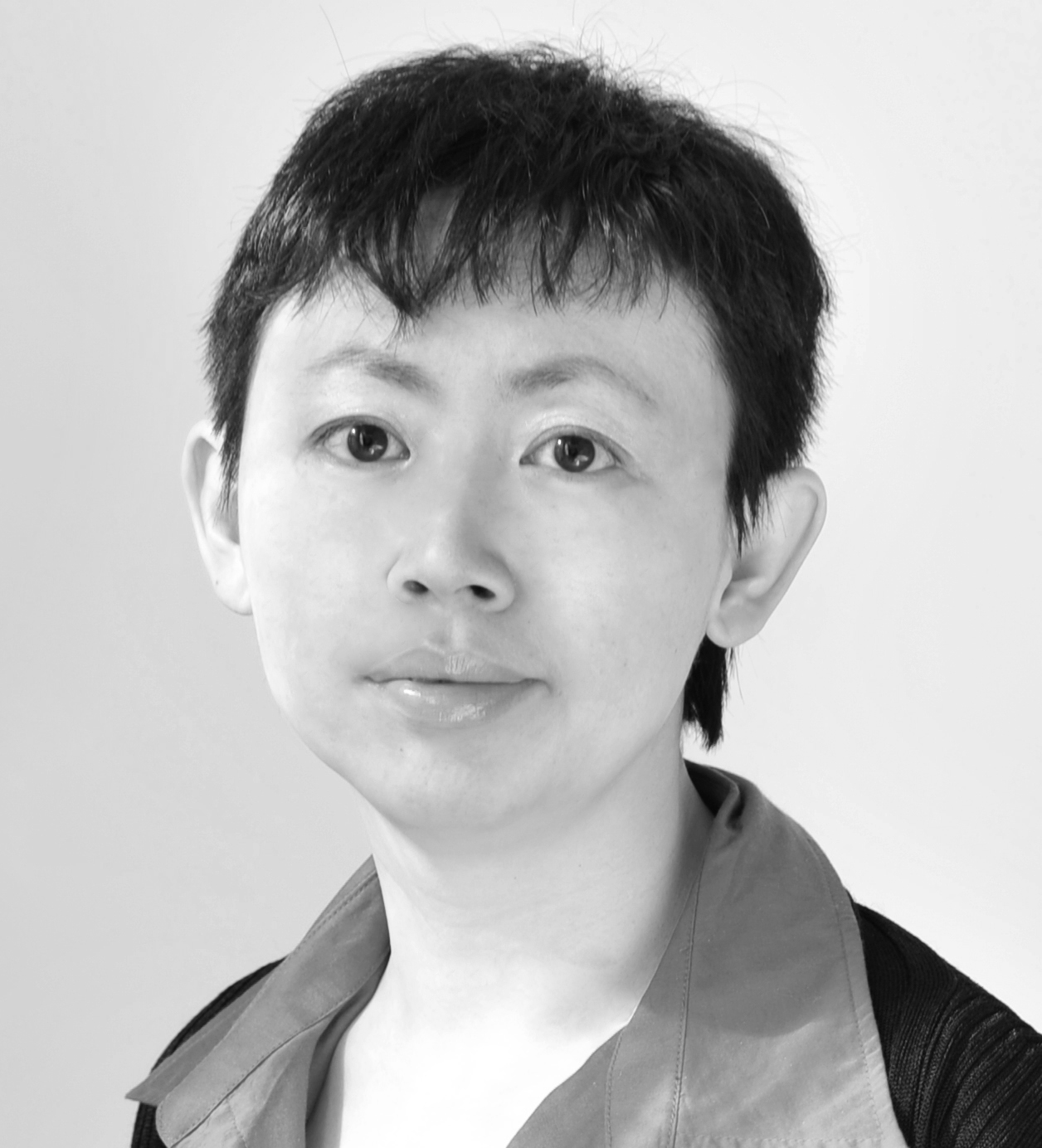
- Born: 1974 (age 51–52); Shanxi, China
- Education: Tsinghua University; University of Stuttgart
- Occupation: Architect

Zhang Yajin (born in Shanxi in 1974) is a Chinese architect and urban planner. She is one of the four partners of ISA Internationales Stadtbauatelier and its general director at the Beijing headquarters. She also works as a correspondent for the Chinese magazine Community Design.
