= Albert Kappis =

German painter

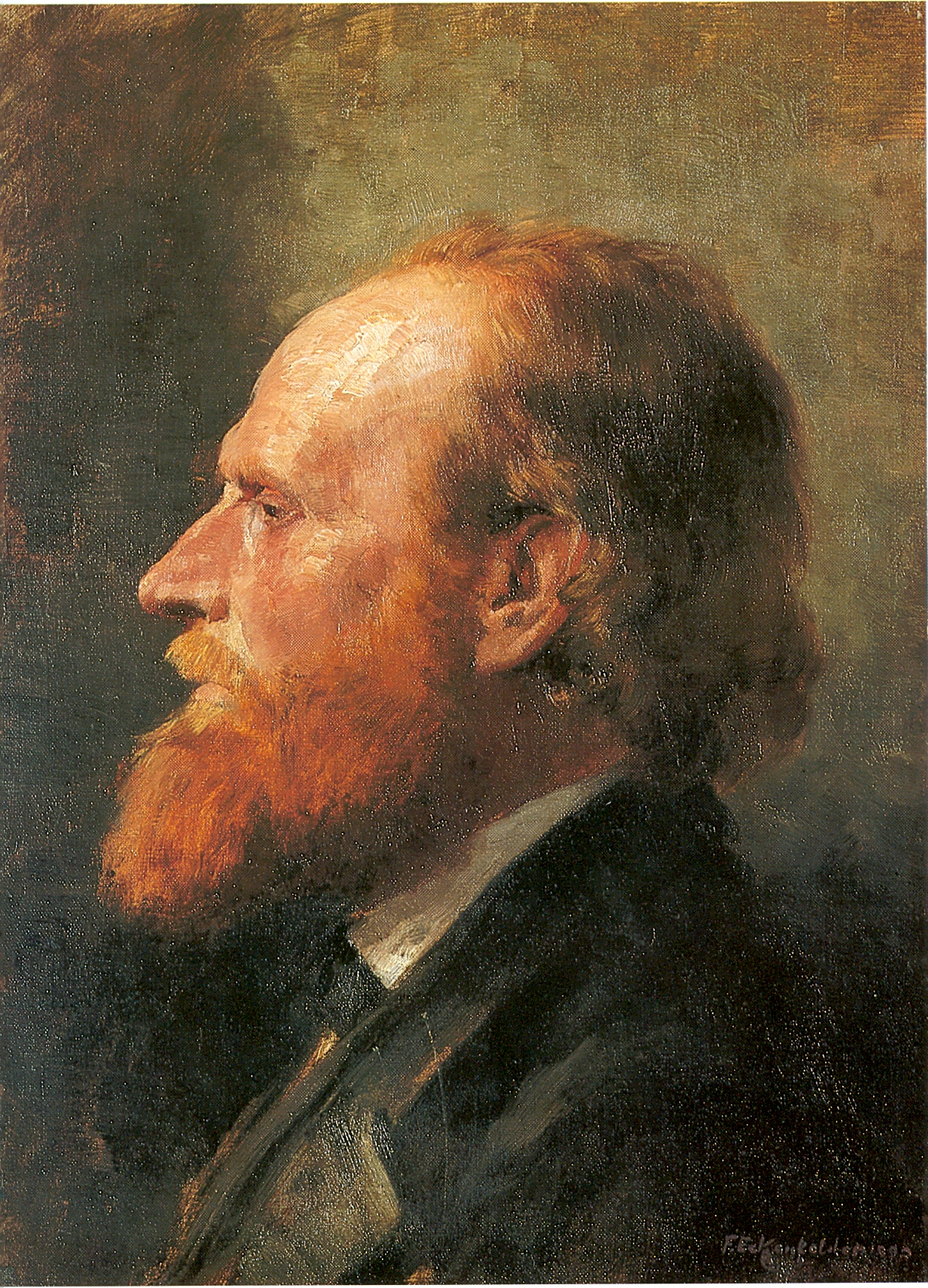
Albert Kappis, portrait by Friedrich Eckenfelder (1890)

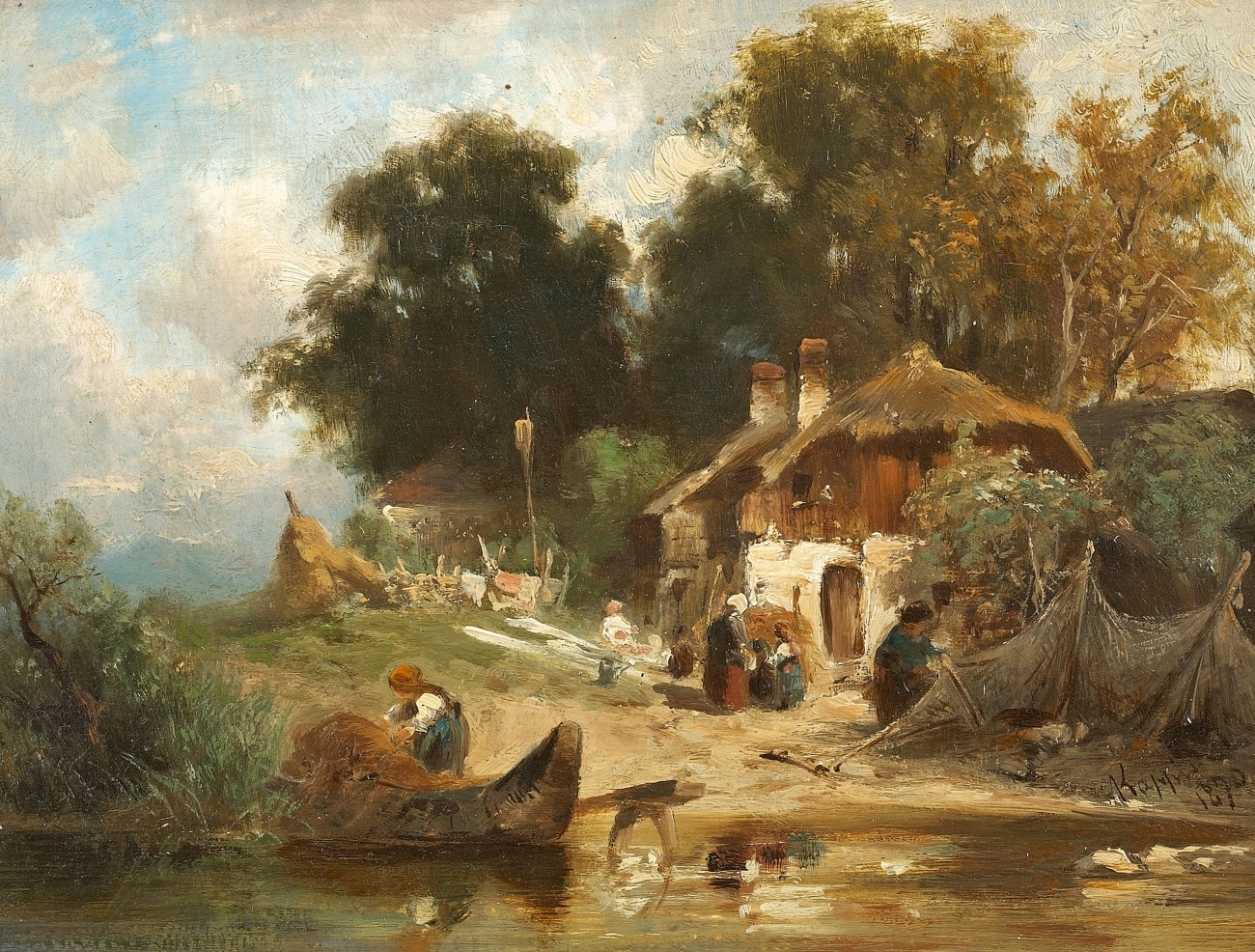
Fisherman's House by the Lakeside (1890)

Albert Kappis (20 August 1836, Wildberg - 18 September 1914, Stuttgart) was a German painter and draughtsperson specializing in landscapes and genre motifs.

== Biography ==
From 1850 to 1857, Kappis trained as a lithographer in his uncle's workshop. he also took drawing lessons and, from 1855 to 1860, attended classes at the Royal Art School in Stuttgart under Heinrich von Rustige and Bernhard von Neher. In 1860, he began his studies at the Academy of Fine Arts Munich under Karl von Piloty. While there, he made friends with fellow painters from Swabia, including Anton Braith, Ludwig Willroider, Friedrich Salzer and Jakob Grünenwald.

In 1867, together with Braith and his friend, Christian Mali, Kappis made a study trip to Paris where he became involved with the Barbizon School. He made a return trip through Belgium and the Moselle Valley to Düsseldorf and spent some time working with the landscape painter Theodor Schüz. From 1871 to 1874 he lived with Braith and Mali in their so-called "Swabian Castle".

He married in 1874, spent his honeymoon in the South Tyrol, and produced many paintings of the area around Starnberg and the Chiemsee. He was appointed a Professor at the Royal Art School at Stuttgart in 1880 and became a leader of the Swabian Impressionists. This was followed by painting trips to a wide range of areas from Bavaria to the Baltic Sea. He retired in 1905.

== Sources ==
- Schefold, Max: Albert Kappis, Maler, 1836–1914. In: Lebensbilder aus Schwaben und Franken 7, 1960, S. 347–351. Stuttgart: Kohlhammer, 1960.
- Bühler, Hans-Peter und Kappis, Albert: Albert Kappis 1905–1975. Kunsthaus Bühler, Veröffentlichung zum 70jährigen Jubiläum. Stuttgart: Kunsthaus Bühler, 1975.
- Münchner Maler im 19. Jahrhundert in vier Bänden. Vol. 2: Gebhardt–Küstner. München: Bruckmann, 1982. ISBN 3-7654-1802-1.
- Bühler, Andreas; Zimmermann, Gabriele; Grüner, Isabel: Albert Kappis: Wegbereiter des Impressionismus in Schwaben. Katalog zur Ausstellung Kunsthaus Bühler, 30. January 20. March 1999 und Kunststiftung Hohenkarpfen, 28. March 4. July 1999. Stuttgart: Kunsthaus Bühler; Hausen-Hohenkarpfen: Ed. Kunststiftung Hohenkarpfen, 1999. ISBN 3-930569-19-1.
- Bühler, Andreas: Albert Kappis, von der Münchner Schule zum schwäbischen Impressionismus. In: Weltkunst 70/6, München 2000, S. 1079–1081.
