= Isartor =

Medieval fortification in Munich

Coordinates: 48°8′06″N 11°34′54″E

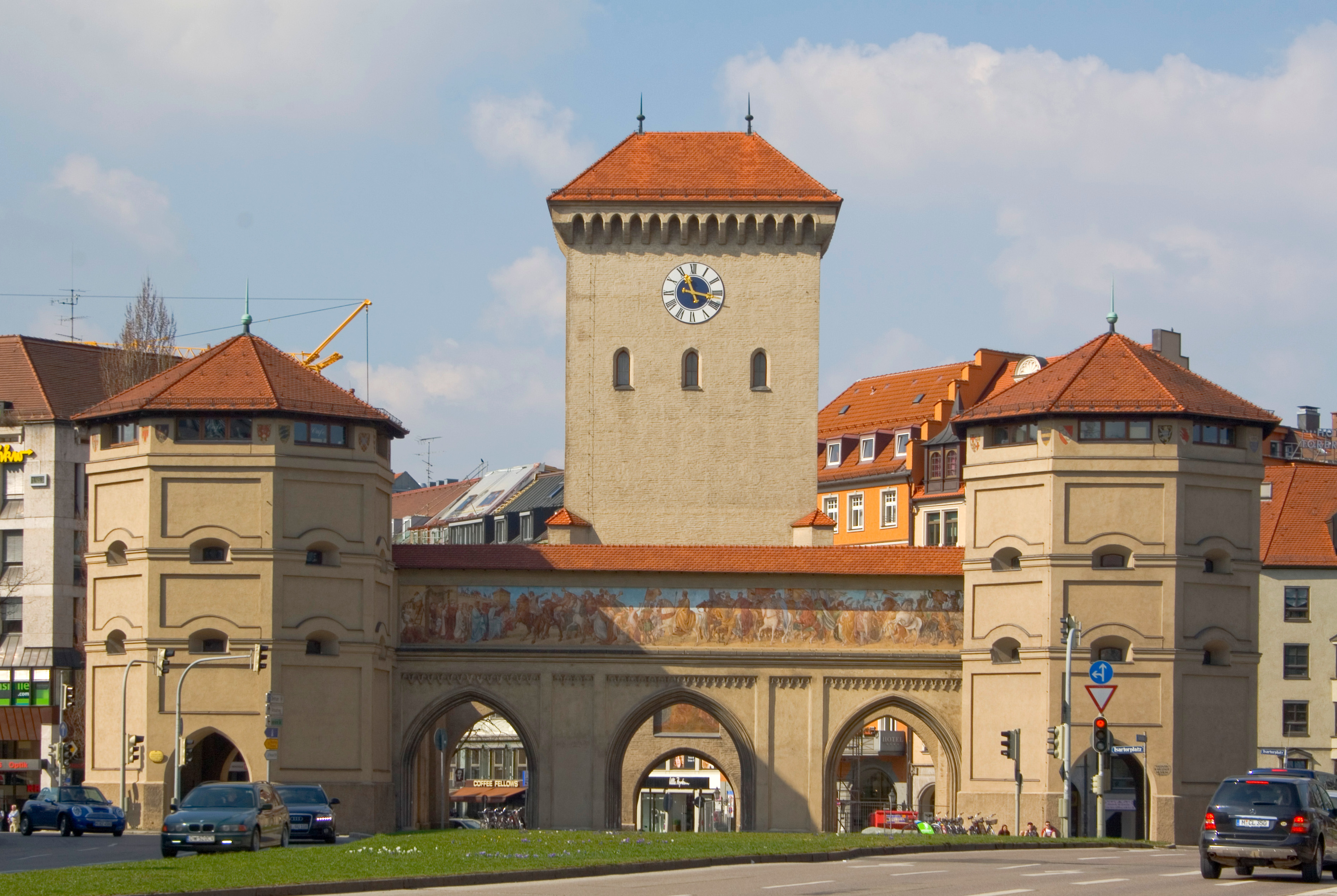
Isartor (2012)

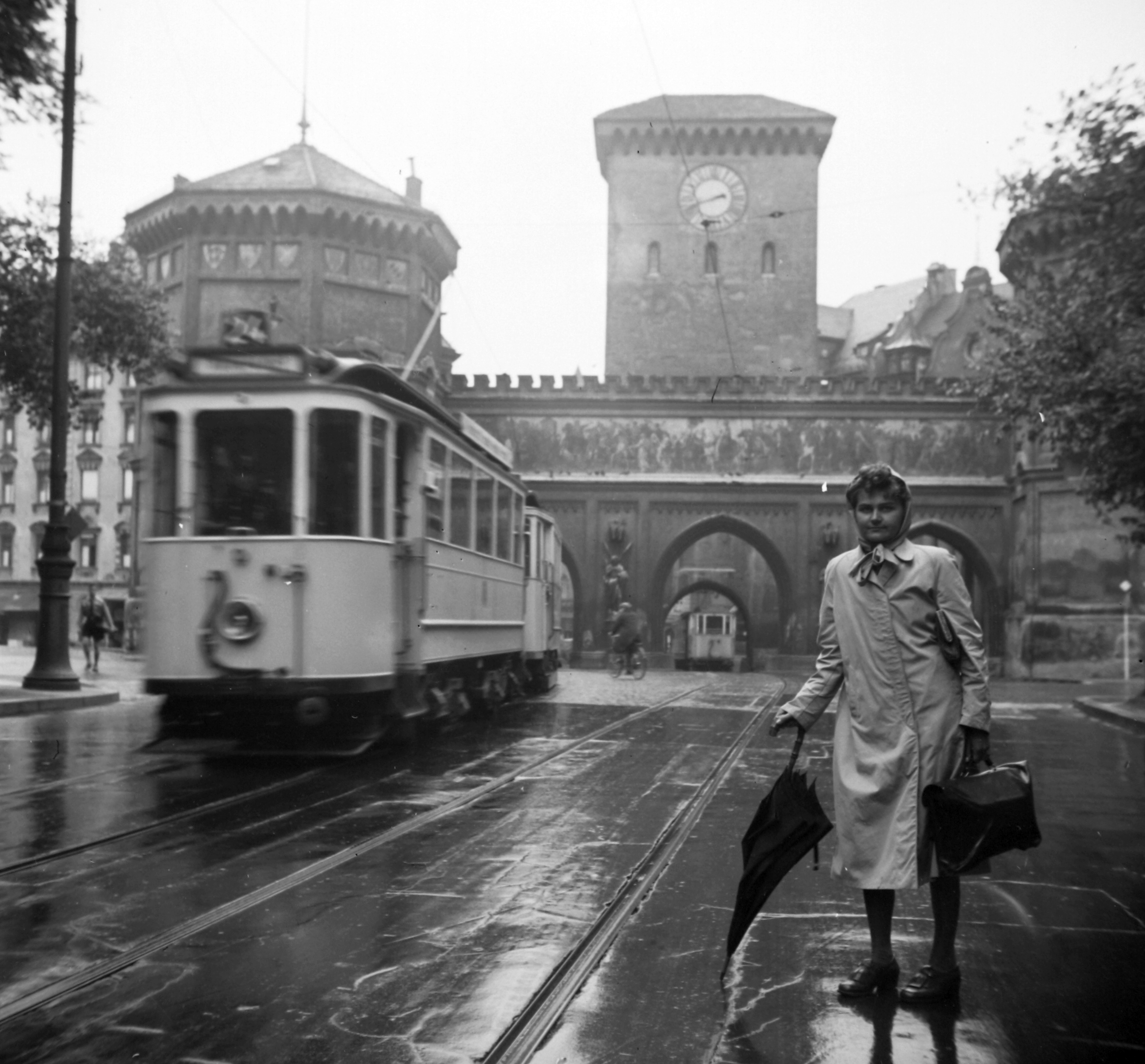
Isartor in 1939 with the tram passing through it

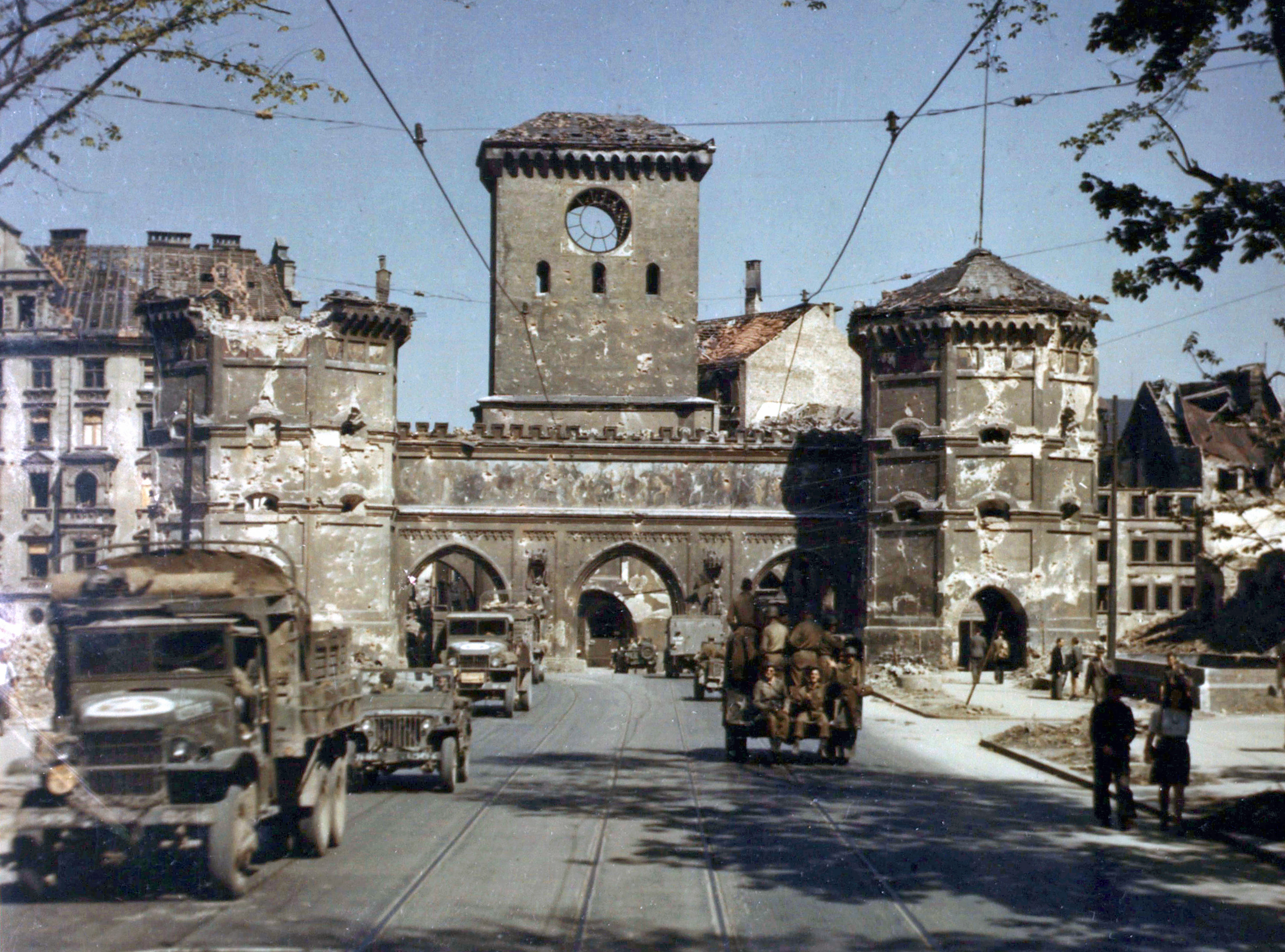
Partially destroyed Isartor in June 1945

The Isartor at the Isartorplatz in Munich is one of four main gates of the medieval city wall. It served as a fortification for the defence and is the most easterly of Munich's three remaining gothic town gates (Isartor, Sendlinger Tor and Karlstor). The gate (German: Tor) is located close to the Isar and was named after the river.

== Architecture ==
The Isartor was constructed in 1337 within the scope of the enlargement of Munich and the construction of the second city wall between 1285 and 1337 which was completed under the Emperor Louis IV. The gate first consisted of a 40-meter-high (130 ft) main gate tower. Only with the construction of the moat wall of the gate tower the two flanking side towers were added and served as barbican. The Isartor is today the only medieval gate in Munich which has conserved its medium main tower and the restoration in 1833–1835 by Friedrich von Gärtner has recreated the dimensions and appearance close to the original structure. The frescos, created in 1835 by Bernhard von Neher, depict the victorious return of Emperor Louis after the Battle of Mühldorf in 1322.

The Isartor today houses a humorous museum which is dedicated to the comedian and actor Karl Valentin. A café for visitors has been integrated.

The Isartortheater, which produced Singspiele and spoken plays in the early 19th century, was destroyed in the Second World War. After being heavily damaged by shelling, the medieval gate was rebuilt.

Isartorplatz is served by the S Bahn station which is named Isartor after the gate. The S-Bahn station is complemented by two tram lines crossing the square at its eastern side. For decades, however, no more Trams or busses undercrossed the actual gate.
