= Joseph Wenglein =

German painter

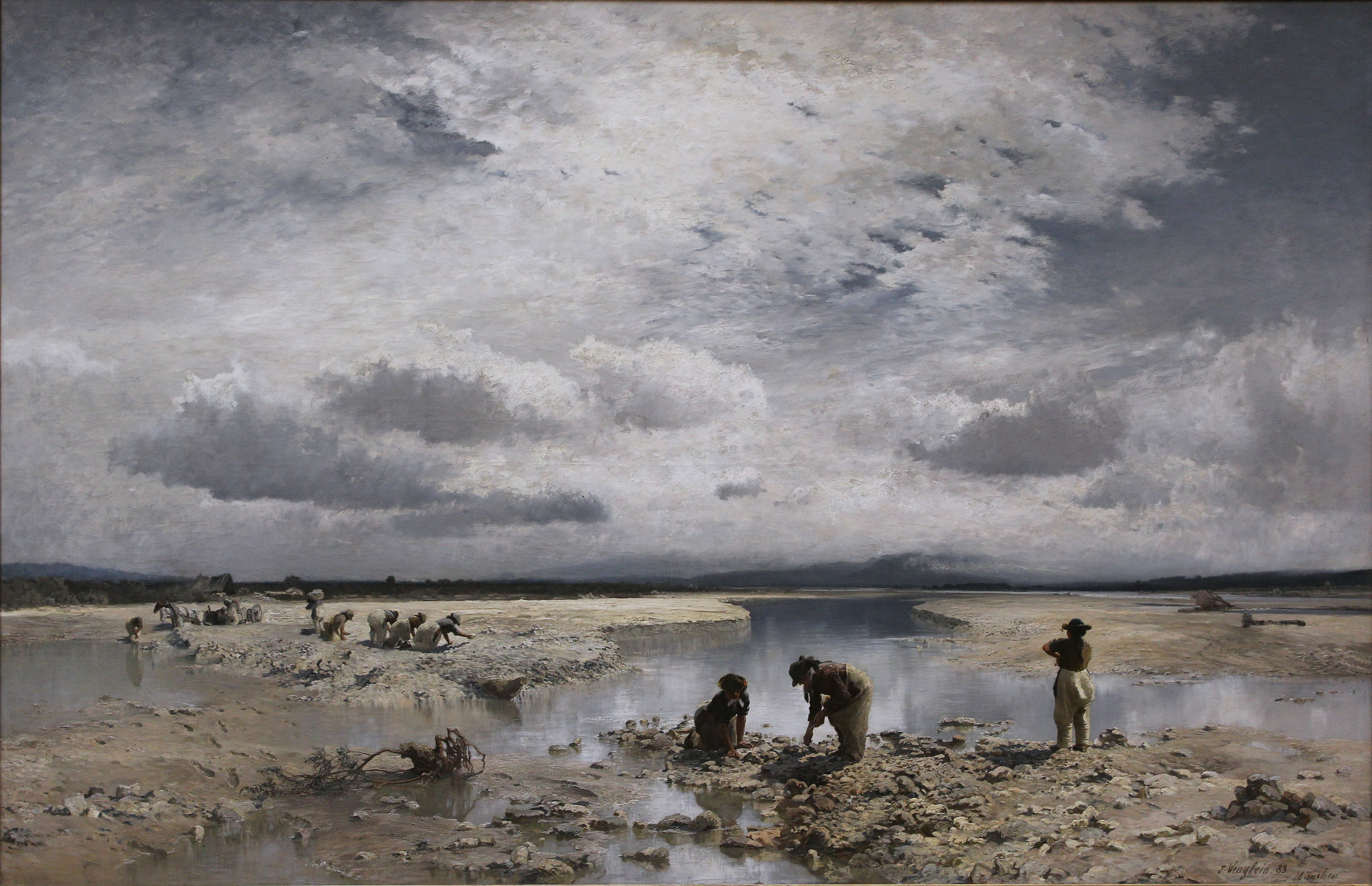
Limestone Foragers in the Bed of the Isar (1883)

Joseph Wenglein (5 October 1845, Munich – 18 January 1919, Bad Tölz) was a German landscape painter and illustrator.

== Life ==
He was born in Munich and is known for his landscapes. He attended both the Munich Academy of Fine Arts and LMU Munich, where he studied law. Eventually, he chose to focus entirely on art and found a position in the studios of the landscape painter Johann Gottfried Steffan. On his recommendation, Wenglein became a student of Adolf Heinrich Lier, whose coloristic methods were a significant influence.

His favorite areas for painting were the Bavarian plateau and the region around the Isar River. Later, he became a teacher himself. His best-known student was Otto Reiniger.
