= Jakob Grünenwald =

German painter

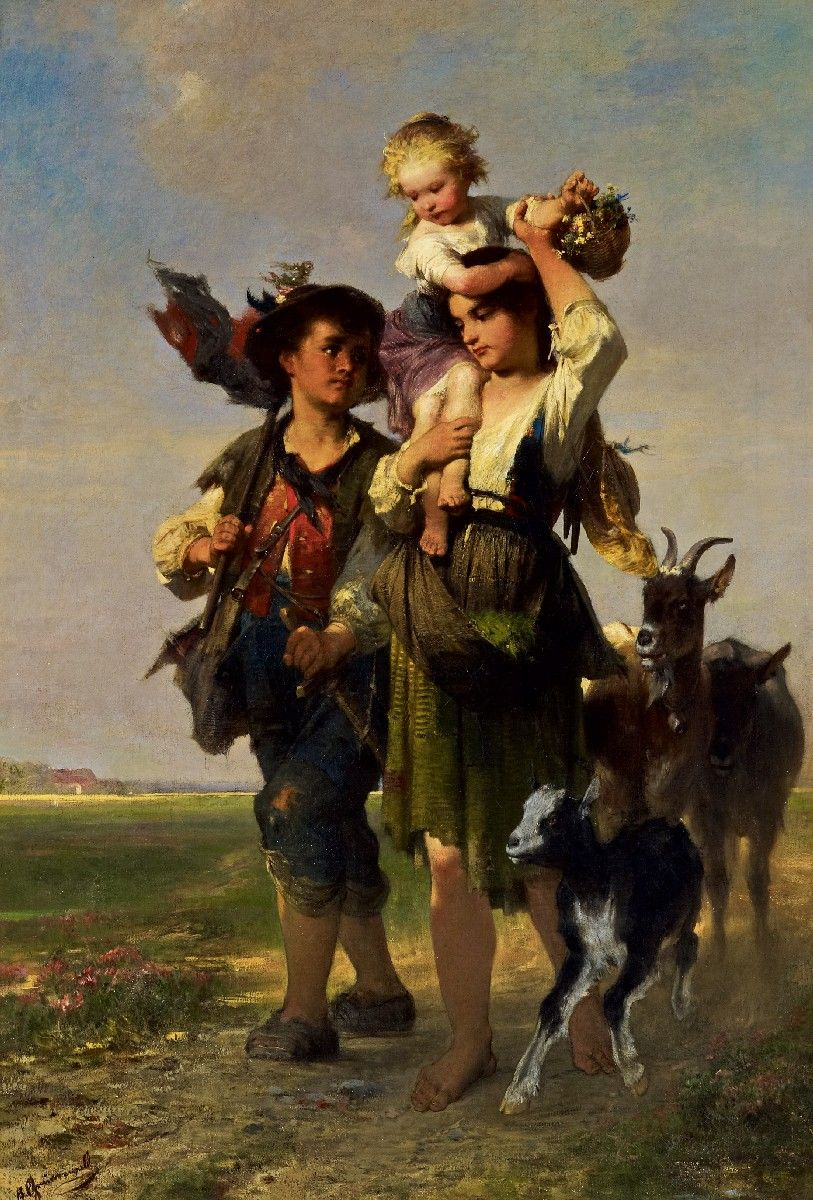
Children with Goats (1896). Oil on canvas, 117 x 80 cm.

Jakob Grünenwald (30 September 1821, Bünzwangen — 26 September 1896, Stuttgart) was a German genre painter and illustrator.

== Life ==
Grünenwald was the eighth child of a family who worked a small farm. In 1840, he began his studies at the State Academy of Fine Arts Stuttgart, where he studied history painting under Bernhard von Neher, who steered him towards religious themes. In 1853, he moved to Munich, where he worked with Anton Braith, Albert Kappis and Carl Spitzweg, among others.

Grünenwald received numerous public contracts and, until 1881, participated in many exhibitions in Dresden, Berlin and the Munich Glaspalast. He created most of his best-known works in Munich and concentrated on genre painting.

As interest in his work began to wane, he received an appointment to the Stuttgart Academy, through the mediation of his former teacher, Neher. He was head of the drawing department there from 1877 until his death. Among his students were Karl Bauer, Georg Jauss und Hermann Pleuer. As a member of the "Society for Christian Art in the Evangelical Church of Württemberg" he had a major influence on contemporary religious art.

Unfortunately, Grünenwald's work later fell into oblivion, although many of his paintings were widely distributed as steel engravings. It wasn't until the 1980s, during a resurgence of interest in genre painting, that his works were rediscovered. Today, his works may be found in the Municipal Museum at Göppingen, the Landesmuseum Württemberg and at his memorial in Bünzwangen.

== See also ==
- List of German painters
