= Wunibald Kamm =

German automobile designer (1893–1966)

- Born: 26 April 1893; Basel, Germany
- Died: 11 October 1966 (aged 73); Stuttgart, Germany
- Occupations: Engineer, aerodynamicist
- Awards: Automotive Hall of Fame

Wunibald Kamm (26 April 1893 – 11 October 1966) was a German automobile designer, engineer, and aerodynamicist. He is best known for his breakthrough in reducing car turbulence at high speeds; the style of car bodywork based on his research has come to be known as a Kammback or a Kamm-tail (Kamm-Heck). In addition, in German, the circle of forces is usually connected with his name (Kammscher Kreis).

== Design ==
One goal of automotive aerodynamics is to reduce the air turbulence, or drag, caused by the shape of the automobile. Aerodynamic drag may be reduced either by reduction of frontal area or by reduction of the drag coefficient. In bodies such as automobiles and airships, drag decreases after the rear of a car's cross-sectional area is reduced to fifty percent of the car's maximum cross section; "the best position is nearer 45 percent of the length, and ... to have this maximum cross-section nearer the rear end than the front, and its drag has proved even less". There are other aspects of the car's design such as keeping the flow of air attached to the body far to the back of the car as possible to minimize pressure drag (the Bernoulli relationship). A design with less drag means higher efficiency and an increased maximum speed, given the same powertrain.

== Career ==
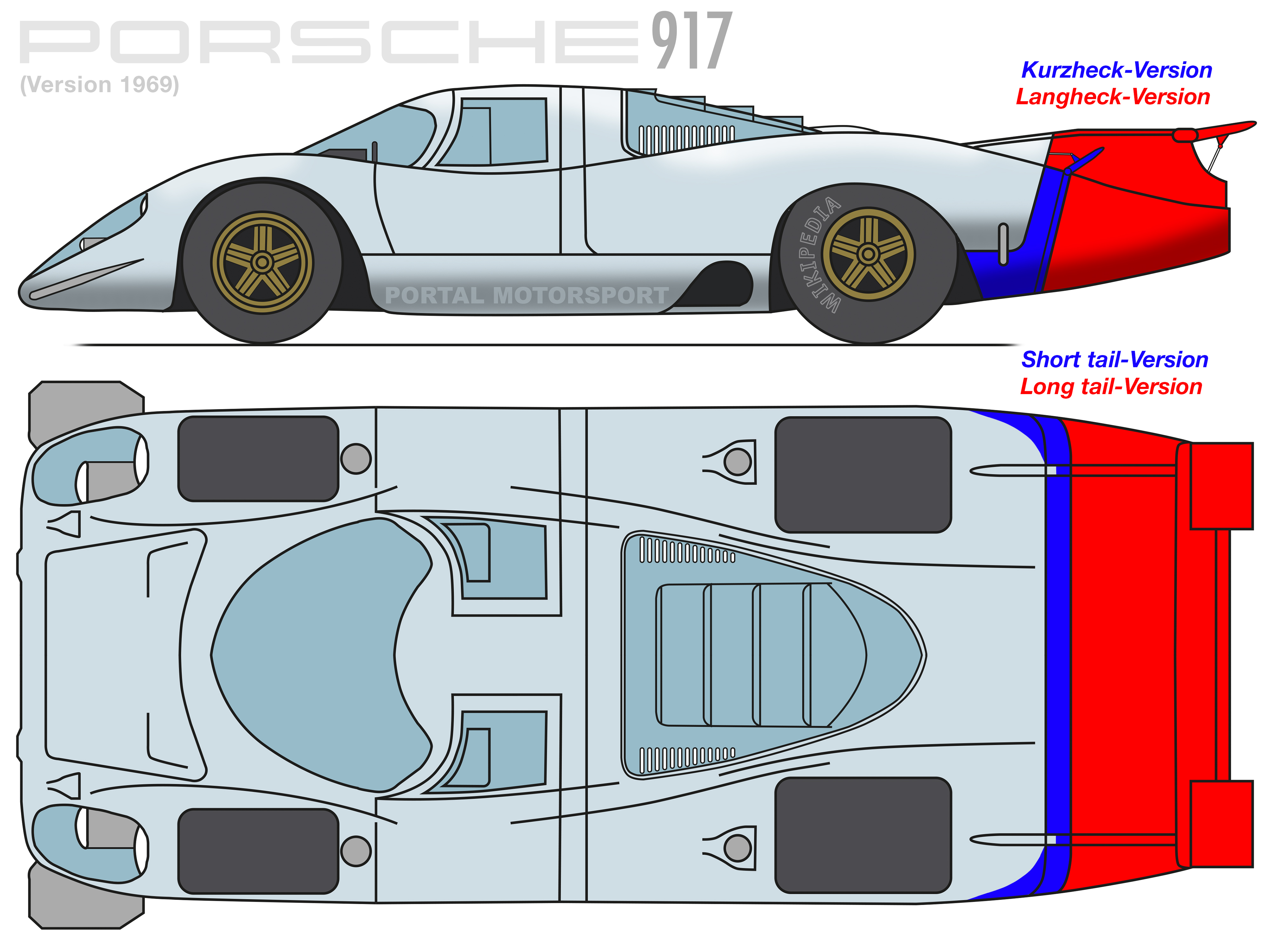
1969 Porsche 917 versions illustrate Kamm's principle: with long tail (red) or truncated (blue), both offering low drag, but not enough downforce for racing success

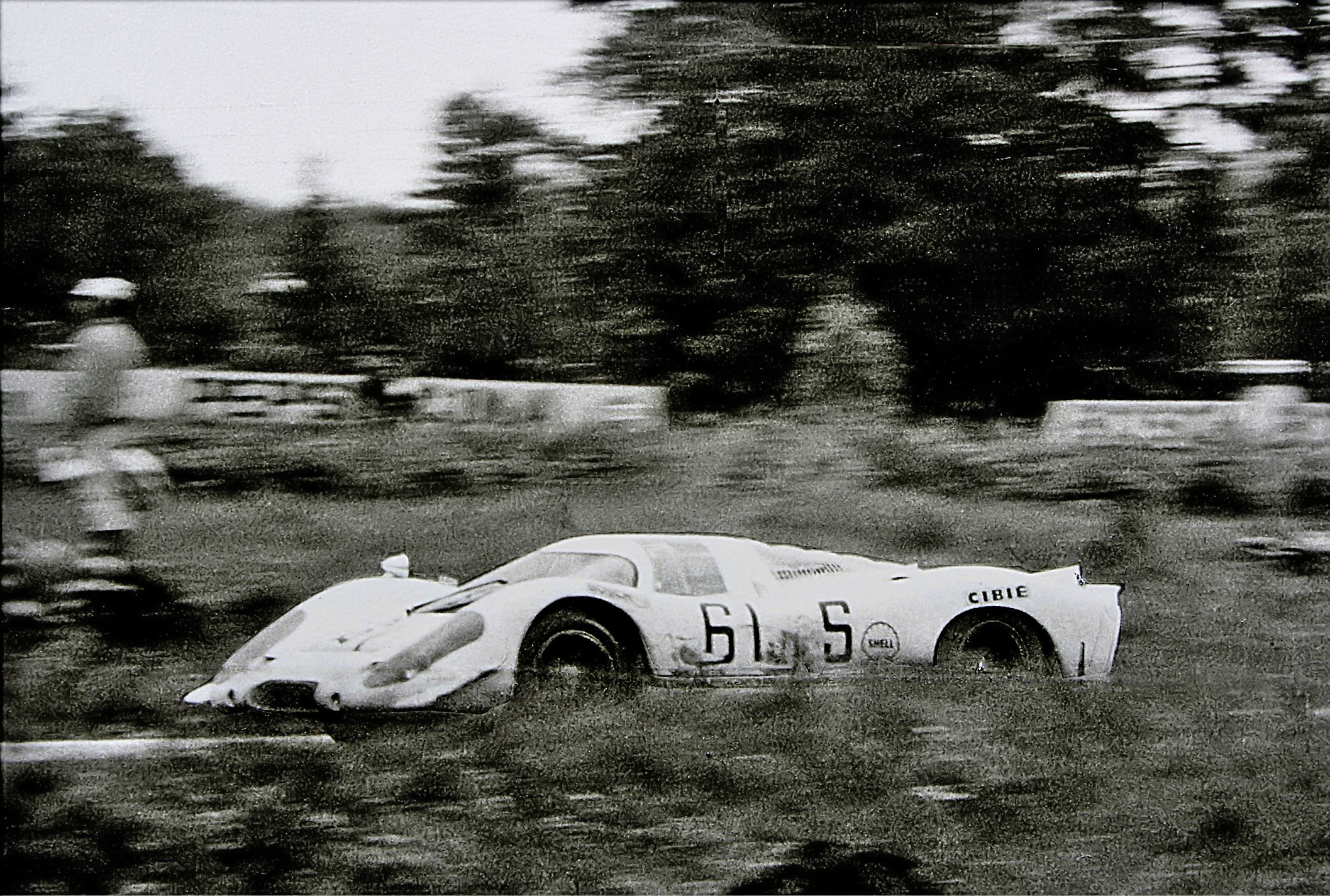
1969 Porsche 917 racing with truncated Kamm-Heck

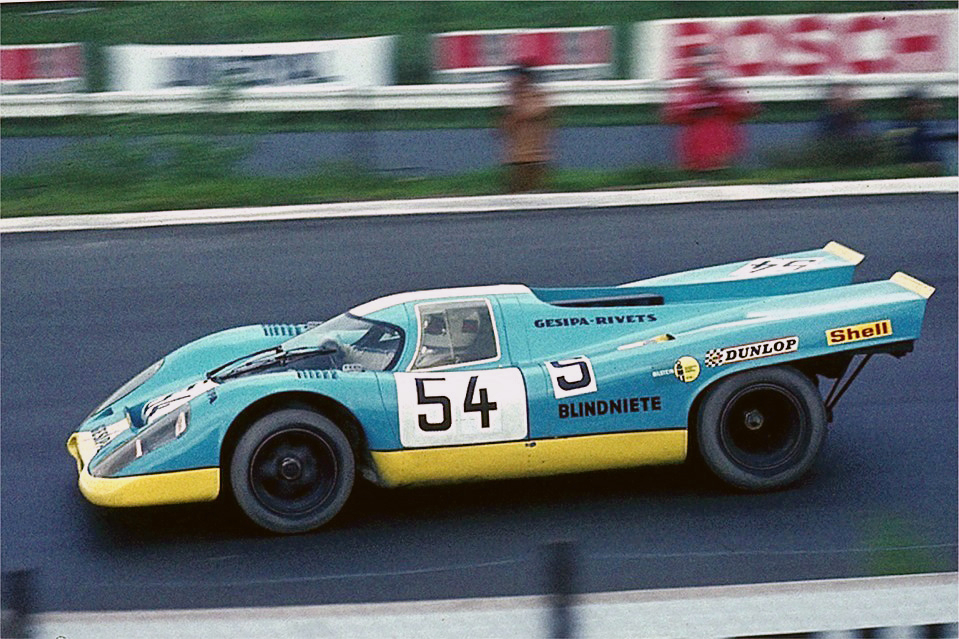
1970 Porsche 917K with wedge-shape tail that combines low drag with sufficient downforce to win Le Mans

German Professor, Wunibald Kamm worked with aerodynamics engineer Baron Reinhard von Koenig-Fachsenfeld. As a low drag tear-drop shaped body is considered too long for many uses, they developed a design with a smooth roofline and a taper in the automobile's body that is suddenly chopped off at the rear end. This design makes the air flow act nearly as if the full tapered "tail" was still present on the vehicle. A full-size prototype was developed in 1938. It was a four-door sedan featuring a sharply truncated rear end. The test car represented a compromise between low air resistance and practicality in the automobile's size and shape.

In the 1920s, Kamm worked for Daimler designing engineering race car engines. Thereafter, a prototype, namely the Kamm “SHW Wagen” incorporated principles that have become standard parts of the car engineering toolbox. He paid particular attention to the suspension and minimizing vehicle weight. These improvements included extremely low-weight design, an aluminum semi-monocoque body, front wheel drive, boxer-style engines (horizontally opposed cylinders), independent suspension on all wheels, and coil springs mated to hydraulic shock absorbers. His comprehensive approach to automotive engineering and design presaged the concept of "Mechatronics," a word that did not come into existence until 1971.

Established in 1930, the Research Institute of Automotive Engineering and Vehicle Engines located near Stuttgart (German: Forschungsinstitut für Kraftfahrwesen und Fahrzeugmotoren Stuttgart - FKFS) was called the "Kamm-Institut" after its founder and long-time director.

In 1945, after having been detained by the French, he came to the U.S. as one of the first hundred German scientists (see Operation Paperclip#Similar_operations) stationed at the Dayton, Ohio Wright-Patterson Air Force Base and remained there as a consulting engineer until 1953. That year, he went as a professor to the Stevens Institute of Technology in Hoboken, New Jersey. For three years beginning in 1955 he was head of Mechanical Engineering at the Battelle Memorial Institute in Frankfurt, Germany.

Kamm was inducted into the Automotive Hall of Fame. He did pioneering work in aerodynamics, driving dynamics, tire technology, minimalist construction techniques, engine combustion efficiency. Wind tunnels were an effectively applied technology, and he "built the first full-scale wind tunnel for motor vehicles." "Dr. Kamm, even today, and perhaps even more so because of his foresight, is considered one of the greatest researchers in automotive engineering." His work on turbulence is considered to have been a "breakthrough" and fundamental.

== Awards and honors ==
- In 1958, he received the German Service Cross, First Class.
- The University of Braunschweig conferred an honorary Ph.D. in recognition of technical lifetime achievements.
- Asteroid 22499 Wunibaldkamm was named in his memory. The official naming citation was published by the Minor Planet Center on 25 September 2018 (M.P.C. 111798).

== The first "Kamm coupe" ==
In late summer 1938, BMW tested a prototype of the so-called "Kamm-Coupe" based on their 328 chassis. It had a drag coefficient of only 0.25 compared to the great 1940 Mille Miglia winning BMW 328 Touring Coupe with a drag coefficient of 0.35. This automaker's naming of its coupé model appears to be the earliest use of "Kamm" to publicly describe an automobile body incorporating the Koenig-Fachsenfeld's design patent.

== Kammback named production cars (USA) ==
- AMC Gremlin and AMC Eagle Kammback — The truncated hatchback design increased interior space capacity, not for streamlining.
- Chevrolet Vega Kammback — The station wagon design has more taper than the Gremlin, but not enough to gain aero-effects.

The Kammback "cut-off tail" design continues to be popular. It often insinuates streamlining when used in production cars and is a design technique to make the vehicle look "sporty". Kamm's design approach is found on popular mass-market vehicles, supercars, alternative fuel vehicles, as well as for race cars.
