= Hermann Pleuer =

German Impressionist and landscape artist

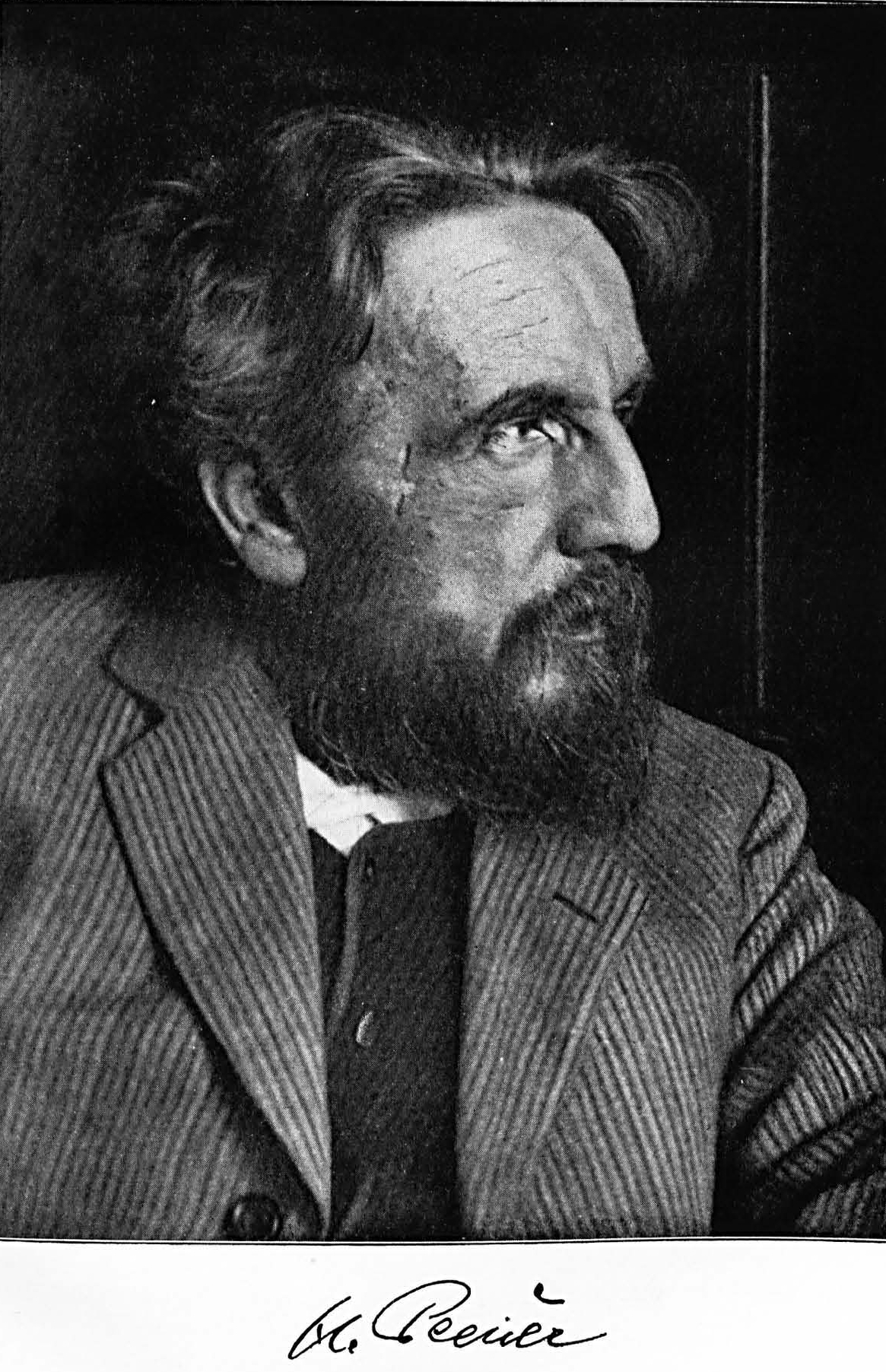
Hermann Pleuer (1911)

Hermann Pleuer (5 April 1863, in Schwäbisch Gmünd – 6 January 1911, in Stuttgart) was a German Impressionist and landscape artist who is best known for his paintings of the Royal Württemberg State Railways.

== Biography ==
He was the son of a goldsmith and jeweler. After initial studies at the Stuttgart School of Applied Arts (1879–1881) and the State Academy of Fine Arts Stuttgart (1881–1883) he completed his studies at the Academy of Fine Arts Munich.

He returned to Stuttgart in 1886 and led a bohemian life style, painting nudes and scenes from the local night life. By the end of the 1880s, he had become fascinated with industrial technology and what was called the "Rausch der Geschwindigkeit" (Thrill of Speed), As a result, he turned to painting the trains and train stations of the State Railways.

His work was supported by a patron, Franz Baron von Koenig-Fachsenfeld (1866-1918), who bought many of his paintings and placed them in the family castle. Later, he became a member of the Deutscher Künstlerbund.

He died from tuberculosis at the early age of 47. There is a Hermann-Pleuer-Weg in Ostfildern and a Hermann-Pleuer-Straße in Stuttgart.

In 1982 the Baron's son, Reinhard, a well-known inventor and automotive engineer, created a foundation to preserve his father's castle and open it to public access. Pleuer's works may also be seen at the Kunstmuseum Stuttgart.

== Selected paintings ==
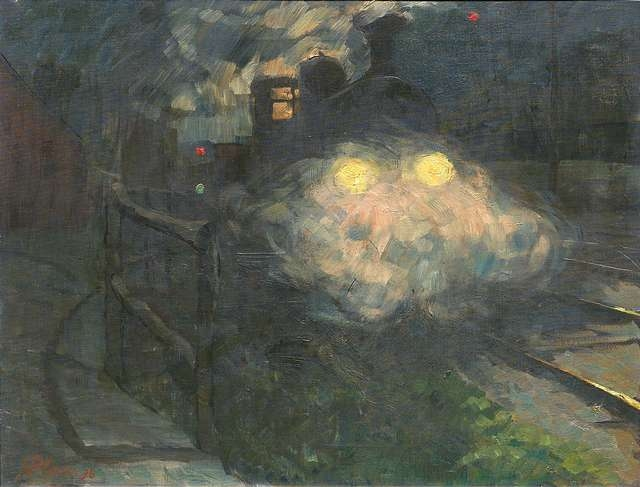
Steam Engine Smoking at Night

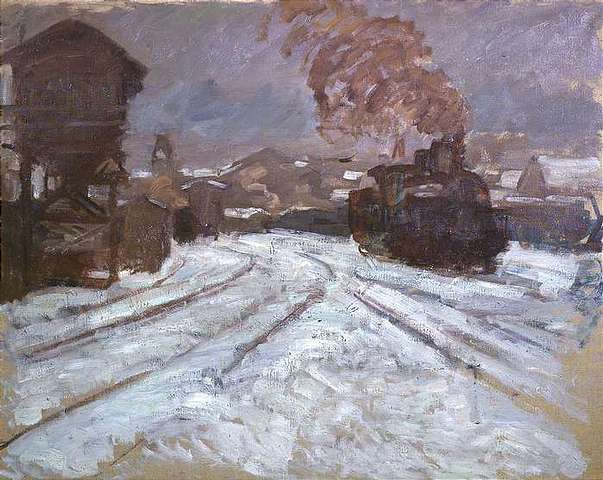
Stuttgart Central Station in the Snow

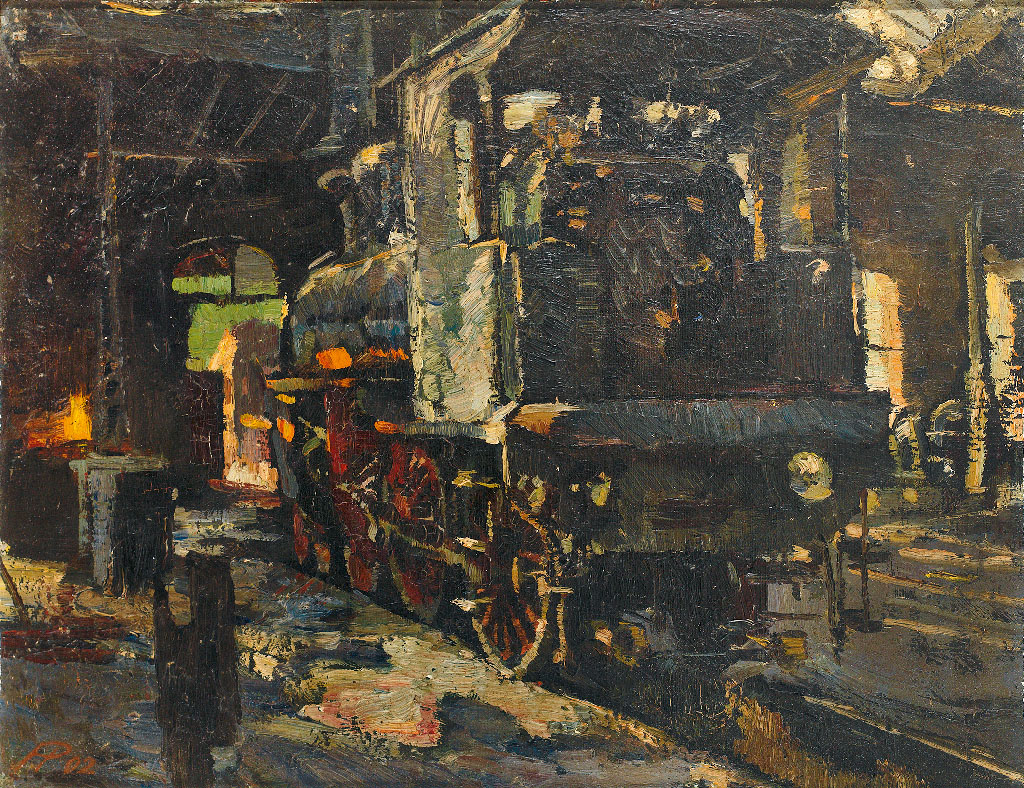
Steam Locomotive at the Station

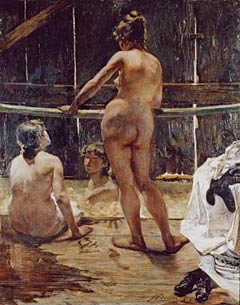
The Bathing Girls
