= Theodor Schüz =

German painter

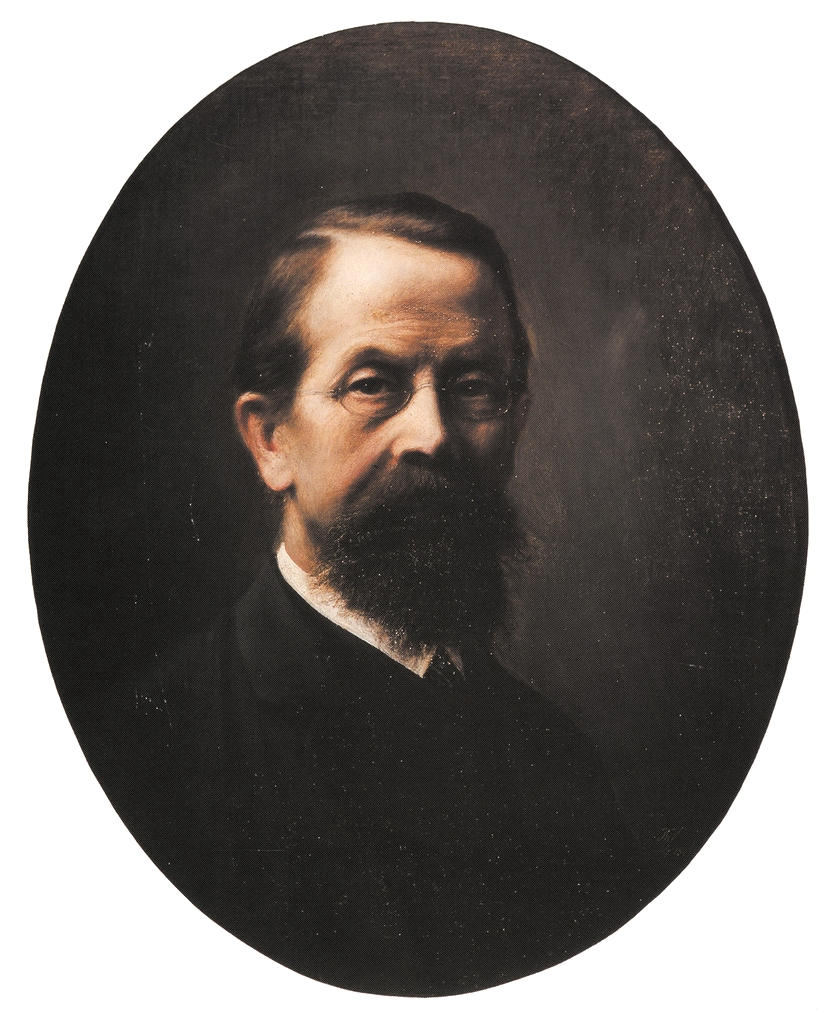
Self-portrait (1896)

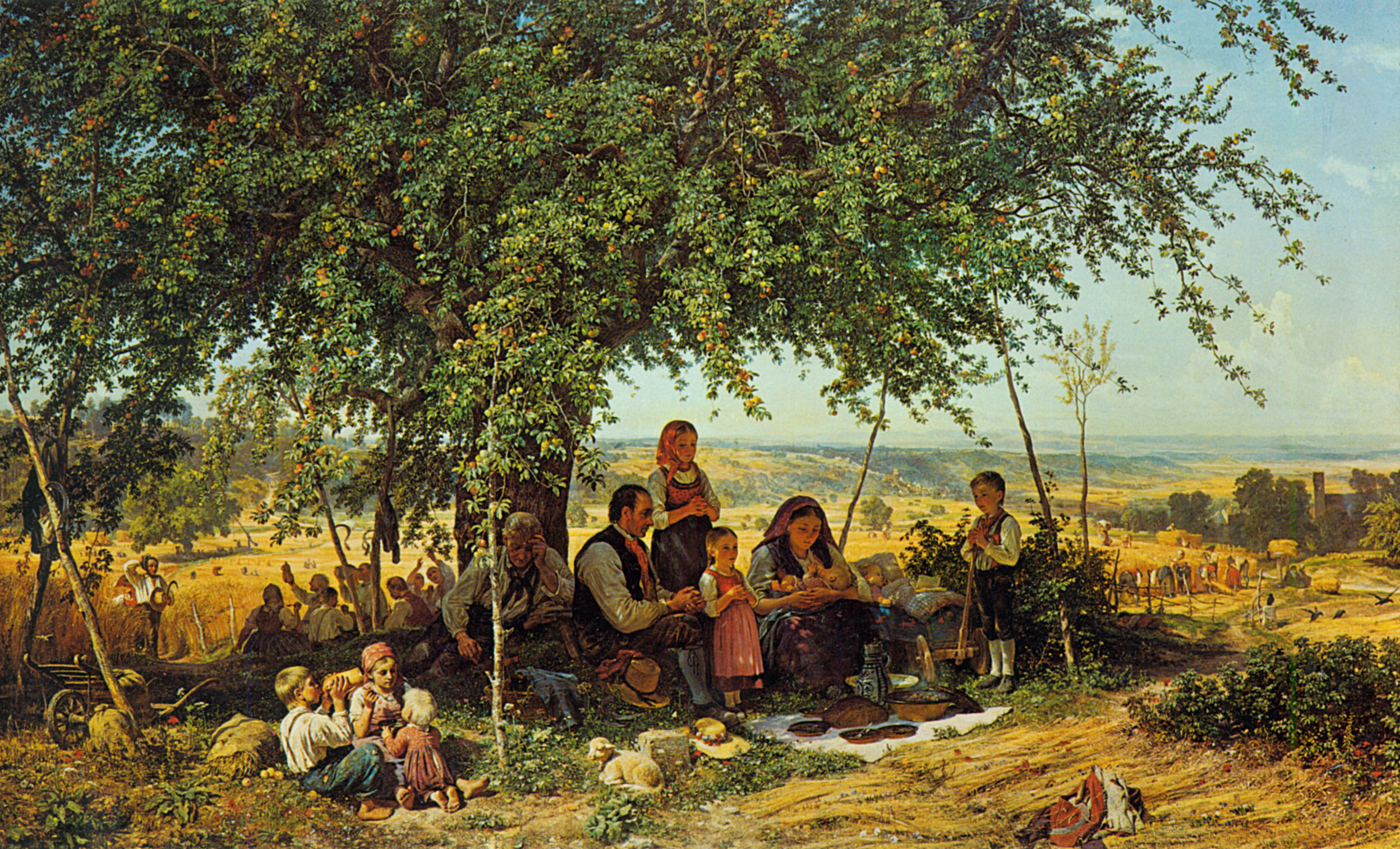
Noon Prayer at the Harvest

Theodor Christoph Schüz (26 March 1830, Waldachtal - 17 June 1900, Düsseldorf) was a German painter associated with the Düsseldorfer Malerschule.

== Biography ==
He was the youngest son of an evangelical pastor. He was originally trained to be a notary in Herrenberg, but later began studying art in Stuttgart. In 1856, he continued his studies at the Academy of Fine Arts, Munich. There, he became a master student of the history painter, Carl von Piloty.

In 1866, he moved to Düsseldorf, where he would remain for the rest of his life. His sons, Friedrich (1874-1954) and Hans (1883-1922) also became painters. His other son, Martin (1877-1945), was an evangelical pastor in Haigerloch, but was also an amateur watercolorist.

He gained his widest audience as an illustrator of the early works of Ottilie Wildermuth. His best known work, "Noon Prayer at the Harvest", now at the Staatsgalerie Stuttgart, was originally exhibited at the Exposition Universelle (1867). Most of his paintings are in the Late Romantic style, and many are of a religious nature.
