= Hermann Baisch =

German painter and illustrator (1846–1894)

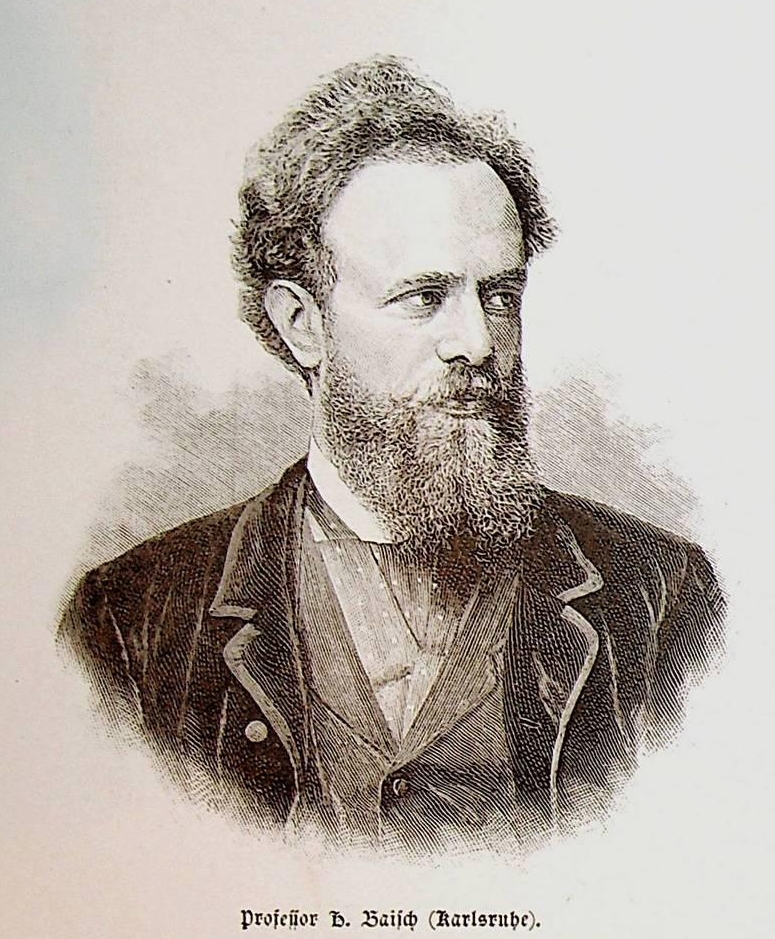
Hermann Baisch (1885)

Hermann Baisch (12 July 1846 – 18 June 1894) was a German painter and illustrator who specialized in landscapes and animals. He was one of the first artists in Germany to work in the French influenced "paysage intime" style.

== Biography ==
He was born in Dresden. His father was the lithographer, Wilhelm Gottlieb Baisch. His older brother, Otto Baisch, also became a lithographer and a writer. In 1852, his family moved to Stuttgart, where his father set up his own lithography business. After completing an apprenticeship in his father's shop, he studied painting at the State Academy of Fine Arts. When his father died in 1864, Otto took over the management of the family business.

In 1868, he went to Paris, where he copied the landscape and animal paintings of the Dutch Masters. He also became acquainted with Jules Dupré, who introduced him to the Barbizon School and the style known as "Paysage intime" (intimate landscape). After completing his studies there, he went to Munich and became a student at the private painting school operated by Adolf Lier. Although he graduated in 1873, he remained in Munich until 1880. In 1875, he married Julie Schönleber, the sister of Gustav Schönleber, who had become his friend at Lier's school.

He then relocated to Karlsruhe and, in 1881, became a professor of animal painting at the Grand-Ducal Baden Art School. In order that his students could learn to paint from nature, he built an open-air studio; going so far as to buy a cow and some other small animals. He also took numerous trips to Holland and the Alps to paint landscapes. In the years 1884/85 and 1893/94, he served as director of the school, which was renamed an "Academy" in 1892. He died in 1894 in Karlsruhe, after a short illness.

== Selected paintings ==
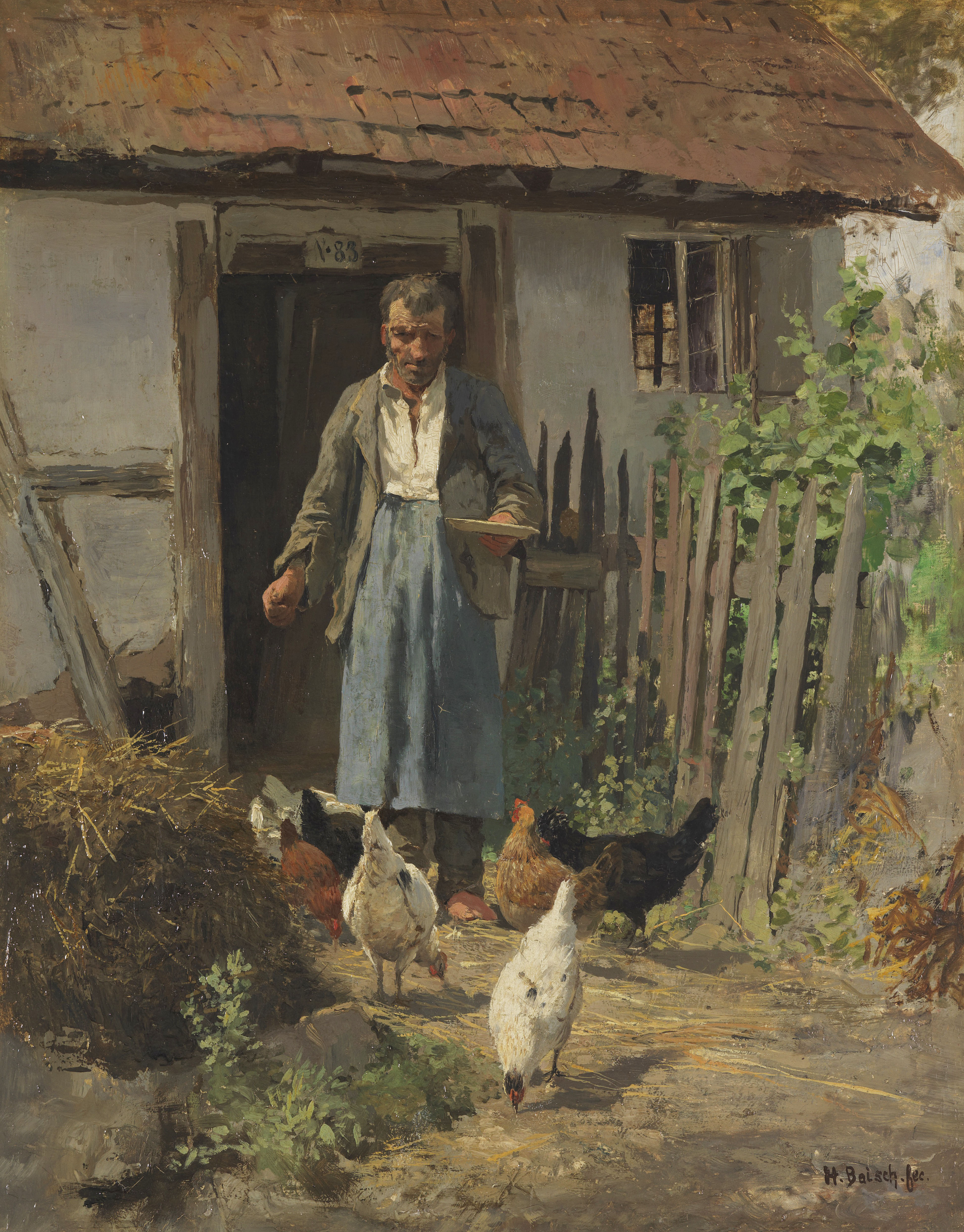
Feeding the Chickens

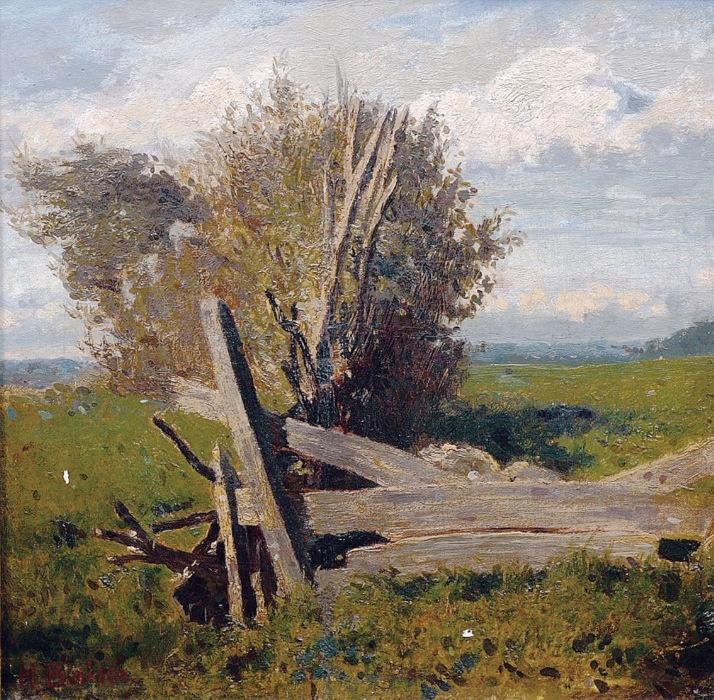
At the Meadow's Edge

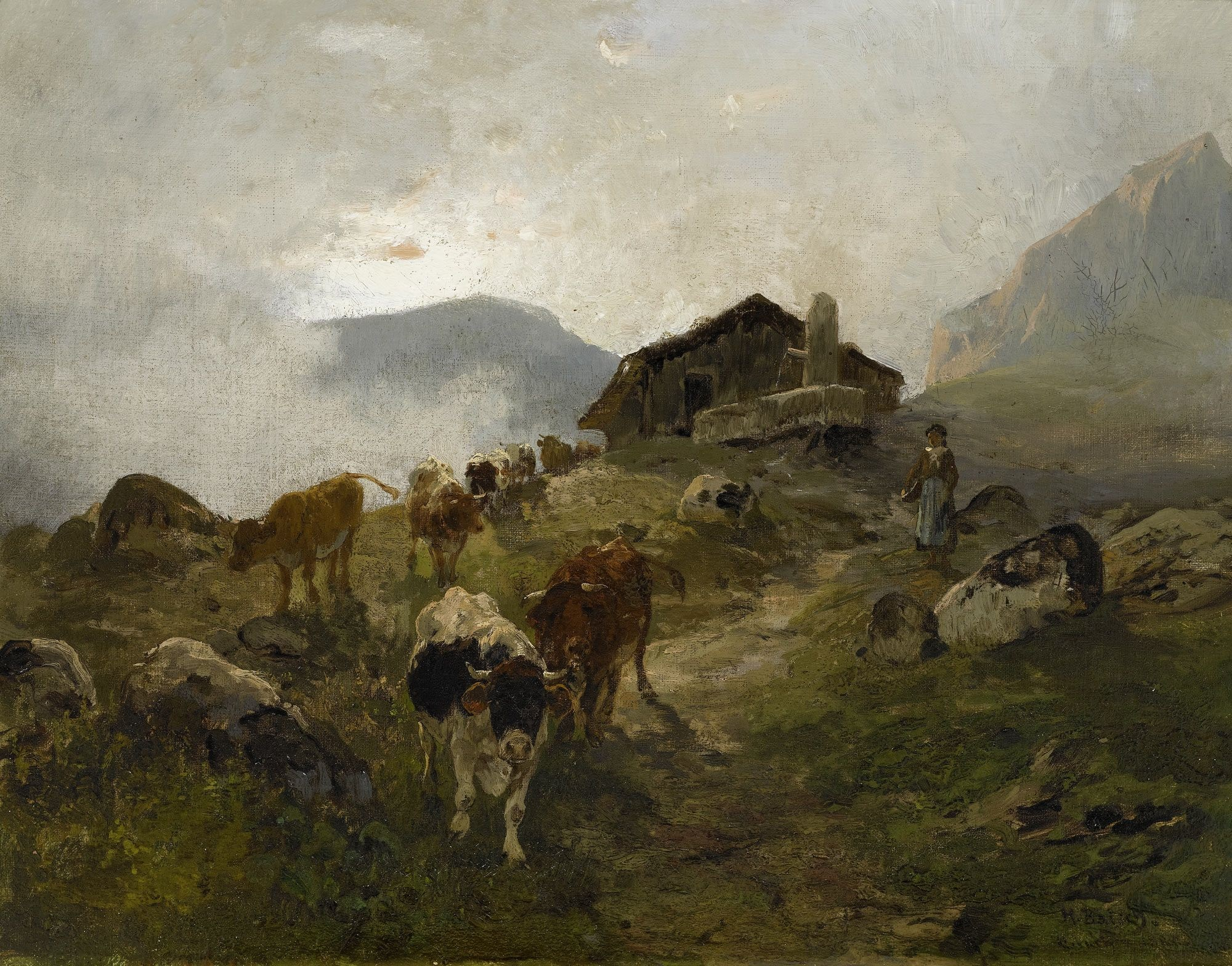
Cows on the Alm

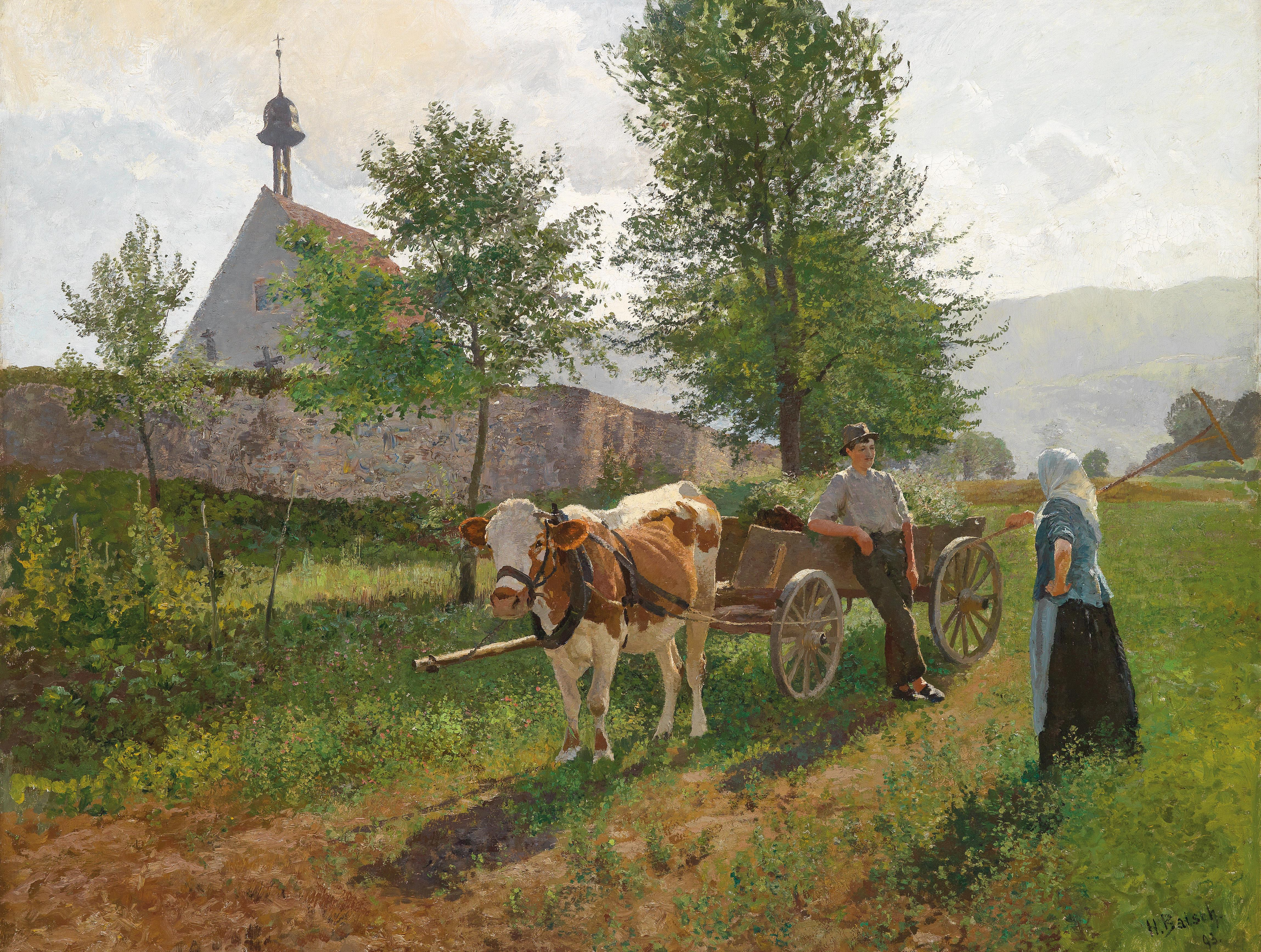
Chatting on the Field

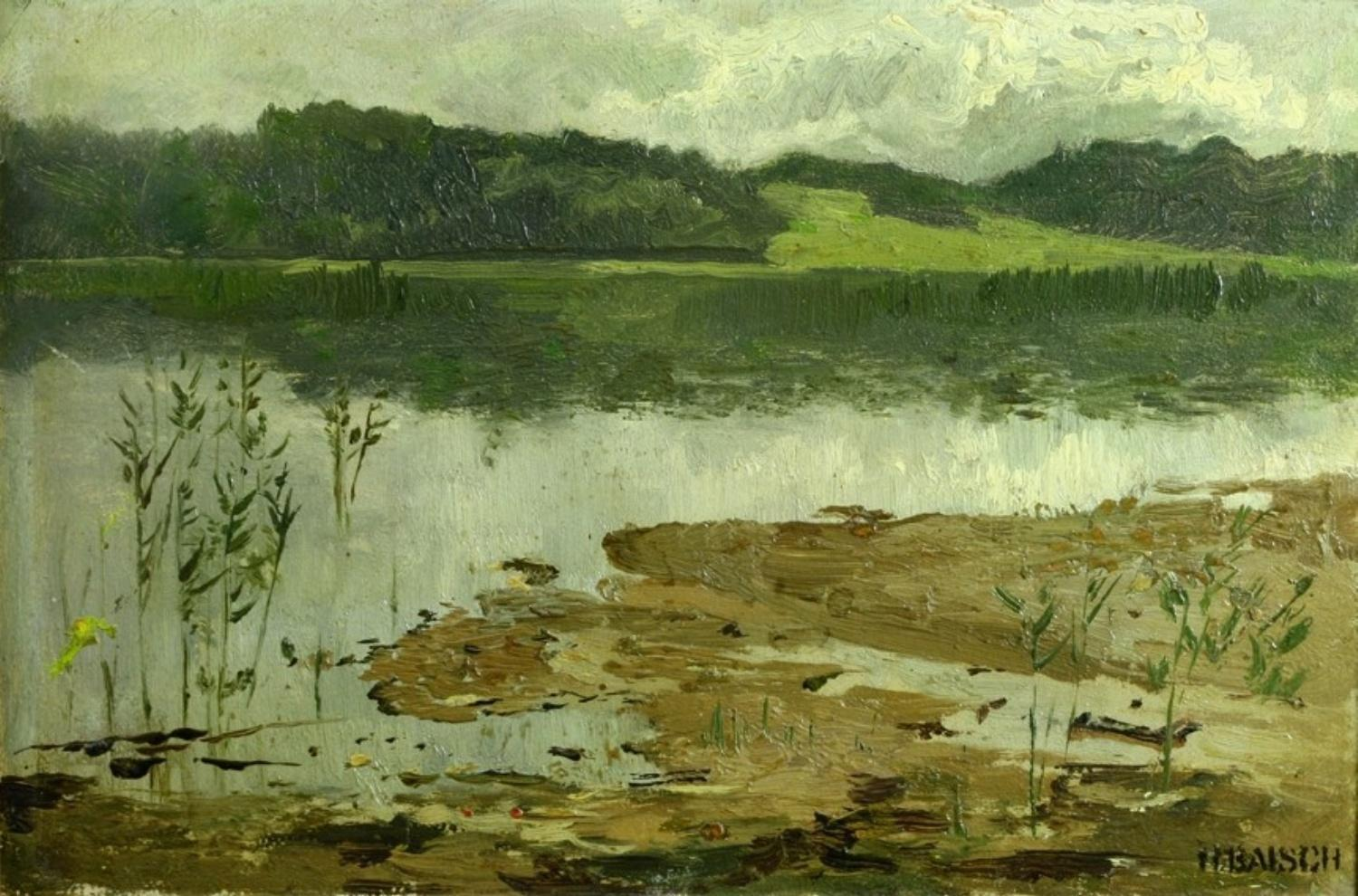
Lake Landscape

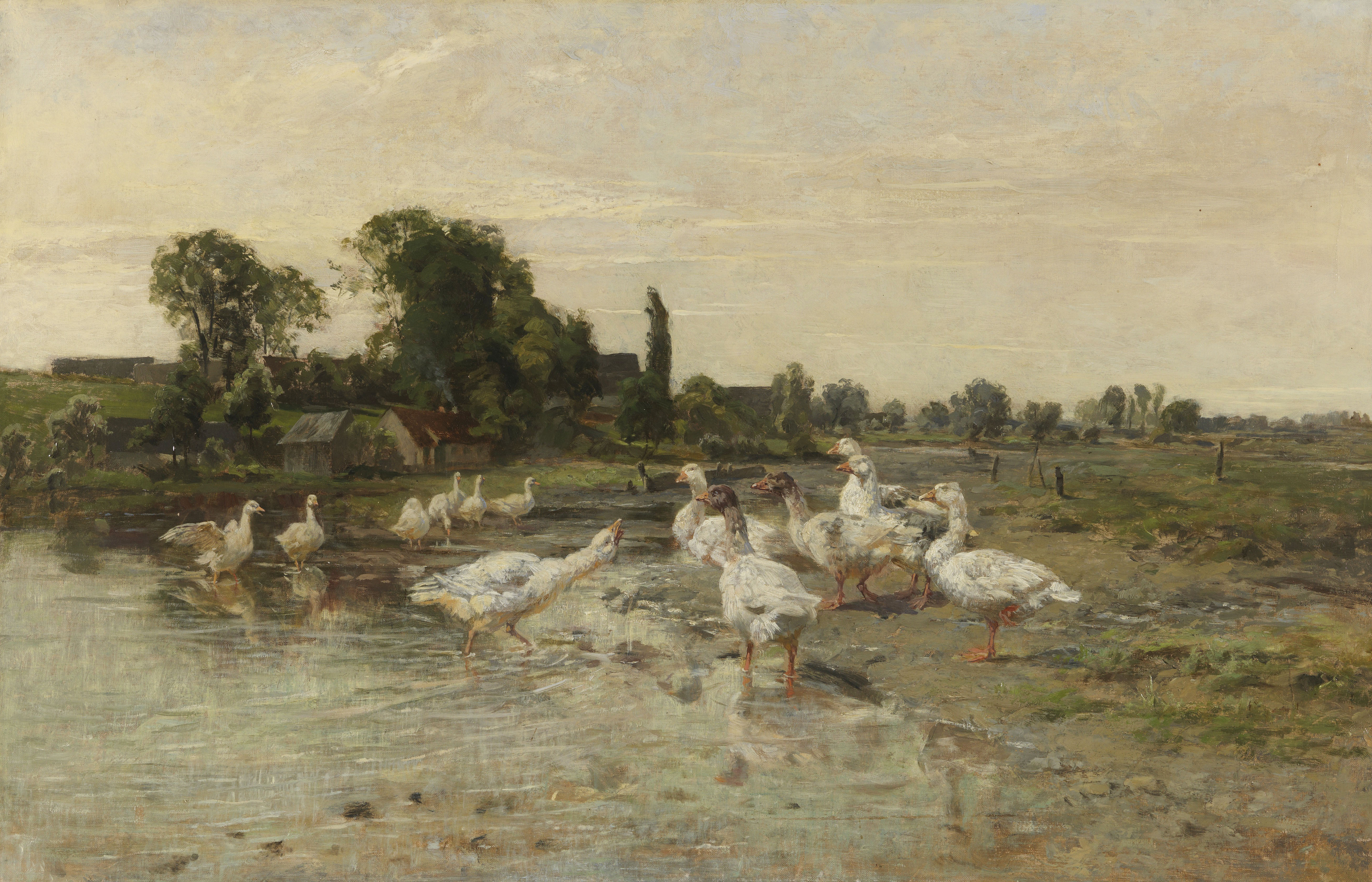
Geese at the Village Pond
