= Forschungsinstitut für Kraftfahrwesen und Fahrzeugmotoren Stuttgart =

German research institute

The Forschungsinstitut für Kraftfahrwesen und Fahrzeugmotoren Stuttgart (FKFS), (in English: Research Institute of Automotive Engineering and Vehicle Engines Stuttgart), is a private, nonprofit research and development institute for the automobile and supplier industry, focusing on vehicle technology, engine technology, and vehicle mechatronics.

It was established in 1930, and called the "Kamm-Institut" after its founder and long-time director, Wunibald Kamm.

At the institute, Dr. Kamm "built the first full-scale wind tunnel for motor vehicles."

The institute was rebuilt after being destroyed in World War II.
