= Bernhard von Neher =

German painter

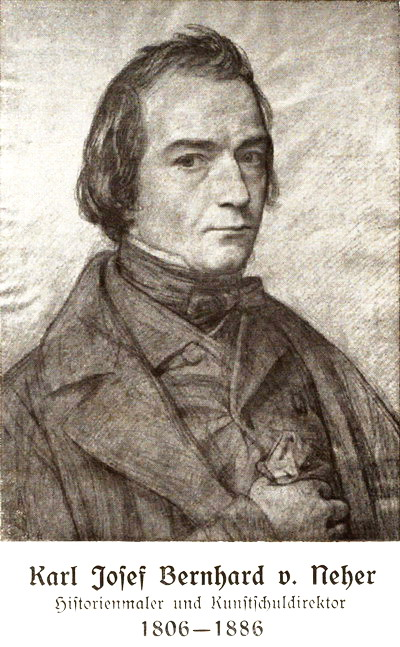
- Bernhard von Neher
- Born: January 16, 1806; Biberach an der Riß, Germany
- Died: January 17, 1886; Stuttgart, Germany
- Known for: Painting, frescoes
- Notable work: Panoramic fresco on the Isartor, Munich
- Movement: Nazarene movement

Karl Josef Bernhard von Neher (16 January 1806 – 17 January 1886) was a German painter.

== Life and work ==
Neher was born in Biberach an der Riß. He began to study painting in 1822 in Stuttgart, under Johann Heinrich von Dannecker und Philipp Friedrich von Hetsch, but received his primary instruction at the Academy of Fine Arts Munich with Peter von Cornelius. This was followed by four years in Rome, where he cultivated contacts with the Nazarene movement, led by Friedrich Overbeck und Philipp Veit. In 1832, he returned to Munich, where he painted the huge fresco that adorns the arch of the Isartor, depicting the triumphal entry of Emperor Louis after his victory at the Battle of Mühldorf.

In 1836 he was summoned to Weimar, to decorate two rooms of the Grand Ducal Palace with murals. He worked there, off and on, for eleven years. In 1841, he became Director of the Academy of Visual Arts in Leipzig. He was later induced to return to Stuttgart, where he became a Professor at the Royal Art School. He was promoted to Director in 1854, but continued to produce many large oil paintings, mostly on religious subjects.

Arguably, however, his best work involved a series of large glass paintings for stained-glass windows; six for the Stiftskirche, three for the chapel in the Old Castle and one each for the Leonhardskirche, the Greek Chapel in the New Castle and the Johanneskirche.

In 1852, he was awarded the Knight's Cross, First Class of the Order of the Crown (Württemberg), which conferred a title of nobility. In 1878, The Staatsgalerie Stuttgart acquired the frames and designs for his windows. He resigned his position as Director in 1879. He died in Stuttgart.

== Sources ==
- Ulrike Gauss, Kurt Löcher: Karl Joseph Bernhard von Neher 1806 - 1886 (Katalog u. Einf.), Aquarelle und Zeichnungen, 1971, Biberacher Verlagsdruckerei, Exhibition of 29 August - 3 October 1971
- Christian Hecht (1999). "Neher, Karl Joseph Bernhard v.". Neue Deutsche Biographie (in German). Vol. 19. Berlin: Duncker & Humblot. pp. 36–37. (full text online).
- August Wintterlin (1886). "Neher, Bernhard von" . Allgemeine Deutsche Biographie (in German). Vol. 23. Leipzig: Duncker & Humblot. pp. 381–387.
