= Vitrigraph =

Vitrigraph (from Latin: glass + painting or drawing) may refer to:

- Vitrigraph Pulling, a glass art term for pulling of molten glass from a kiln to make shapes such as spirals
- Vitrigraph, a pinball term for a patented photo-realistic mylar overlay for pinball playfields

== See also ==
- Vitreography, a printmaking technique that uses a float glass matrix
- Vitrography, laser etching of three-dimensional designs inside of glass or transparent plastic
