= Glossary of glass art terms =

A glossary of terms used in glass art

- Abrasion – the technique of grinding shallow decoration with a wheel or some other device. The decorated areas are left unpolished.
- Ale glass – a type of English drinking glass for ale or beer. Ale glasses, first made in the 17th century, have a tall and conical cup, a stem, and a foot. They may be enameled, engraved, or gilded with representations of hops or barley.
- At-the-fire – the process of reheating a blown glass object at the glory hole during manufacture, to permit further inflation, manipulation with tools, or fire polishing.
- Annealing – The process of slowly cooling a blown or cast object to prevent the stresses of rapid cooling from cracking or damaging the object.
- Battledore – a glassworker's tool in the form of a square wooden paddle with a handle. Battledores are used to smooth the bottoms of vessels and other objects.
- Blank – any cooled glass object that requires further forming or decoration to be finished.
- Blowpipe – a hollow steel rod, with a mouth piece on one end which the artist blows through to expand a bubble through the hot glass
- Caneworking – the use of cane or rods with color, either single or multiple (see also zanfirico/twisted cane)
- Glass casting – Any of several methods of forming glass in a mold, including the pouring of molten glass into a sand mold (sand casting) and the melting of glass cullet in a mold placed in a kiln (kiln casting).
- Cullet – broken chunks of glass or waste glass suitable for melting or remelting.
- Cut glass – cold decoration by cutting with an abrasive wheel.
- Engraving – shallow cold decoration with a sharp point or small wheel
- Flameworking – alternate name lampworking, the technique of forming glass, from rods and tubes, using a bench top or handheld heat source, formerly lamps, more often today a bench-mounted oxy/propane torch, to shape and form the glass by glassblowing and with the use of tongs, forceps, knives and other small tools. Borosilicate glass is the most common form of glass to be manipulated using this technique.
- Feathering – creating feather-like patterns on a glass by dragging a metal tool across the surface of a newly applied wrap.
- Frit – crushed glass often melted onto other glass to produce patterns and color
- Incalmo – the grafting or joining, while still hot, of two separately blown glass [bubbles] to produce a single [bubble].

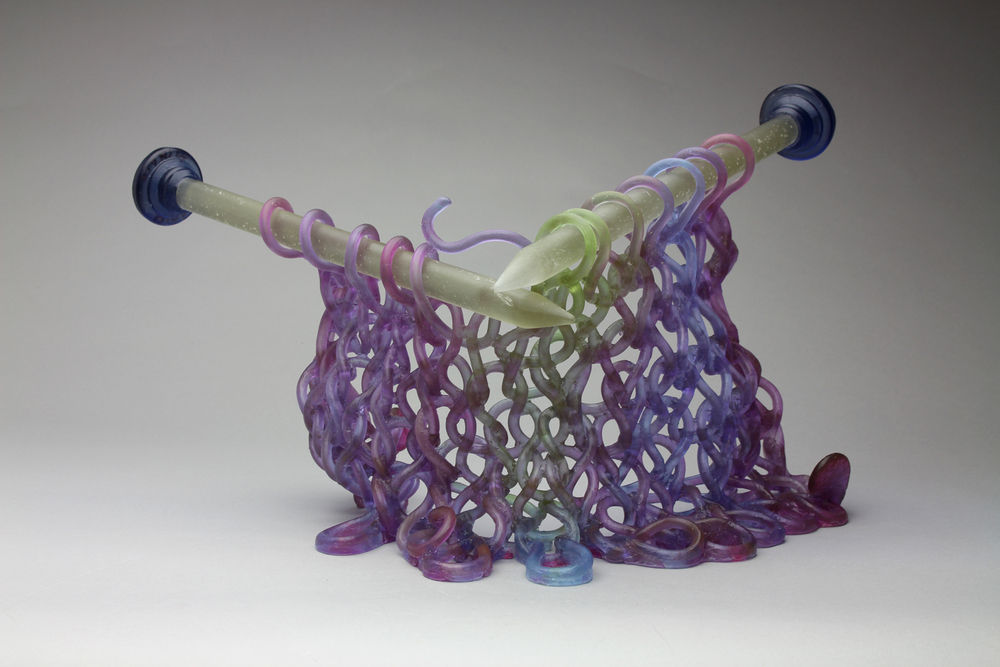
An example of knitted glass: Carol Milne's Purple Reigns.

- Knitted glass – incorporates the techniques of knitting, lost-wax casting, mold-making, and kiln-casting.
- Latticino – Italian decorative glassblowing technique. Latticino refers to any glass piece created using colored glass canes.
- Latticello – a decorative glassblowing technique. A latticello is a complicated design where the glass artist uses a latticino to create a reticello like pattern. Although the latticino and the reticello are both classic Italian techniques, the latticello is a modern-day twist on classic design.
- Lehr – a specialized, temperature-controlled kiln for annealing glass.
- Mandrel – metal rod used to construct a glass bead around. When cooled and removed, the space occupied by the mandrel creates the hole through the bead.
- Marver – a tool used in glassblowing A marver is a large flat table. The glass piece is rolled across its surface. It is used to not only shape the glass, but to remove heat as well. The rapid absorption of heat by the marver creates a stronger skin (surface tension) than the use of a wooden tool. Marver is derived from the word "marble." Marble was originally used in the construction of this specialized table. Modern marvers are made of steel, typically stainless steel. Lampworkers use small graphite marvers mounted on or near their torches.
- Millefiori – an Italian term (a thousand flowers) describing a style of murrine defined by internal patterns made by layering a number of colors and shaping each with an optic mold while molten. This style of murrine results in designs that are often flower-like.
- Murrine – Italian term for patterns or images made in a glass cane (long rods of glass) that are revealed when cut or chopped in cross-sections.
- Pate de verre – a paste of ground or crushed glass, and the technique of casting this material into a mold; also applied to a more general range of cast-glass objects.
- Prunt – a small blob of glass fused to a piece of glass, often impressed with a pattern or stamp
- Punty – occasionally pontil, a solid metal rod, around 5 feet long, used to hold an object being blown or hot-worked after it is removed from the blowpipe.
- Reticello – Italian decorative glassblowing technique. This involves the merging of two cane bubbles (one inside the other) in which the straight canes were twisted in opposite directions. Once merged, the opposingly twisted canes cross each other creating a net like pattern. If done the traditional way, small air bubbles will be trapped in a grid pattern between the crossing canes.
- Rod – a rod of glass used as a raw material in forming and fusing glass
- Studio glass – artistic glass made by an individual or small workshop.
- Twisty cane – a cane formed out of different coloured glass twisted together - also known as zanfirico cane
- Vitreography (art form) – a style of contained 3-dimensional scenes displayed in a shadow box frame.
- Vitreography (printing technique) – use of a 3/8-inch-thick (9.5 mm) float glass matrix instead of the traditional matrices of metal, wood or stone.
- Vitrigraph pulling – pulling molten glass strings from a wall mounted kiln—called a vitrigraph kiln— usually into shapes such as spirals.

- Zanfirico – Italian decorative glassblowing technique involving intricate patterns of colored glass canes arranged and twisted to comprise a pattern within a new single glass cane. These new patterned canes are then used to create a glass work. A synonym for zanfirico is vetro a retorti
