= Kait Rhoads =

American glass artist

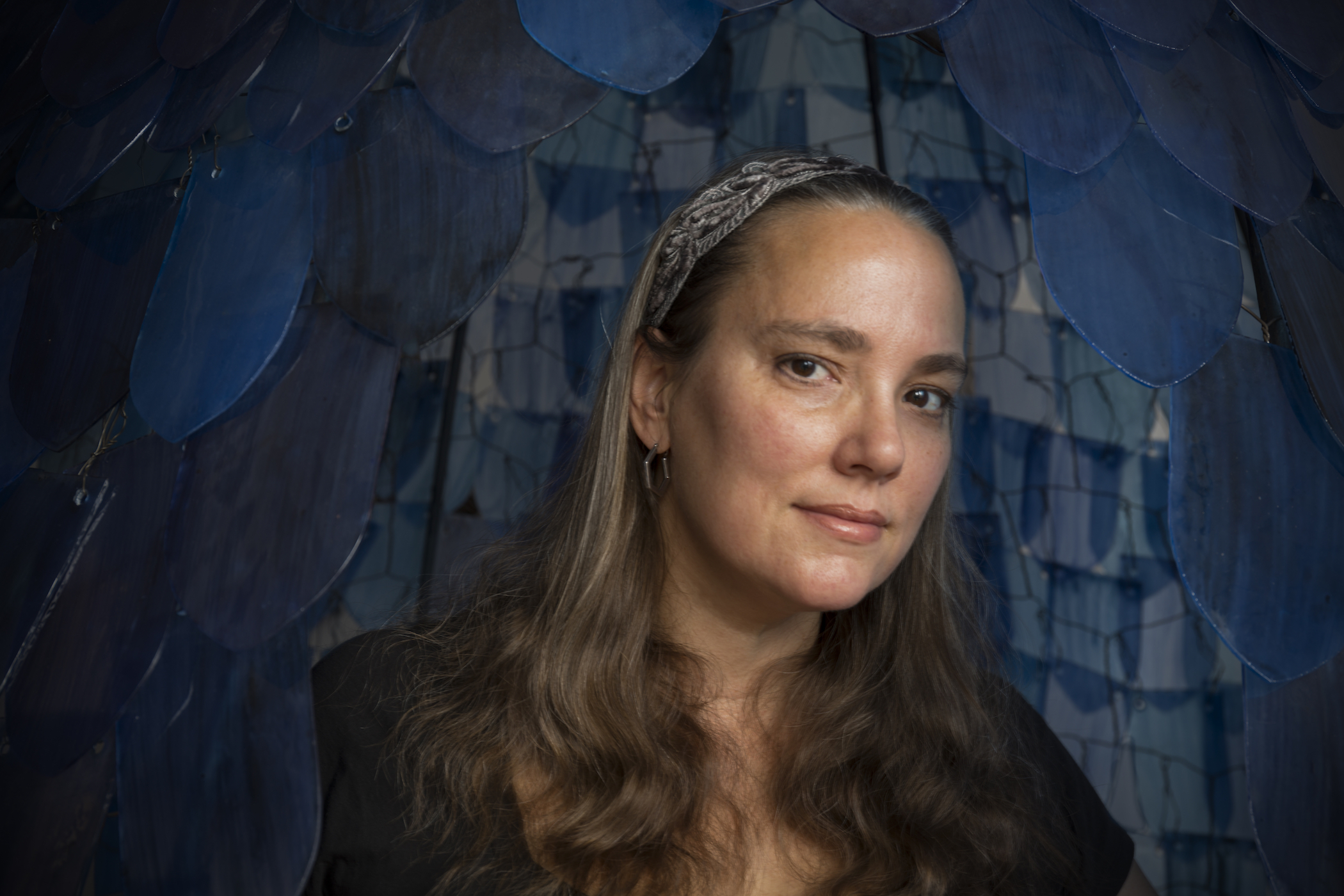
Kait Rhoads with her work, "Blue Dome", 2018

Kait Rhoads (born 1968) is an American glass artist. Her work incorporates traditional Italian glassmaking techniques, including murrine and filigrana, in the creation of sculpture, vessels, jewelry, and public art. Her practice draws on marine and aquatic forms, reflecting an interest in ocean environments shaped in part by her childhood experiences in the Caribbean. Based in the Pacific Northwest, her work also engages with coastal ecosystems such as kelp forests.

== Early life and education ==
Rhoads was born in 1968. She spent part of her childhood in the Bahamas and the Caribbean, an experience that informed her later interest in marine environments.

She received an Atrium Baccalaureate in Creative Arts from Rollins College in 1989, a Bachelor of Fine Arts in glass from the Rhode Island School of Design in 1993, and a Master of Fine Arts in glass from the New York State College of Ceramics at Alfred University in 2001.

== Career ==
Rhoads has taught at Pilchuck Glass School in Stanwood, Washington, and the Penland School of Craft in Penland, North Carolina. She was an artist-in-residence at the Corning Museum of Glass in April 2008. Her work has been exhibited in venues including the Morean Arts Center's Chihuly Collection in 2014.

== Artistic style ==
Rhoads' work is influenced by natural forms, especially marine and aquatic subjects, and incorporates environmental themes. She is known for her use of Venetian glass techniques, including murrine and filigrana, applied to both sculptural forms and vessels. Her work often incorporates hollow glass canes combined with metal elements to create flexible, organic structures that reference biological forms and growth patterns.

== Public collections ==
Rhoads's work is held in public collections including the Carnegie Museum of Art, the Museum of Glass, Tacoma, the Seattle Art Museum, the Tacoma Art Museum, and the Shanghai Museum of Glass.

== Awards and honors ==
Rhoads has received a Fulbright Scholarship for study in Venice, Italy (2001–2002), a residency at the Corning Museum of Glass (2008), and the Hauberg Residency at Pilchuck Glass School (2014). She has also received the Doug and Dale Anderson Scholarship and the Anne Gould Hauberg Award. In 2018, she completed a commissioned installation titled Salish Nettles for the Pacific Seas Aquarium in Tacoma, consisting of large-scale glass sculptures.
