= Caneworking =

Glassblowing technique for making glass rods with several colored patterns

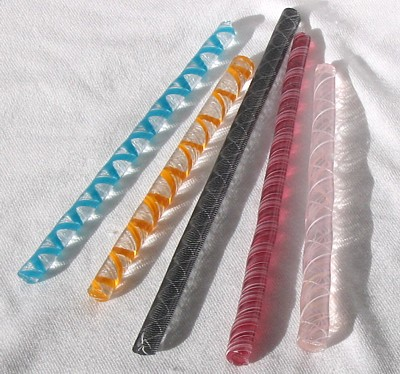
Hand-pulled and twisted complex glass canes

In glassblowing, cane refers to rods of glass with color; these rods can be simple, containing a single color, or they can be complex and contain strands of one or several colors in pattern. Caneworking refers to the process of making cane, and also to the use of pieces of cane, lengthwise, in the blowing process to add intricate, often spiral, patterns and stripes to vessels or other blown glass objects. Cane is also used to make murrine (singular murrina, sometimes called mosaic glass), thin discs cut from the cane in cross-section that are also added to blown or hot-worked objects. A particular form of murrine glasswork is millefiori ("thousand flowers"), in which many murrine with a flower-like or star-shaped cross-section are included in a blown glass piece.

Caneworking is an ancient technique, first invented in southern Italy in the second half of the third century BC, and elaborately developed centuries later on the Italian island of Murano.

== Making cane ==
There are several different methods of making cane. In each, the fundamental technique is the same: a lump of glass, often containing some pattern of colored and clear glass, is heated in a furnace (glory hole) and then pulled, by means of a long metal rod (punty) attached at each end. As the glass is stretched out, it retains whatever cross-sectional pattern was in the original lump, but narrows quite uniformly along its length (due to the skill of the glassblowers doing the pulling, aided by the fact that if the glass becomes narrower at some point along the length, it cools more there and thus becomes stiffer). Cane is usually pulled until it reaches roughly the diameter of a pencil, (Note: This diameter is small enough that the finished cane can be broken into short lengths or into murrine without a cutting tool, and it is convenient for picking up on a blowpipe. Contemporary glass artists sometimes use cane of larger diameter to make large murrine, which must be cut from the cane with a diamond saw.) when, depending on the size of the original lump, it may be anywhere from one to fifty feet in length. After cooling, it is broken into sections usually from four to six inches long, which can then be used in making more complex canes or in other glassblowing techniques.

The simplest cane, called vetro a fili (glass with threads) is clear glass with one or more threads of colored (often white) glass running its length. It is commonly made by heating and shaping a chunk of clear, white, or colored glass on the end of a punty, and then gathering molten clear glass over the color by dipping the punty in a furnace containing the clear glass. After the desired amount of clear glass is surrounding the color, this cylinder of hot glass is then shaped, cooled and heated until uniform in shape and temperature. Simultaneously an assistant prepares a 'post' which is another punty with a small platform of clear glass on the end. The post is pressed against the end of the hot cylinder of glass to connect them, and the glassblower (or 'gaffer') and assistant walk away from each other with the punties, until the cane is stretched to the desired length and diameter. The cane cools within minutes and is cut into small sections.

== Variations in cane making ==
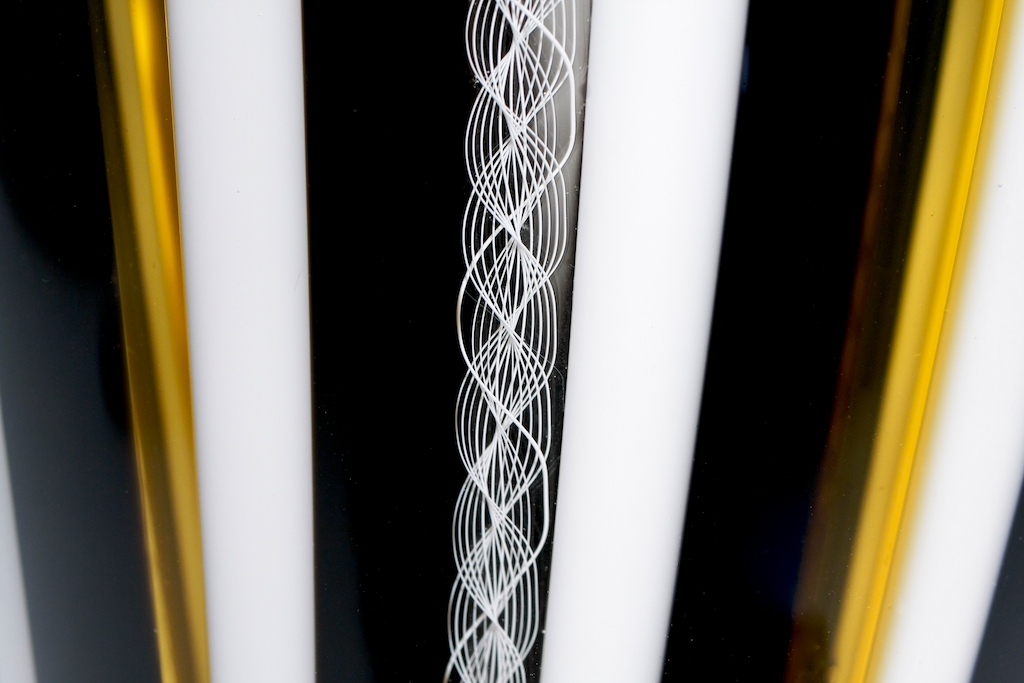
Close-up of ballotini cane forming a part of a blown vessel

A simple single-thread cane can then be used to make more complex canes. A small bundle of single-thread canes can be heated until they fuse, or heated canes, laid parallel, can be picked up on the circumference of a hot cylinder of clear or colored glass. This bundle, treated just as the chunk of color in the description above, is cased in clear glass and pulled out, forming a vetro a fili cane with multiple threads and perhaps a clear or solid color core. If the cane is twisted as it is pulled, the threads take a spiral shape called vetro a retorti (twisted glass) or zanfirico.

Ballotini is a cane technique in which several vetro a fili canes are picked up while laid side-by-side rather than a bundle, with a clear glass gather over them. This gather is shaped into a cylinder with the canes directed along the axis, so that the canes form a sort of "fence" across the diameter of the cylinder. When this is simultaneously twisted and pulled, the resulting cane has a helix of threads across its thickness.

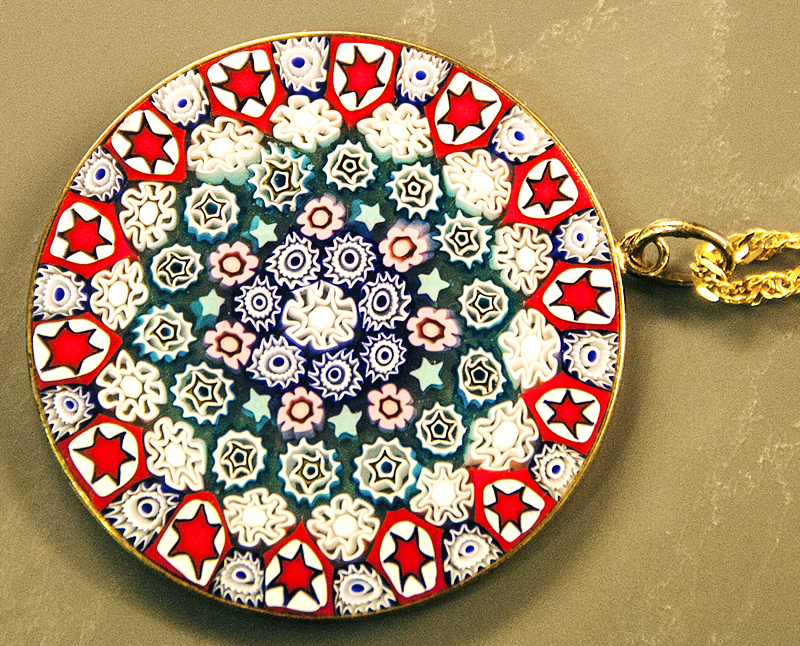
A small - 1 1/2 in (38 mm) - disc of millefiori-patterned glass. Each of the stars and flowers is a cross-section of a cane

Another technique for forming cane is to use optic molds to make more complex cross sections. An optic mold is an open-ended cone-shaped mold with some sort of lobed or star shape around its inside circumference. When a gather or partially blown bubble is forced into the mold, its outside takes the shape of the mold. Canes with complicated, multi-colored patterns are formed by placing layers of different or alternating colors over a solid-color core, using various optic molds on the layers as they are built. Because the outer layers are hotter than those inside when the molds are used, the mold shape is impressed into the outer color without deforming the inner shapes. Canes made in this way are used in making millefiori. Discs from eight different canes have been used to make the pendant in the photo.

Finally, flameworkers sometimes make cane by building up the cross-section using ordinary flameworking or bead making techniques. This permits very subtle gradations of color and shading, and is the way murrine portraits are usually made.

== Cane use ==
The generic term for blown glass made using canes in the lengthwise direction is filigrano (filigree glass), as contrasted with murrine when the canes are sliced and used in cross-section. (An older term is latticino, which has fallen into disuse).

One way glassblowers incorporate cane into their work is to line up canes on a steel or ceramic plate and heat them slowly to avoid cracking. When the surfaces of the canes just begin to melt, the canes adhere to each other. The tip of a glassblowing pipe (blowpipe) is covered with a 'collar' of clear molten glass, and touched to one corner of the aligned canes. The tip of the blowpipe is then rolled along the bottom of the canes, which stick to the collar, aligned cylindrically around the edge of the blowpipe. They are heated further until soft enough to shape. The cylinder of canes is sealed at the bottom with jacks and tweezers, to form the beginning of a bubble. The bubble is then blown using traditional glassblowing techniques.

Cane can also be incorporated in larger blown glass work by picking it up on a bubble of molten clear glass. This technique involves the gaffer creating a bubble from molten clear glass while an assistant heats the pattern of cane. When the cane design is fused and at the correct temperature and the bubble is exactly the correct size and temperature, the bubble is rolled over the cane pattern, which sticks to the hot glass. The bubble must be the right size and temperature for the pattern to cover it fully without any gaps or trapping air. Once the canes have been picked up, the bubble can be further heated, blown, and smoothed and shaped on the marver to give whatever final shape the glassblower wishes, with an embedded lacy pattern from the canes. Twisting the object as it is being shaped imparts a spiral shape to the overall pattern.

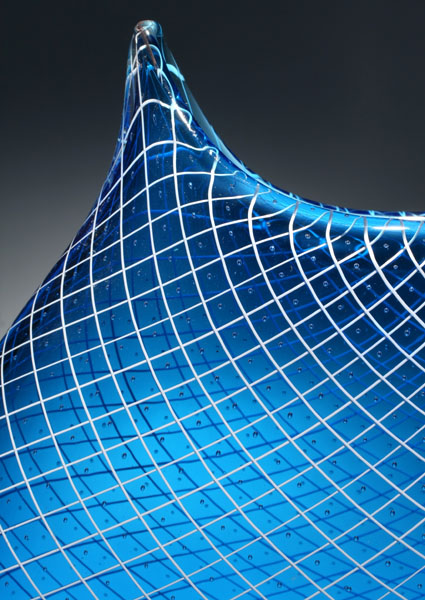
Close-up of reticello vessel blown by artist David Patchen

The classical reticello pattern is a small uniform mesh of white threads in clear glass, with a tiny air bubble in every mesh rectangle. To make an object in this pattern, the glassblower first uses white single-thread vetro a fili canes to blow a cylindrical cup shape, twisting as he forms it so the canes are in a spiral, and using care not to totally smooth the inside ribbing that remains from the canes. Setting this cup aside (usually keeping it warm in a furnace, below its softening point), he then makes another closed cylinder in the same pattern, but twisted in the opposite direction, and retaining some of the ribbing on the cylinder's outside. When this cylinder is the right size, the glassblower plunges it into the warm cup, without touching any of the sides until it is inserted all the way. Air is trapped in the spaces between the ribs of the two pieces, forming the uniformly spaced air bubbles. The piece may then be blown out and shaped as desired. The term reticello is often loosely applied to any criss-cross pattern, whether vetro a fili or vetro a retorti , white or colored, and with or without air bubbles.

See Murrine and Millefiori for information about these techniques.

== Additional canework images ==
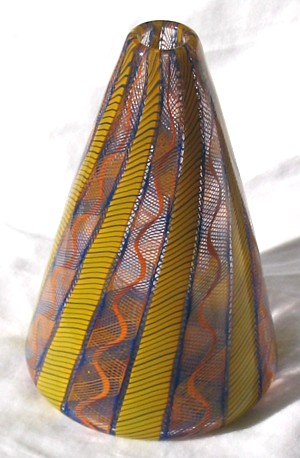
Traditional canework

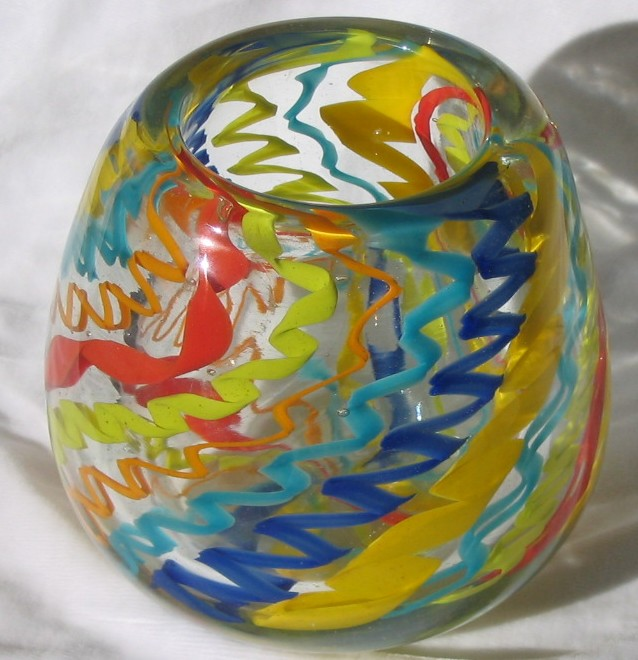
Contemporary canework

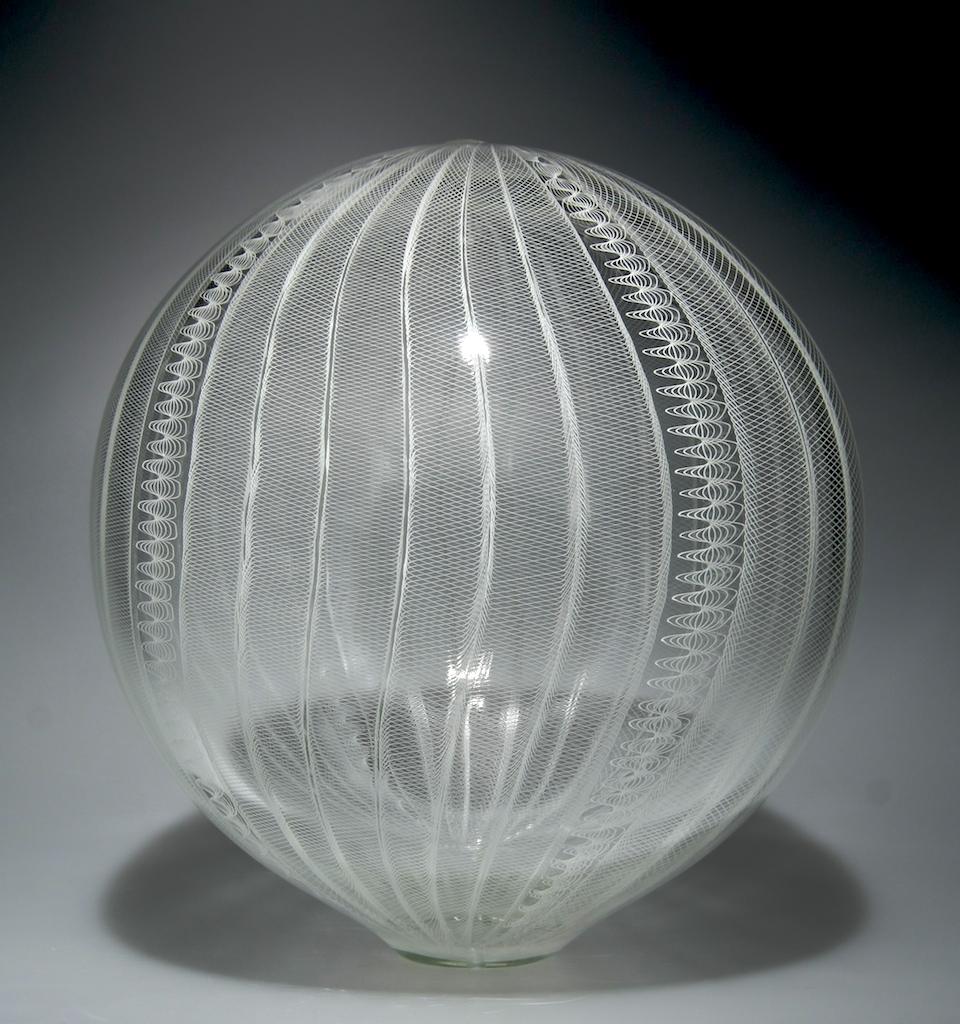
Ballotini and zanfirico canework by David Patchen

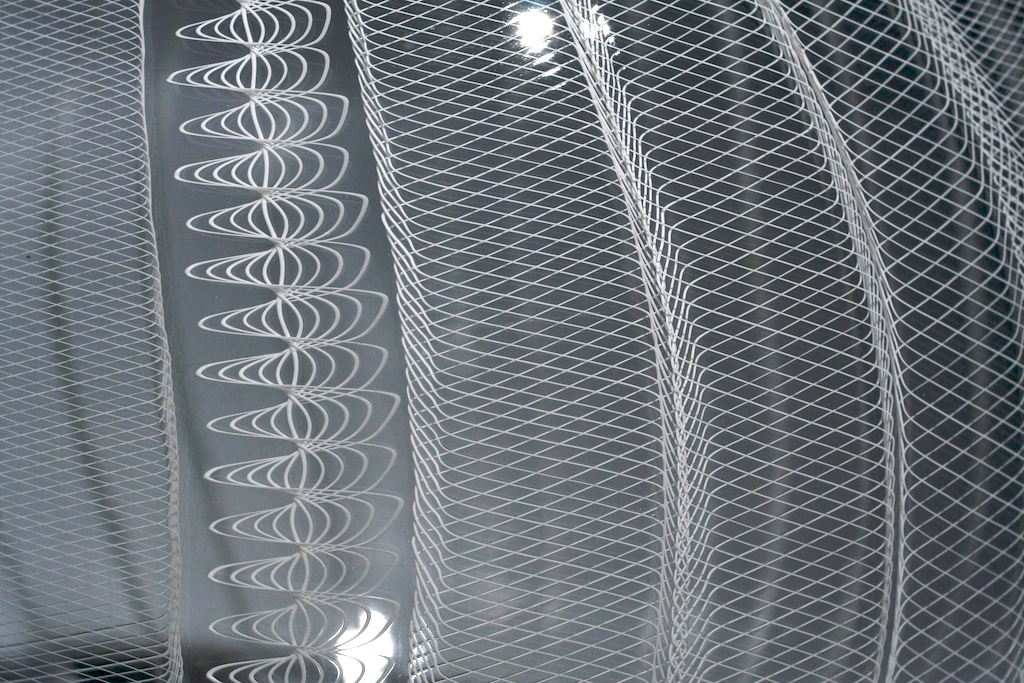
Close-up of combined ballotini and zanfirico cane

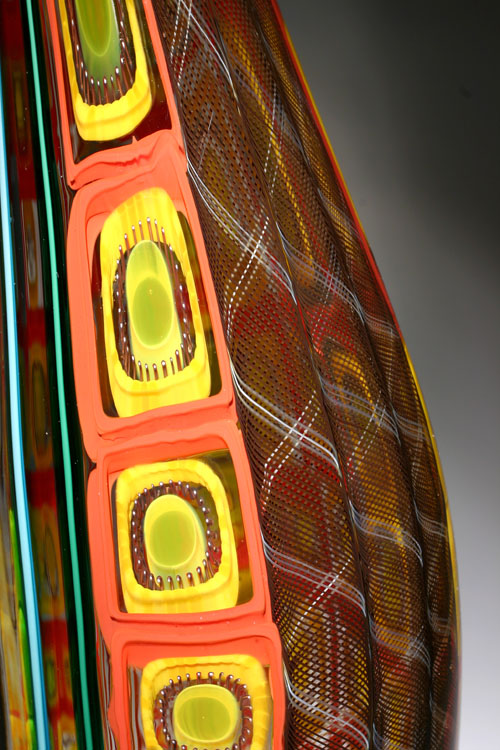
Zanfirico cane next to a murrine pattern

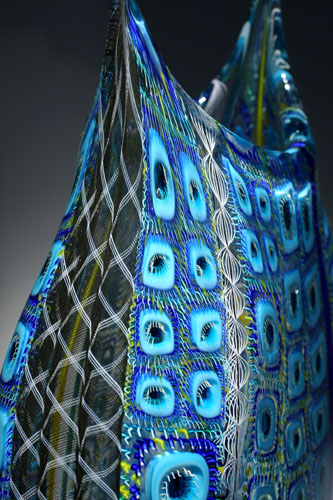
Ballotini, zanfirico and murrine

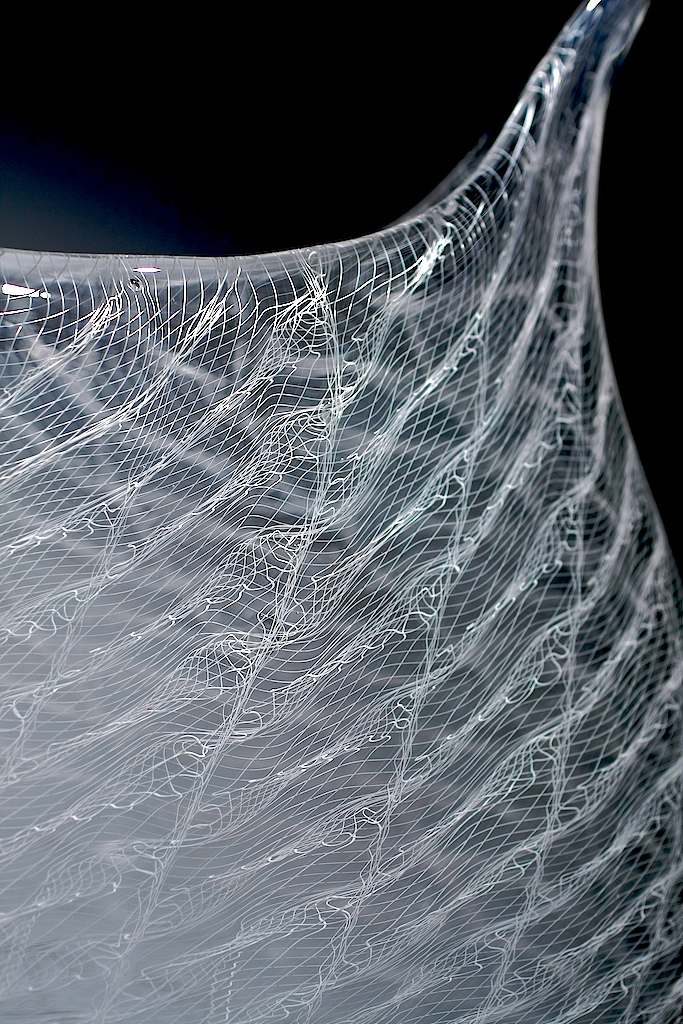
A merletto pattern

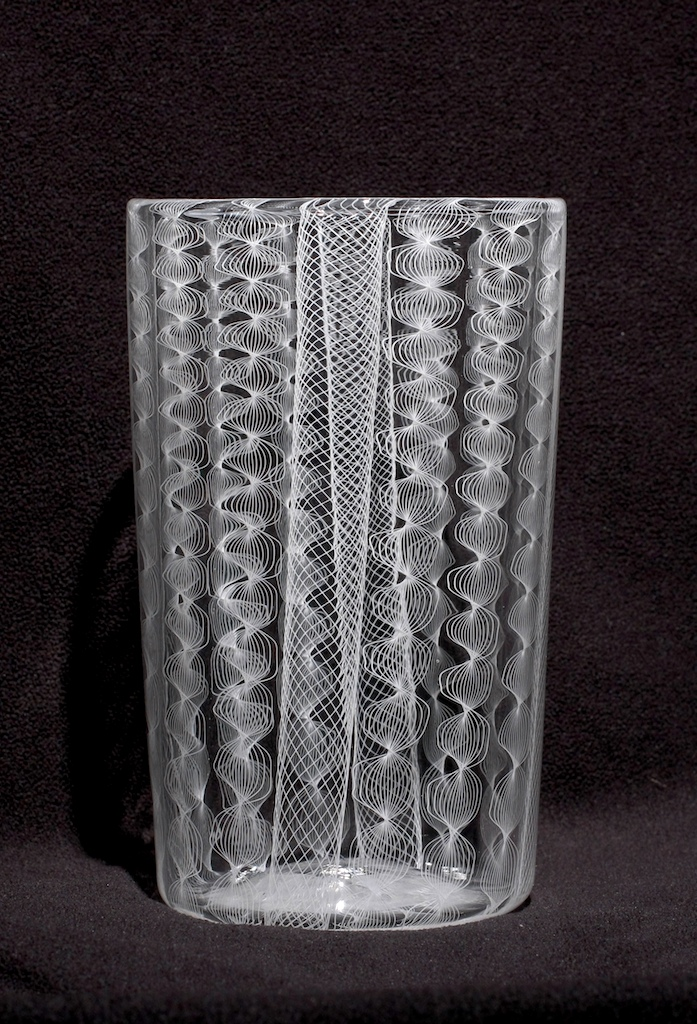
Functional glassware with ballotini and zanfirico cane

== See also ==
- Glass art
- Studio glass
