= Murrine =

Colored patterns made in glass

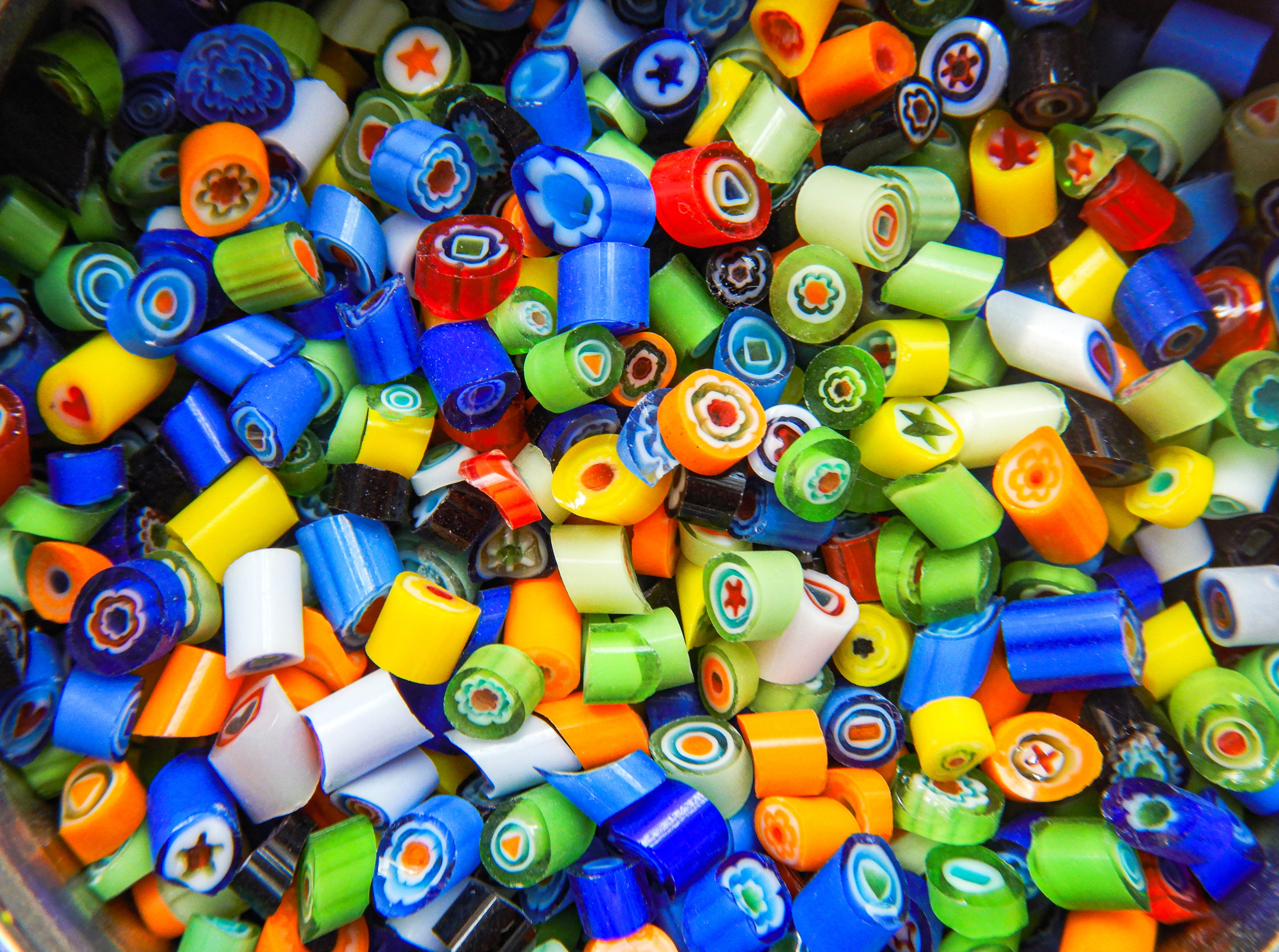
Various patterns of murrine

Murrine (singular: murrina) are colored patterns or images made in a glass cane that are revealed when the cane is cut into thin cross-sections. Murrine can be made in infinite designs from simple circular or square patterns to complex detailed designs and even portraits. One familiar style is the flower or star shape. When large numbers of murrine with a flower-like pattern are used to decorate a glass object, the result is called millefiori (an Italian word which translates literally to "a thousand flowers.")

== History ==
See: Millefiori § History

Murrine production first appeared in the Middle East more than 4,000 years ago. The term murrina (myrrhina in Latin) first appears in print in Pliny the Elder's Naturalis Historia. The craft was revived by Venetian glassmakers on Murano in the early 16th century. Many of the surviving pieces of millefiori are of very small size, leading some historians to suggest that their purpose was decorative rather than functional.

== Technique ==
A murrina cane is created by gathering molten glass at the end of a rod and rolling it across a marver (steel table) to create a glass core. This may be dipped into a mold to create a pattern. After the core has cooled, a different color of glass can be applied and distributed evenly by rolling the coated core on the marver, forming concentric layers. This is continued until the desired pattern is achieved. The final layer is not molded, resulting in a cylindrical cane. Multiple canes can be bundled and fused together to create a more complex pattern.

Once murrine have been made, they can be incorporated into a glass vessel or sculpture in several ways. A number of murrine may be scattered, more or less randomly, on a marver (steel table) and then picked up on the surface of a partially-blown glass bubble. Further blowing, heating, and shaping on the marver will incorporate the murrine completely into the bubble, creating a random arrangement of murrine in the vessel or sculpture being blown.

Alternatively, the murrine can be arranged in a compact pattern on a ceramic plate and then heated in a furnace until they fuse into a single sheet. The sheet can be formed over a mold (such as an inverted bowl shape) and further heated so that the murrine are slumped to take the desired form.

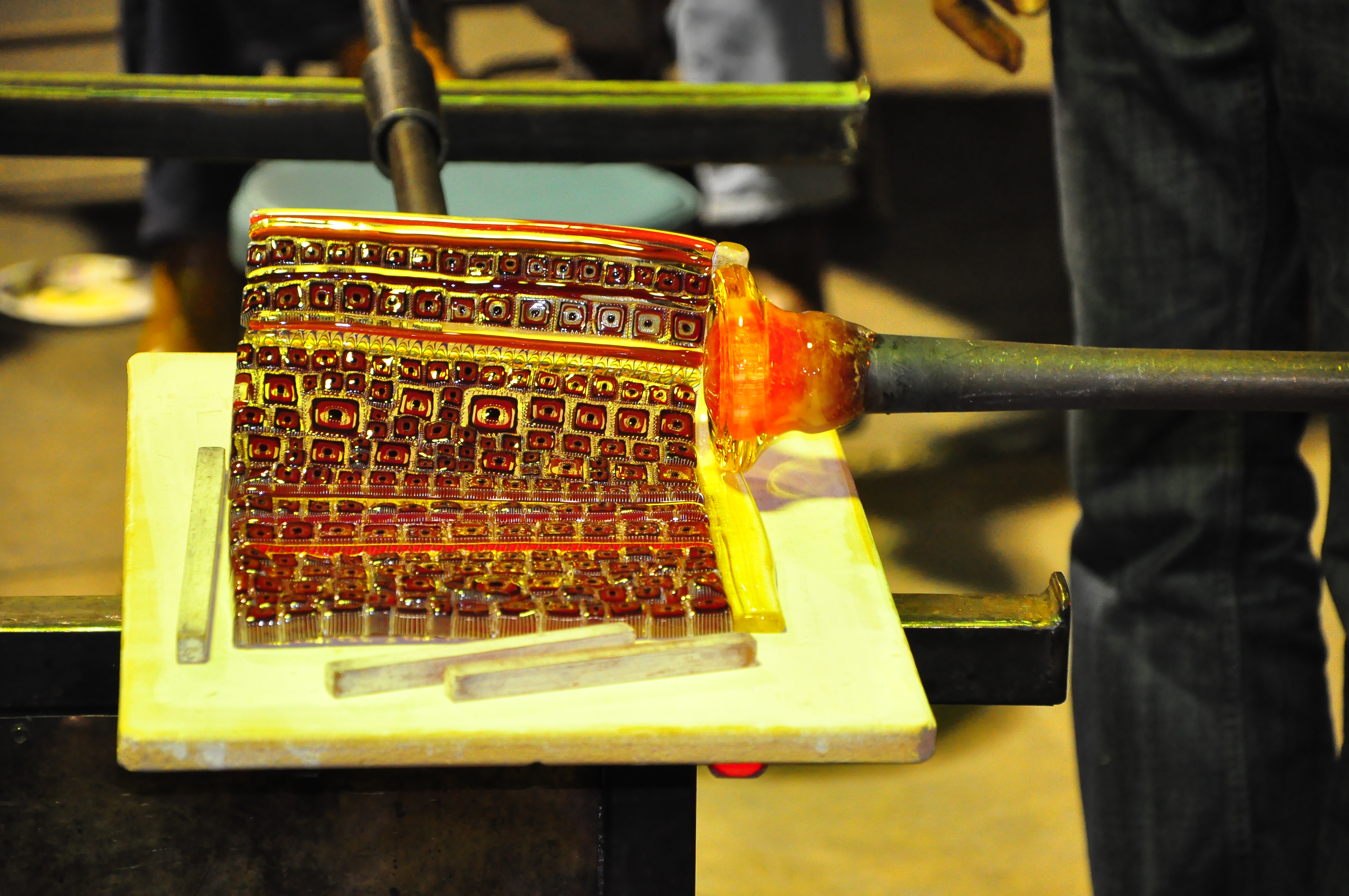
Picking up a murrina sheet onto a blowpipe while blowing glass.

Another technique using a sheet of murrine made as above is to make a small disc (collar) of molten glass on the end of a blowpipe, and then roll the disc along one edge of the sheet, picking up the sheet on the blowpipe in the form of a cylinder. The end of the cylinder opposite the blowpipe can be squeezed together and sealed. With further heating, the sealed cylinder can be blown and formed into any shape a glassblower can make.

== Notable practitioners ==
Many notable glass artists regularly use murrine in their work. These include:

- Dante Marioni
- Richard Marquis
- Stephen Rolfe Powell
- Richard Ritter
- Kait Rhoads
- Lino Tagliapietra

== Examples of pottery incorporating murrine ==
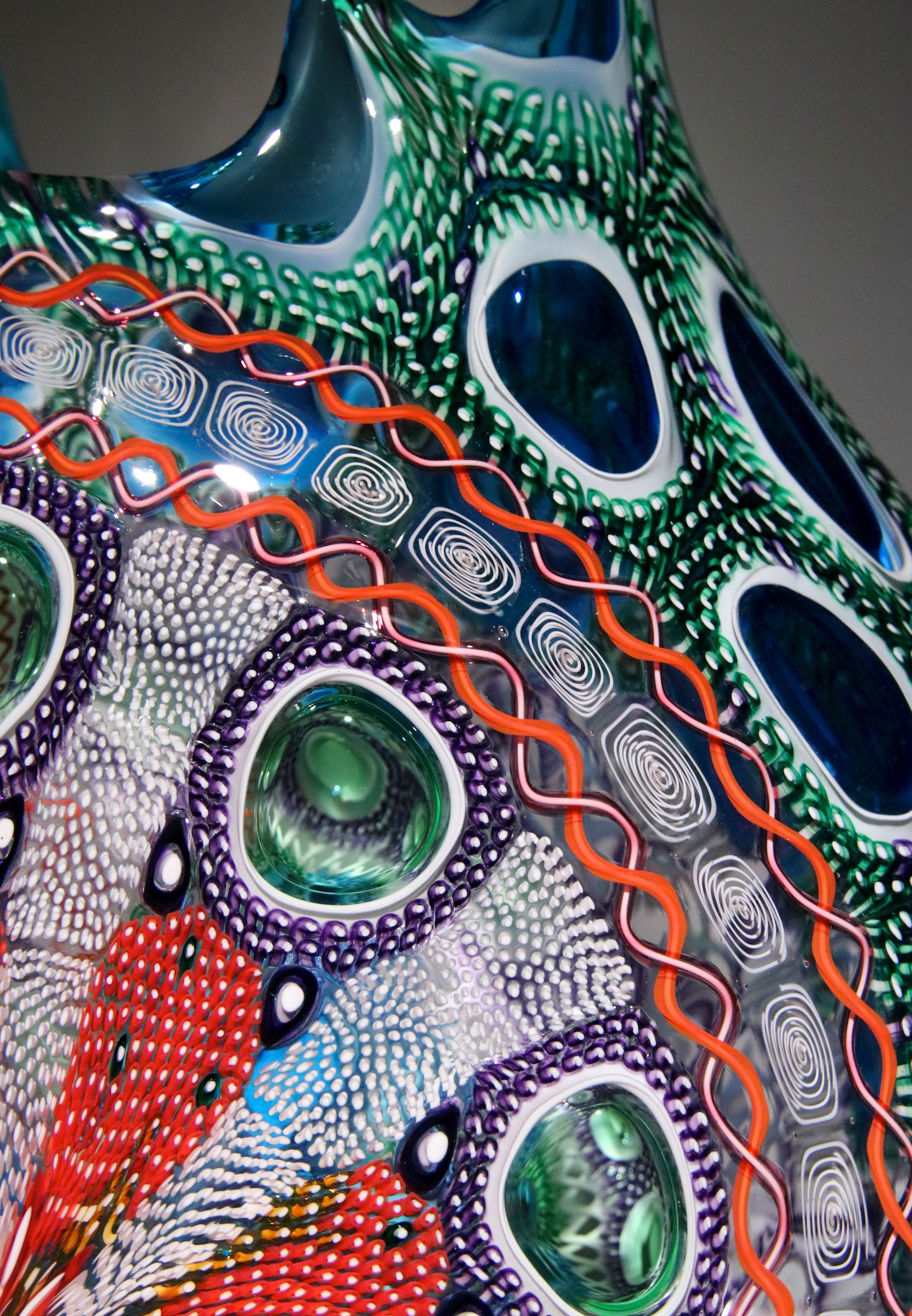
Murrine work by artist David Patchen

An example of simple murrine in a vessel by David Patchen.

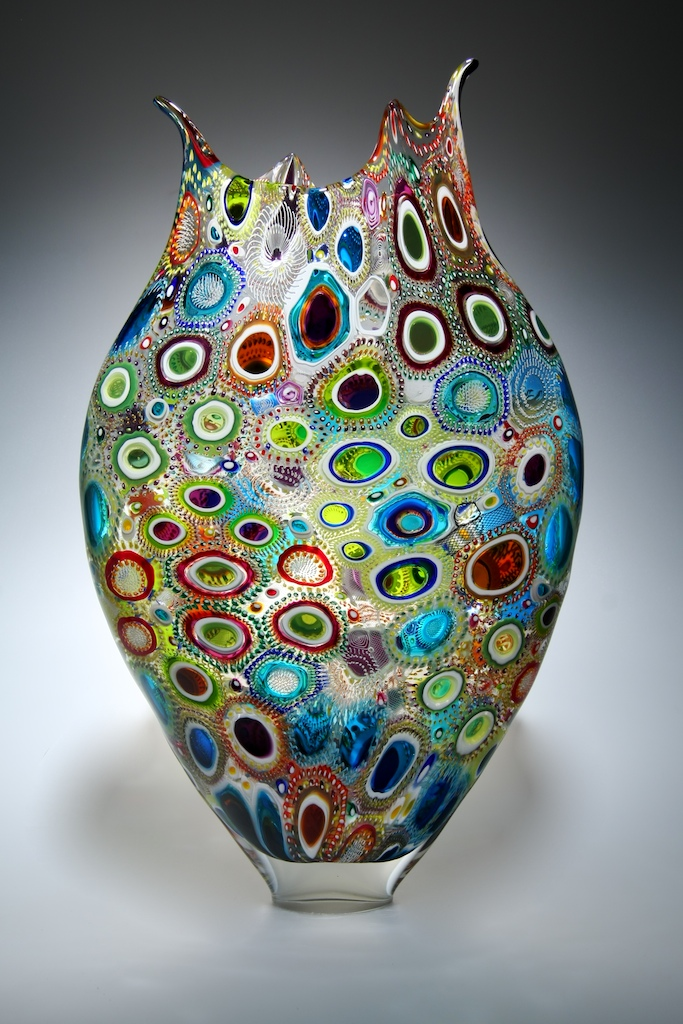
A random pattern of different murrine incorporated into blown glass by David Patchen.

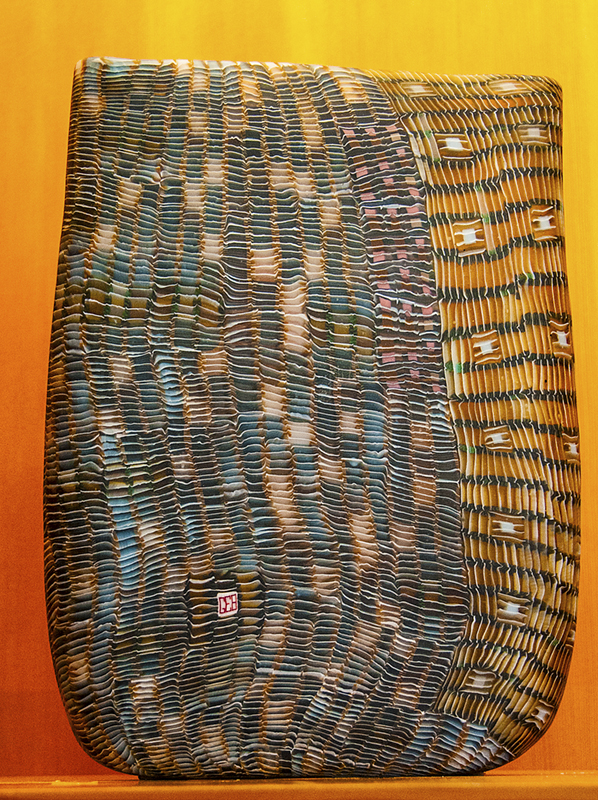
A murrine vessel by artist Giles Bettison. Approximately 8" x 5" x 1 1/2"

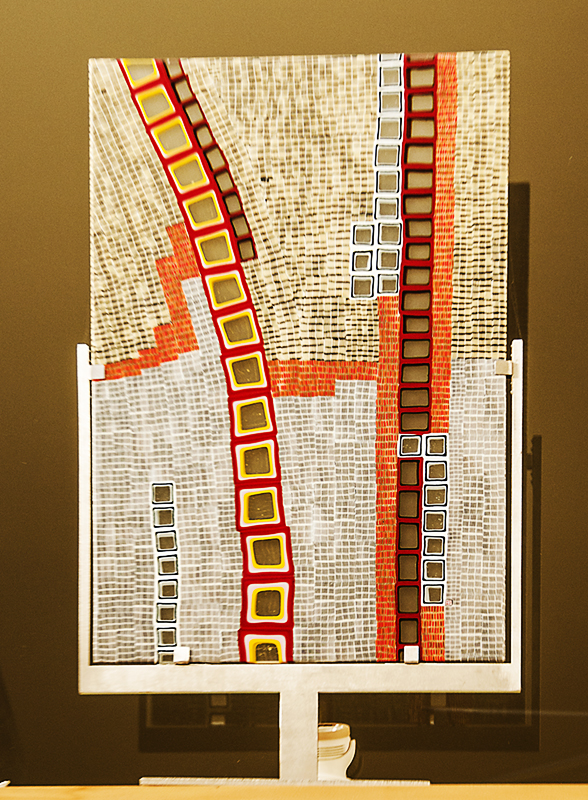
A murrine glass panel by artist Giles Bettison. Approximately 30" x 18"

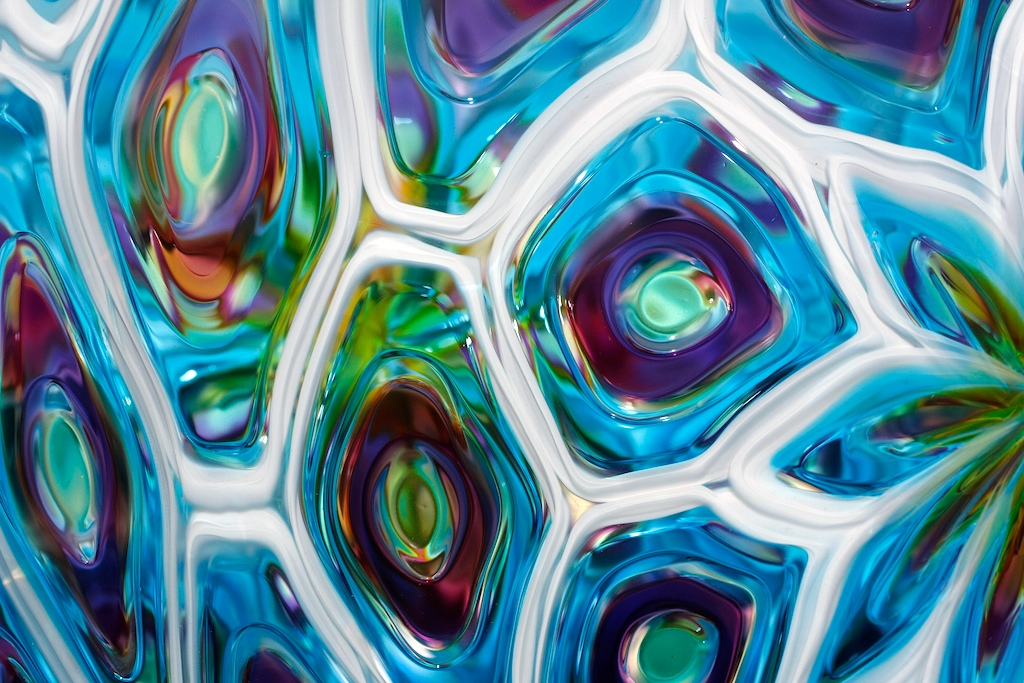
Close-up of transparent murrine incorporated into a vessel by David Patchen.

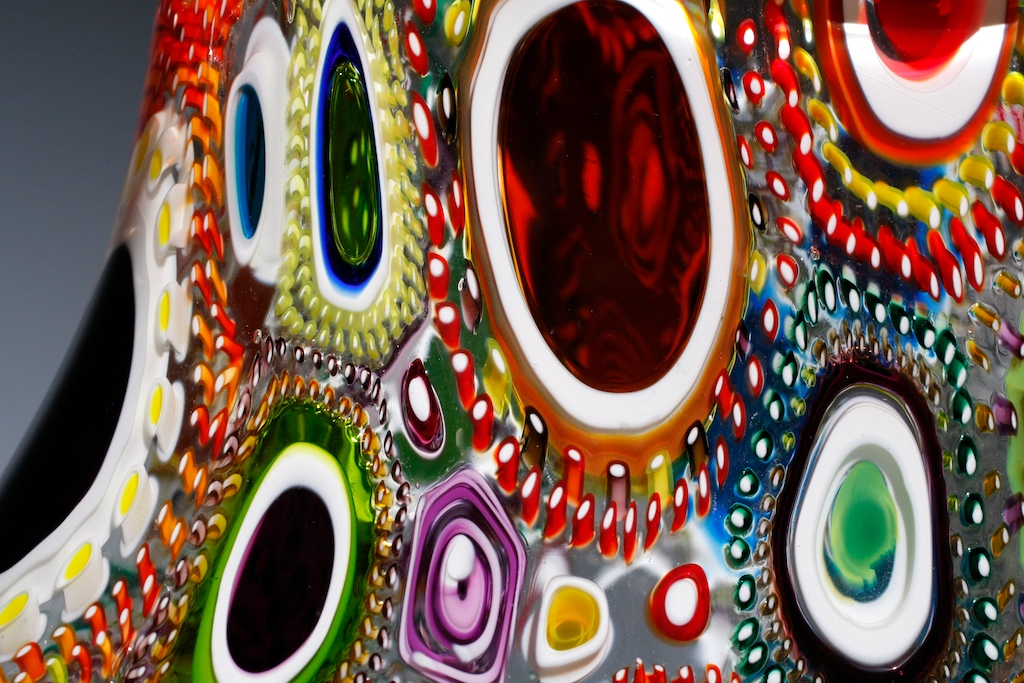
Close up of pattern of different murrine incorporated into blown glass.

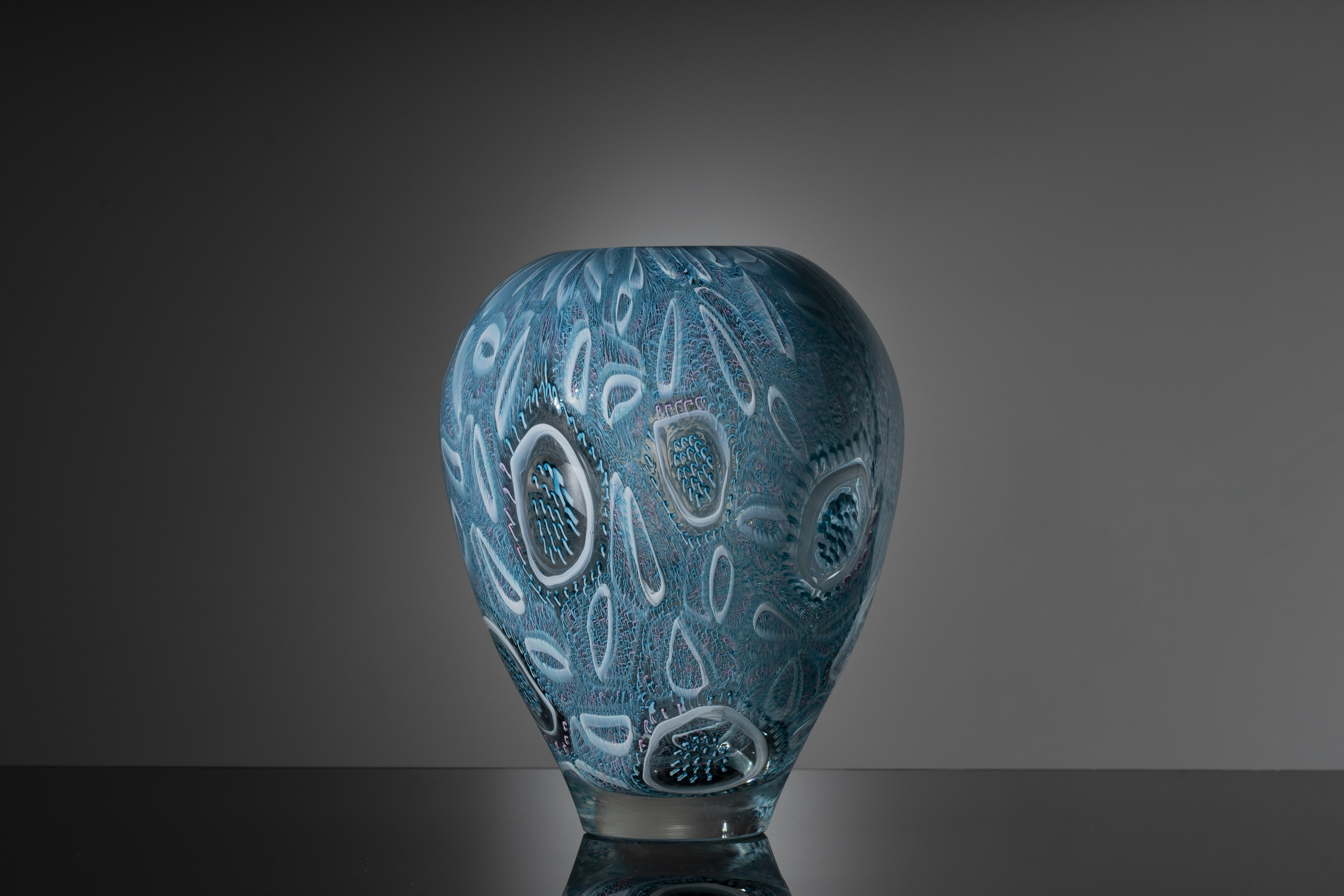
Blue murrine pattern used for a glass vase by Eli Crystal

== See also ==
- Caneworking
- Glassblowing
- Glass art
- Millefiori
