= Stolpersteine in Prague-Žižkov =

Memorial installations in Czech Republic

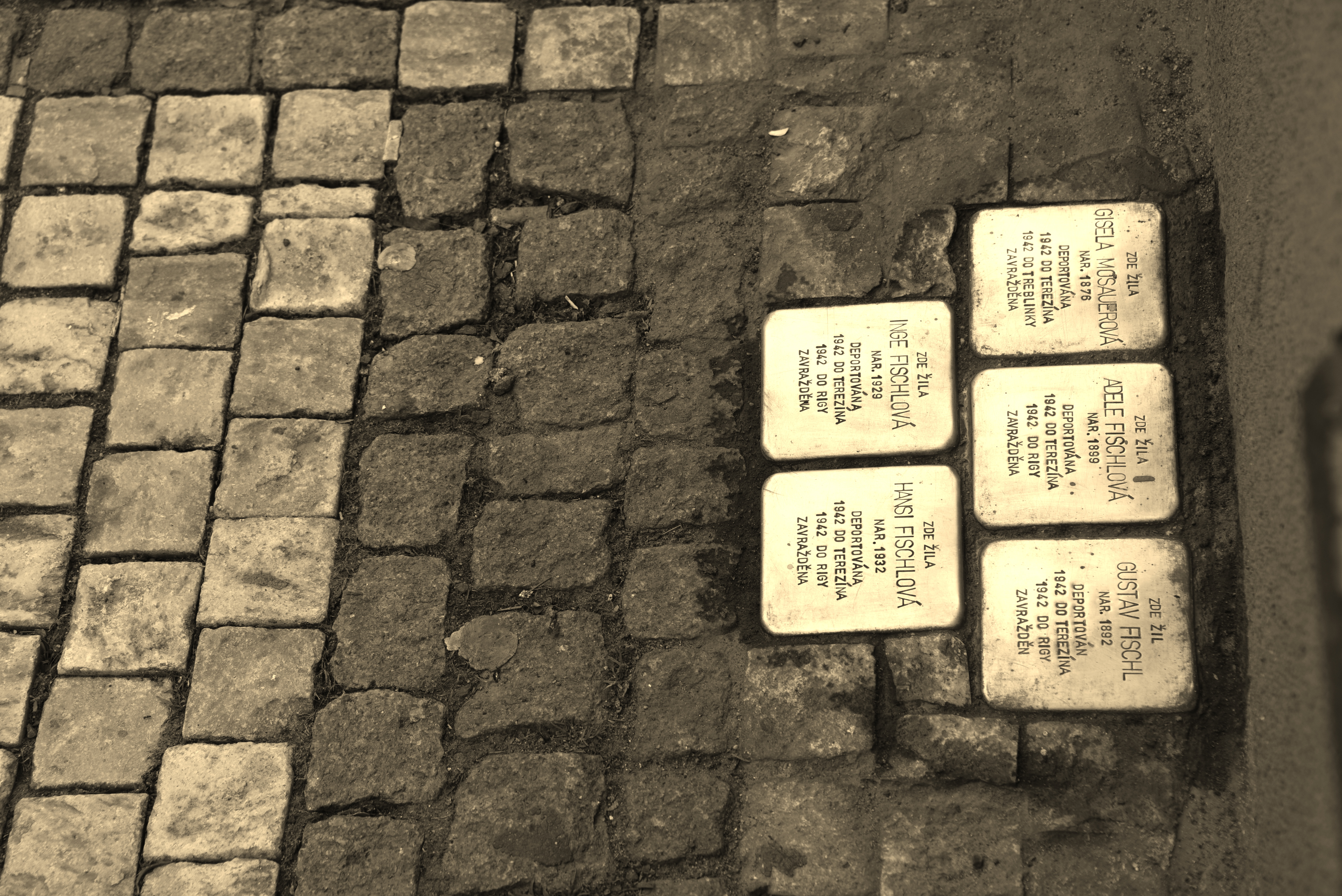
Stolpersteine for family Fischl in Prague-Žižkov

This article lists the Stolpersteine in a cadastral district Žižkov of Prague. The district has been split off. Since 2002 it belongs mainly to Praha 3, but smaller parts belong to Praha 8 and Praha 10. The district is named after Hussite military leader Jan Žižka. Stolpersteine is the German name for stumbling blocks collocated all over Europe by German artist Gunter Demnig. They remember the fate of the Nazi victims being murdered, deported, exiled or driven to suicide.

Generally, the stumbling blocks are posed in front of the building where the victims had their last self chosen residence. The name of the Stolpersteine in Czech is: Kameny zmizelých, stones of the disappeared.

== Žižkov ==
Stone	Inscription	Location	Life and death
	HERE LIVED; DR. RER. NAT. JIŘÍ BAUM; BORN 1900; DEPORTED 1943; TO WARSCHAU; MURDERED 1944; IBIDEM	Premyslovská 1939/28; 50.078503°N 14.457203°E	Jiří Baum Jiří Baum was born on 20 September 1900 in Prague. At the request of his parents he first studied Economics. He continued his studies at the Faculty of Science of the Charles University and graduated in 1928 with a doctorate. He became a zoologist, museum curator, explorer and writer. He served as director of the zoological department at the National Museum in Prague and became well known in his field for his 1933 book Through the African Wilderness and his 1935 zoological expedition in the Australian outback. In Australia, he teamed with Walter Drowley Filmer due to his local expertise with spiders. In 1943, he was deported to the Warsaw Ghetto. In 1944, he was murdered there.
	HERE LIVED; GUSTAV FISCHL; BORN 1892; DEPORTED; 1942 TO THERESIENSTADT; 1942 TO RIGA; MURDERED	Krásova 447/33; 50.085049°N 14.446421°E	Gustav August Fischl was born on 29 April 1892 in Vlksice in the South Bohemian Region. His parents were Leopold Fischel (1840-1898) and Helene née Berger (1851-1937). He had twelve siblings, seven brothers and five sisters. He was married to Adéla née Mosauerová. The couple had two daughters, Inge (born 1929) and Hansi, also Hanička (born 1932). In the 1920s and early 1930s the family lived in the Rychnov u Jablonce nad Nisou - Liberec Region where there daughters were born. When they moved to Prague is not known. The last residence of the family before deportation was in Prague XII, Na Zájezdu 12. On 3 August 1942, Gustav August Fischl, his wife and their daughters were deported to Theresienstadt concentration camp by transport AAw. His transport number was 314 of 1,001. After seventeen days there, the family was deported to Riga Ghetto by transport Bb. His transport number was 522 of 1,001. There, father, mother and their daughters, age 10 and 13, were murdered by the Nazi regime. Seven of his siblings were killed in the course of the Shoah. His brother Friedrich was shot in the woods on 9 November 1939 in the course of the Reichskristallnacht. His brother Richard was murdered in 1942 in Treblinka extermination camp. His sisters Albína and Ottilie, as well as Albína's husband Hogo Bloch were murdered in July 1942 in Baranovichi. His sister Luisa was murdered in 1942 in an unknown location in Poland. His brother Emil and his wife Kamila were murdered in an unknown location after deportation to Ujazdów. His brother Arnold was murdered on 13 July 1944 in Łódź Ghetto. His mother-in-law Gisela Mosauerová was also murdered in 1942 in Treblinka.
	HERE LIVED; ADELE FISCHLOVÁ; BORN 1899; DEPORTED; 1942 TO THERESIENSTADT; 1942 TO RIGA; MURDERED	Krásova 447/33; 50.085049°N 14.446421°E	Adéla Fischlová née Mosauerová was born on 26 February 1899 in Karlovy Vary. Her parents were Rudolf Mosauer (1867-1934) and Gisela née Pächter (born on 5 September 1876). She had an older sister, Marta (born 1897). She was married to Gustav August Fischl. The couple had two daughters, Inge (born 1929) and Hansi, also Hanička (born 1932). The last residence of the family before deportation was in Prague XII, Na Zájezdu 12. On 3 August 1942, Adéla Fischlová, her husband and their daughters were deported to Theresienstadt concentration camp by transport AAw. Her transport number was 313 of 1,001. After seventeen days there, the family was deported to Riga Ghetto by transport Bb. Her transport number was 521 of 1,001. There, father, mother and their daughters, age 10 and 13, were murdered by the Nazi regime. Her mother was murdered in 1942 in Treblinka. Her sister Marta, first married to Dr.Otto Brunner, who died 1926, then married to Dr.Franz Ekstein, had two daughters: Eva Maria born 5 March 1920 and Lia born 15 February 1926. They all survived the holocaust. Marta died in London in 1944 aged 47. Her brother Rudolf was killed in 1942 after his deportation to Piaski. Her sister Mathilda and her husband Leopold Bunzl were both murdered in 1942 in Trawniki. Her half sister Katharina and her husband Rudolf Pollak were both murdered in 1944 in Auschwitz. The fate of her other siblings is unknown. Her second step mother Wilhelmina Pächter was killed on 25 September 1944 in Theresienstadt.
	HERE LIVED; HANSI FISCHLOVÁ; BORN 1932; DEPORTED; 1942 TO THERESIENSTADT; 1942 TO RIGA; MURDERED	Krásova 447/33; 50.085049°N 14.446421°E	Hansi Fischlová, also Hanička, was born on 13 June 1932 in Jablonec nad Nisou. Her parents were Gustav Fischl and Adéla née Mosauerová. She had an older sister, Inge (born 1929). The sisters grew up in Czechoslovakia and when their Grandfather died they moved with their parents to Carlsbad/Karlovy Vary. They moved to Prague together with their parents and their grandmother Gisela Mosauerová in 1938/9. On 3 August 1942, Hanička Fischlová, her parents and her sister were deported to Theresienstadt concentration camp by transport AAw. Her transport number was 311 of 1,001. After seventeen days there, the family was deported to Riga Ghetto by transport Bb. Her transport number was 519 of 1,001. Their, father, mother and their daughters, age 10 and 13, were murdered by the Nazi regime. Her grandmother was murdered in the same year in Treblinka.
	HERE LIVED; INGE FISCHLOVÁ; BORN 1929; DEPORTED; 1942 TO THERESIENSTADT; 1942 TO RIGA; MURDERED	Krásova 447/33; 50.085049°N 14.446421°E	Inge Fischlová was born on 28 May 1929 in Liberec. Her parents were Gustav Fischl and Adéla née Mosauerová. She had an younger sister, Hansi (born 1932). The sisters grew up in Czechoslovakia, and when their Grandfather died they moved with their parents to Carlsbad/Karlovy Vary. They moved to Prague together with their parents and their grandmother Gisela Mosauerová. On 3 August 1942, Inge Fischlová, her parents and her sister were deported to Theresienstadt concentration camp by transport AAw. Her transport number was 312 of 1,001. After seventeen days there, the family was deported to Riga Ghetto by transport Bb. Her transport number was 520 of 1,001. There, father, mother and their daughters, age 10 and 13, were murdered by the Nazi regime. Her Grandmother was murdered in the same year in Treblinka.
	HERE LIVED; GISELA MOSAUEROVÁ; BORN 1876; DEPORTED; 1942 TO THERESIENSTADT; 1942 TO TREBLINKA; MURDERED	Krásova 447/33; 50.085049°N 14.446421°E	Gisela Mosauerová née Pächter was born on 5 September 1876 in Karlovy Vary. Her parents were Adolf Pächter (1845-1915) and Martha née Herschel (ca. 1857-1890). She had three siblings and four half siblings of later marriages of her father. She married Rudolf Mosauer (1867-1934). The couple had two daughters, Marta (born on 18 April 1897 in Karlovy Vary) and Adéla (born 1899). It is not known when she moved to Prague to live with her daughter Adéla and her family. Her last residence before deportation was in Prague XII, Na Zájezdu 12. On 13 July 1942, she was deported from Prague to Theresienstadt concentration camp by transport AAq. Her transport number was 12 of 1,001. There she was interned for three months. During this period she saw the family of her daughter Adéla arrive and leave again, when her daughter, her son-in-law Gustav Fischl and their two daughters, age 10 and 13, were deported to Riga. On 19 October 1942, the elderly lady was deported to Treblinka extermination camp by transport Bw. Her transport number was 1404 of 2,002. She was murdered by the Nazi regime. Her sister Marta, first married to Dr.Otto Brunner (he died 1926), then to Dr.Franz Ekstein, had two daughters: Eva Maria born 5 March 1920 and Lia born 15 February 1926. They all survived the holocaust. Marta died in London in 1944 aged 47. Her brother Rudolf was killed in 1942 after his deportation to Piaski. Her sister Mathilda and her husband Leopold Bunzl were both murdered in 1942 in Trawniki. Her half sister Katharina and her husband Rudolf Pollak were both murdered in 1944 in Auschwitz. The fate of her other siblings is unknown. Her second step mother Wilhelmina Pächter was killed on 25 September 1944 in Theresienstadt.
	HERE LIVED; LUDVÍK ROUBÍČEK; BORN 1899; DEPORTED 1942; TO THERESIENSTADT; MURDERED 1945; IN AUSCHWITZ	Biskupcova 1766/13; 50.089608°N 14.469368°E	Ludvík Roubíček was born on 27 June 1899. His last residence before deportation was in Prague XI, Cimburkova 20. On 20 November 1942, he was deported from Prague to Theresienstadt concentration camp by transport Cc. His transport number was 109 of 1,002. There he was interned for nearly two years. On 29 September 1944, he was deported to Auschwitz concentration camp by transport El. His transport number was 158 of 1,500. He was murdered by the Nazi regime. At the same address, Dagmar and Irena Roubíčková were registered. Both survived the Shoah. It is not known in which relation the ladies stood with Ludvík Roubíček.
	HERE LIVED; DAGMAR ROUBÍČKOVÁ; BORN 1925; DEPORTED 1943; TO THERESIENSTADT; SURVIVED	Biskupcova 1766/13; 50.089608°N 14.469368°E	Dagmar Roubíčková was born in 1925. She was deported to Theresienstadt concentration camp in 1943. She survived.
	HERE LIVED; IRENA ROUBÍČKOVÁ; BORN 1928; DEPORTED 1943; TO THERESIENSTADT; SURVIVED	Biskupcova 1766/13; 50.089608°N 14.469368°E	Irena Roubíčková was born on 23 December 1928. On 6 March 1943, she was deported from Prague to Theresienstadt concentration camp by transport Cv. Her transport number was 150. There she was interned for more than 18 months. On 6 October 1944, she was deported to Auschwitz concentration camp by transport Eo. Her transport number was 756. She survived.
	HERE LIVED; ADOLF SOJKA; BORN 1890; DEPORTED 1942; TO THERESIENSTADT; MURDERED; IN AUSCHWITZ	Radhoštská 1940/6; 50.078108°N 14.456805°E	Adolf Sojka was born on 14 April 1891. He was married to Olga née Taussig. The last residence of the couple before deportation was in Prague XII. On 8 February 1942, he was deported from Prague to Theresienstadt concentration camp by transport W. His transport number was 374 of 1,002. Most probably his wife was on the same transport. There they were interned for more than two and a half years. Then the couple were separated on 28 September 1944 when Adolf Soyka was deported to Auschwitz concentration camp by transport Ek. His transport number was 448 of 2,500. He was murdered by the Nazi regime. His wife survived.
	HERE LIVED; OLGA SOJKOVÁ; BORN 1895; DEPORTED 1942; TO THERESIENSTADT; SURVIVED	Radhoštská 1940/6; 50.078108°N 14.456805°E	Olga Sojková née Taussig was born in 1895 in Prague. Her parents were Leopold Taussig and Wilhelmine née Freund. She was married to Adolf Soyka. In 1942, the couple were deported in 1942 to Theresienstadt concentration camp. After two and a half years they were separated when Adolf Soyka was deported to Auschwitz concentration camp on 28 September 1944. Her husband was murdered, Olga Soyková could survive.

== Dates of collocations ==
According to the website of Gunter Demnig the Stolpersteine of Prague were posed on 8 October 2008, 7 November 2009, 12 June 2010, 13 to 15 July 2011 and on 17 July 2013 by the artist himself. A further collocation occurred on 28 October 2012, but is not mentioned on Demnig's page.

The Czech Stolperstein project was initiated in 2008 by the Česká unie židovské mládeže (Czech Union of Jewish Youth) and was realized with the patronage of the Mayor of Prague.

== See also ==
- List of cities by country that have stolpersteine
- Stolpersteine in the Czech Republic
