= Robert Snodgrass (disambiguation) =

Robert Snodgrass (born 1987) is a Scottish footballer.

Robert Snodgrass may also refer to:

- Robert Evans Snodgrass (1875–1962), American entomologist
- Robert R. Snodgrass (1902–1969), American businessman and politician
- Bob Snodgrass, American lamp worker
