= Thomas Lyle =

Thomas Lyle may refer to:

- Tom Lyle (1953–2019), American comic book artist
- Thomas Ranken Lyle (1860–1944), Irish physicist, radiologist and rugby union international player
- Thomas Lyle (antiquarian) (1792–1852), author of Ancient Ballads and Songs
