= Joseph Patrick Slattery =

Joseph Patrick Slattery, CM (21 May 1866 – 31 March 1931) was an Irish-born physicist, radiologist, Catholic priest, pioneer in the field of radiography in Australia and credited with the first use of fluoroscopy in Australia.

Born in 1866 in Waterford, Ireland, he traveled to Australia as a deacon in 1888, where he was ordained a priest by Cardinal Moran. As a member of the Vincentian Congregation, he and several of his confreres took over the running of St Stanislaus' at Bathurst from the diocesan clergy. Appointed to the position of professor and taught science, including physics and chemistry. Slattery had a keen interest in the new technology of wireless radio and was the first to install a wireless set west of the Blue Mountains. He was an early pioneer of radio in Australia and found delight in building radio sets.

Slattery built an X-ray practice at Bathurst and local doctors benefited greatly from this convenience. He performed mission work for the Vincentian fathers and toured Australia and New Zealand to serve the faithful. Slattery was superior of the Vincentian novitiate at Eastwood. He was appointed vice-rector of St. John's College at the University of Sydney. At Springwood and Manly, he was spiritual director of the seminaries for 6 years. Slattery performed parish work for the last three years of his life.

In 1931, he died and was buried in Rookwood Cemetery at Sydney, New South Wales, Australia.

== Life and times ==
Joseph Patrick Slattery was born in 1866 at Waterford, Ireland, the son of John and Hanna (née Walsh) Slattery. He attended Waterpark College, a Christian Brothers' College (Waterford) and then St. Vincent's College, Castleknock (Dublin) from 1877 to 1886.

At St Vincent's, he fell under the tutelage of Father Richard Bodkin, CM. Father Bodkin had an excellent science laboratory that included a Callan battery from noted Irish priest, scientist and inventor Father Nicholas Callan. In 1886, Slattery achieved honours in experimental physics from his university examinations. On 7 September 1886, he entered St. Joseph's, the Vincentian seminary at Blackrock in Dublin, Ireland.

Slattery was offered a position as professor at St. Stanislaus' College in Bathurst, Australia. He left Dublin and arrived in Sydney on 29 November 1888. On 1 January 1889, he took over as headmaster and joined the Vincentian staff to assist with the operation of the College. He taught courses in the natural sciences, in particular chemistry and physics.

He continued ecclesiastical studies while he taught the natural sciences. Slattery began to amass scientific equipment for the school's laboratories. Much of the equipment and devices he built himself, as he was an expert glassblower. He was assisted by chemistry teacher and collaborator, C. A. Mulholland. On 8 December 1891, Slattery was ordained as a Catholic priest by Cardinal Patrick Francis Moran in the college chapel and became prefect of studies. Until 1911, he continued to teach physics, chemistry and geology.

In 1893, Slattery installed gas lighting fixtures with incandescent burners into the study halls, almost one year before these became available in Australia. In 1895, the college acquired a gasoline powered engine, a six-inch (15 cm) sparking coil and two Crookes tubes. That same year the school upgraded to an oil powered engine, dynamo and storage batteries that supplied electric light to the science halls. At the time this was the only electric light in Bathurst. Next, he built an acetylene gas powered generator to provide stage lighting for the college theatre. At this time he developed an early interest in colour photography.

== X-ray pioneer ==
In January 1896, Slattery read in local newspapers of Wilhelm Röntgen's breakthrough: “A new photographic discovery” and focused his pursuits on radiography.

He read of events in Melbourne, Adelaide and Sydney and on 25 July 1896 he took a radiograph of the hand of 12-year-old Eric Thompson, enabling the surgeon Dr. Edmunds to extract shotgun pellets from the hand. Before viewing the X-ray, the surgeon had considered amputation of the injured hand.

Slattery continued the radiology practice until 1911. Local doctors brought patients to his practice and word of his expertise developed. He built a thirteen-inch (33 cm) induction coil, sponsored by local individuals and this permitted shorter exposure times. He radiographed bone fractures along with splinters, metal shards and other objects embedded in the flesh. Slattery realised that the European-made focus tubes with prolonged use resulted in harder (or higher energy) X-rays as the vacua in the tubes increased. Slattery devised an improved regulator for the Crookes tubes and communicated these improvements to Röntgen, who replied with appreciation.

== Wireless telegraphy ==
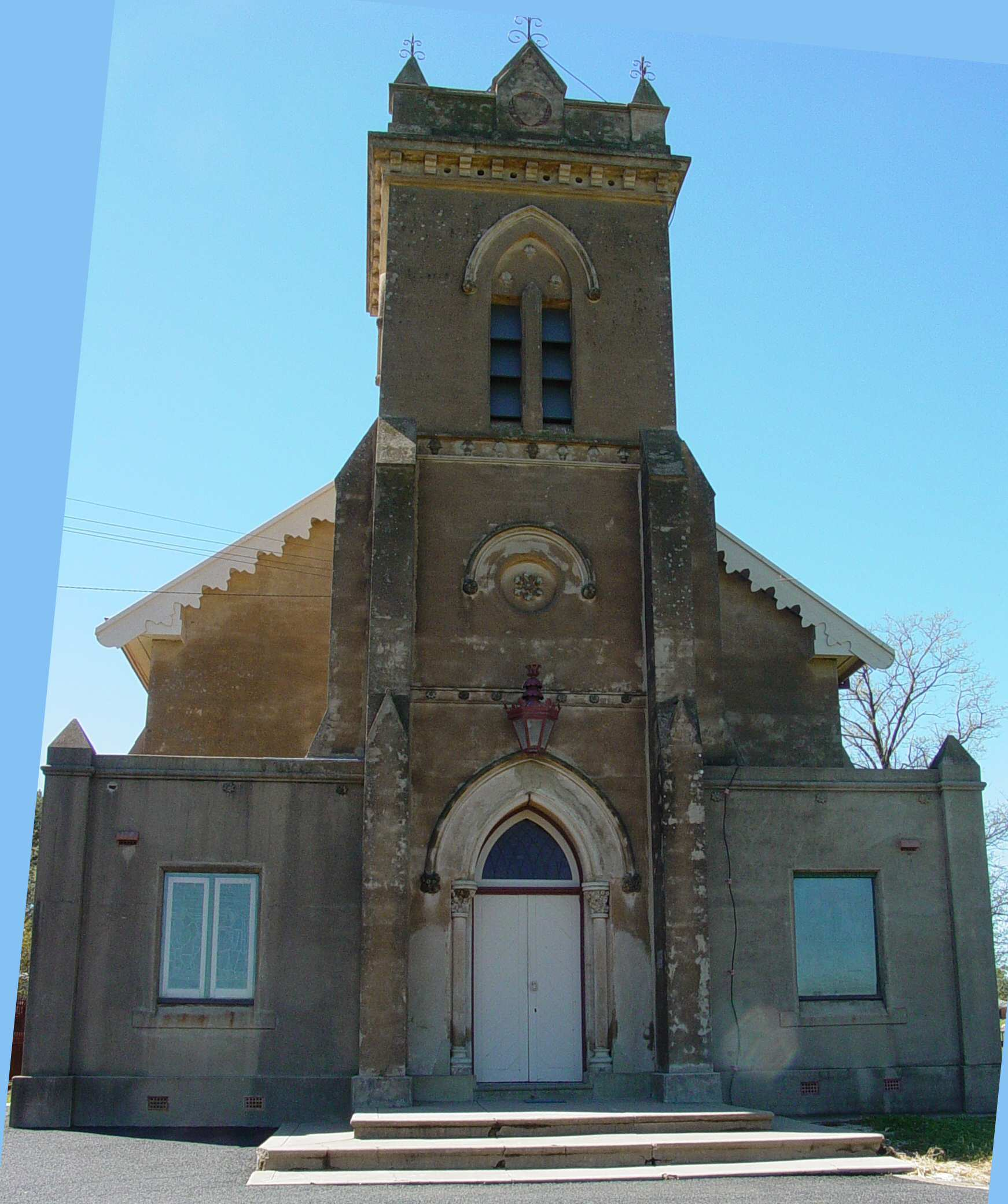
Kelso Holy Trinity Church DSC02618

Slattery had a keen interest in wireless telegraphy and in 1900 transmitted signals throughout the College campus. On 10 September 1900, he presented in Sydney to the Australasian Catholic Congress a paper, "The development of electrical sciences".

At Bathurst Technical College he delivered a talk on: “Electrical discharges through the air and rarefied gases”. In July 1903, St. Stanislaus College took delivery from London of wireless telegraphy equipment.

On 9 February 1904, messages were transmitted from the College and received at the Kelso Cathedral tower three miles (4.8 km) away. In 1910, he published in the College's year book (Echoes from St Stanislaus), a paper, "Wave motion in ether". At the outbreak of WWI in 1914, the wireless transmitter was dismantled. The wireless set that Slattery constructed has been preserved at St Stanislaus' College.

== Parish and Mission work ==
In 1911, Slattery was assigned to pastoral duties at St. Vincent's parish, in Ashfield, Sydney, Australia. Beginning in 1912, he preached in New South Wales and Queensland at missions and retreats. From 1920 to 1927, Slattery was spiritual director at the Springwood and Manly seminaries. He performed mission work for the Vincentian fathers and toured Australia and New Zealand to serve the faithful.

In 1923, Slattery was superior rector of St Joseph's Vincentian Novitiate at Eastwood. In September 1926, as his health was failing, he was appointed vice-rector of St. John's College at the University of Sydney. Slattery performed parish work for the last 3 years of his life. He died of heart disease on 31 March 1931, aged 64, in Lewisham Hospital and was buried in Rookwood Cemetery at Sydney.

== Accolades ==
Australia is one of the few countries to recognise a group of people for a major achievement where the group worked independently in different locales. To this day the accomplishments of these 3 people are disputed. Not the fact that the events occurred, but the claim of who did what first, and who should receive credit for being the first in Australia to perform medical radiography. Australia Post decided the most equitable way was to depict all three individuals on a postage stamp, issued to coincided and commemorate the 100th anniversary of Wilhelm Röntgen's discovery of X-rays. On 7 September 1995, Walter Drowley Filmer, Sir Thomas Ranken Lyle, and Father Slattery were recognised as pioneers of X-ray technology in Australia.
