= Marver =

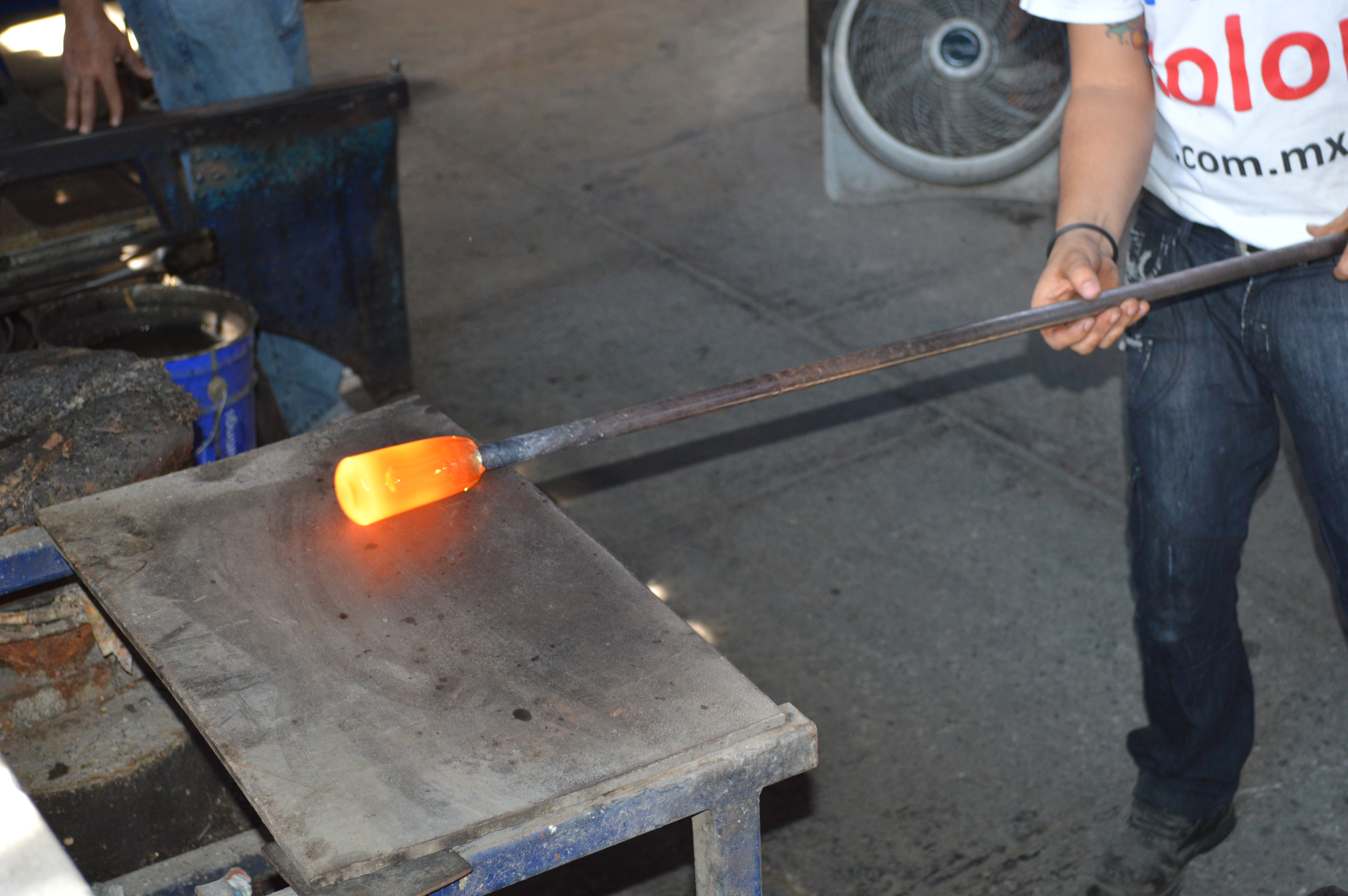
A modern-day marver being used to shape glass.

A marver is a tool used in glassblowing. It generally is made of a polished steel, brass, or graphite surface attached to a metal or wooden table. For fine applications such as lampworking, a smaller hand-held implement may instead be used. As a tool, marvers date back to glassblowing techniques of the Roman Empire and were made of marble.

Warm glass is rolled on the marver, both to shape it and as a means of temperature control. With a high specific heat capacity, the surface absorbs heat from the glass; because of the relatively slow flow of heat through the glass, it does so particularly from the outermost material, forming a more viscous skin.

Because the glass comes in direct contact with the marver, it must be kept exceptionally clean in order to prevent points of poor conduction or the transfer of debris into glass worked upon it. Metallic marvers are generally rubbed with steel wool and then wiped with rubbing alcohol to prevent rust.
