= Degenerate Art (film) =

2011 documentary film by Aaron Golbert

Degenerate Art: The Art and Culture of Glass Pipes
- Film poster
- Directed by: Marble Slinger
- Produced by: Marble Slinger
- Release date: March 9, 2012 (SXSW film festival)
- Running time: 74 min
- Language: English

Degenerate Art: The Art and Culture of Glass Pipes is a 2012 documentary by American pipe maker Aaron Golbert, a.k.a. Marble Slinger, on the art and culture associated with glass pipes used for smoking cannabis. Its title references the German expression degenerate art, an invective used to denigrate modern art during the Nazi regime. The film, which was featured at the SXSW Festival in Austin, Texas in 2012, follows the history of glass pipe-making culture and the tremendous influence of Bob Snodgrass. The documentary also explores Operation Pipe Dreams and its impact on actor Tommy Chong.

The film was received well. Critics praised the filmmaking and glass blowing art on display, but felt the runtime was too long.
