= Thomas Ranken Lyle =

Irish rugby union player

- Sir Thomas Lyle F.R.S.
- Born: Thomas Ranken Lyle; 26 August 1860 Coleraine, County Londonderry, Ireland
- Died: 31 March 1944 (aged 83) South Yarra, Australia
- University: Trinity College, Dublin
- Notable relative: Dame Mary Herring (daughter)
- Occupation: Mathematical physicist

Rugby union career
- Position: Forward
Amateur team(s)
Years	Team	Apps	(Points)
188x–188x	Dublin University		
International career
Years	Team	Apps	(Points)
1885–1887	Ireland	5	(0)

Sir Thomas Ranken Lyle FRS (26 August 1860 – 31 March 1944) was an Irish-Australian mathematical physicist, radiologist, educator, and rugby player.

Lyle was born and educated in Ireland before emigrating to Australia to take up a professorship at the University of Melbourne. There he was a pioneer in the use of X-rays as a medical tool. The Thomas Ranken Lyle Medal is awarded in his name to honour Australian achievements in Physics and Mathematics.

In his earlier years in Ireland he was a rugby union forward of some note, who played club rugby for Dublin University and international rugby for Ireland.

== Career ==
Lyle was born in Coleraine, Ireland in 1860, the second son of Hugh Lyle, a well-to-do landowner. He was educated at Trinity College, Dublin, graduating in 1883 with full honours and student medals for his work in mathematics and physics. He received his MA in 1887, and continued his studies in advanced physics and mathematics. By 1889 he had emigrated to Australia, and at the age of 29, took up the position of the chair of natural philosophy at the University of Melbourne. In 1891 a Master of Science was introduced at the university, and Lyle used the opportunity to set up a small research program.

In 1892 Lyle married Frances Isobel Clare Millear, the daughter of a prominent Western District grazier, and the two set up home in a professorial house provided by the university. They had four children, Mary, Nancy, Thomas, and Clare. Their first child, Mary Ranken Lyle (born in 1894), became a notable physician, and married Edmund Herring in 1922.

In February 1896, news reached the scientific community in Australia of Wilhelm Röntgen's discovery of a new type of electromagnetic radiation. Lyle was one of several scientists within Australia to attempt to recreate Röntgen's experiments. As the equipment did not exist in the university, Lyle was forced to create it himself. He was an expert glassblower, and was able to make and excavate his own Crookes tube to produce practical X-rays.

Lyle is credited with taking and publishing one of the first X-ray photos in Australia, independently of contemporary fellow pioneers Father Joseph Patrick Slattery and Walter Drowley Filmer, namely a picture of the foot of a Professor Masson, which was reproduced in newspapers the next day. In June 1896 he was invited to take a photo of a patient who had a needle embedded in their hand. The resulting 'shadow photograph', as the images were then known, allowed doctors to remove the needle with a single incision.

In 1901 Lyle and his family moved into a 20-room blue-stone mansion in Irvine Road, Toorak. Lyle and his wife's wealth was such that they were able to hire a staff of eight to look after the household and the family cow. He had joined the board of visitors of the Melbourne Observatory in 1899, and from 1903 until his death he served as chairman. He represented the university on the Victorian Rhodes scholarship selection committee from 1904 until his retirement.

Although Lyle made early advances in X-rays, his field of expertise was in electrical power technology, especially in the areas of magnetic fields and alternating currents. He published many papers, most of which were also published in London. His scientific achievements were acknowledged in 1905 with the award of Sc.D. from Trinity College, Dublin, and again in 1912 with Fellowship of the Royal Society.

== Retirement ==
In 1914, with Ranken family inheritances, his wife's money, and wise financial investments, he was able to announce his retirement from the university. By this time, sporting injuries from his time playing rugby in Ireland had left him requiring crutches.

Lyle was a member of varying government bodies and inquiries, and held a directorship of the Metropolitan Gas Company. During the First World War he was a science advisor for the Naval Board, a member of the Federal Munitions Committee, and president of the Industries Exemption Advisory Committee. He was also one of the first three commissioners of Victoria's State Electricity Commission and was later made the organisation's first chairman. In 1919 he became a foundation member of the Australian National Research Council (ANRC), (the forerunner of the Australian Academy of Science), and served as its president in 1929–1932. He was knighted in 1922. "His outstanding contribution to the nation's scientific life was recognized by the ANRC when in 1931 it created the Thomas Ranken Lyle medal for distinguished Australian research in mathematics and physics."

He was very active with a wide range of positions in a wide range of public and private organisation until 1940, when a cerebral haemorrhage left him semi-invalid. His health deteriorated, and he died at South Yarra on 31 March 1944, survived by his wife, son and three daughters.

== Legacy ==
Since 1931, the Thomas Ranken Lyle Medal of the Australian Academy of Science has been awarded at most every two years to an Australian mathematician or physicist in honour of their outstanding research achievements.

On 7 September 1995, Lyle was one of seven scientists to be honoured with his image appearing on an Australian postage stamp. Lyle appeared on a 45-cent stamp, along with fellow pioneers of X-ray research Father Joseph Patrick Slattery and Walter Drowley Filmer.

== Honours and awards ==
- Fellow of the Royal Society
- Knight Bachelor
- Sc.D., Trinity College, Dublin

== Rugby career ==
While a student at Dublin University, Lyle played rugby union for the university team. He was impressive enough at university level to bring himself to the notice of the Irish selectors, and was capped for his first international match in the 1885 Home Nations Championship. Lyle played in both Irish games of the 1885 tournament, away loses to England and Scotland. The Scotland game was originally played in Ireland, but weather conditions forced the match to be abandoned after 20 minutes. Lyle played in both the original game and the replay, which sometimes incorrectly causes Lyle to be credited with six international caps. Despite a poor record the previous season, Lyle was reselected for the 1886 tournament, playing in a single game, a one-try loss to England.

He was captain of the Ireland team for a season and was leader of the forwards the year Ireland won the Triple Crown.

His final group of internationals were for the 1887 Home Nations Championship. Lyle was selected for the encounters with England and Scotland, which included his only winning international game when Ireland defeated England by two goals to nil. Lyle had one final role during the 1887 campaign when he was selected to referee the encounter between England and Scotland. His rugby career ended not much later when he suffered a knee injury which affected his health for the rest of his life.
