= Glassblowing =

Technique for forming glass

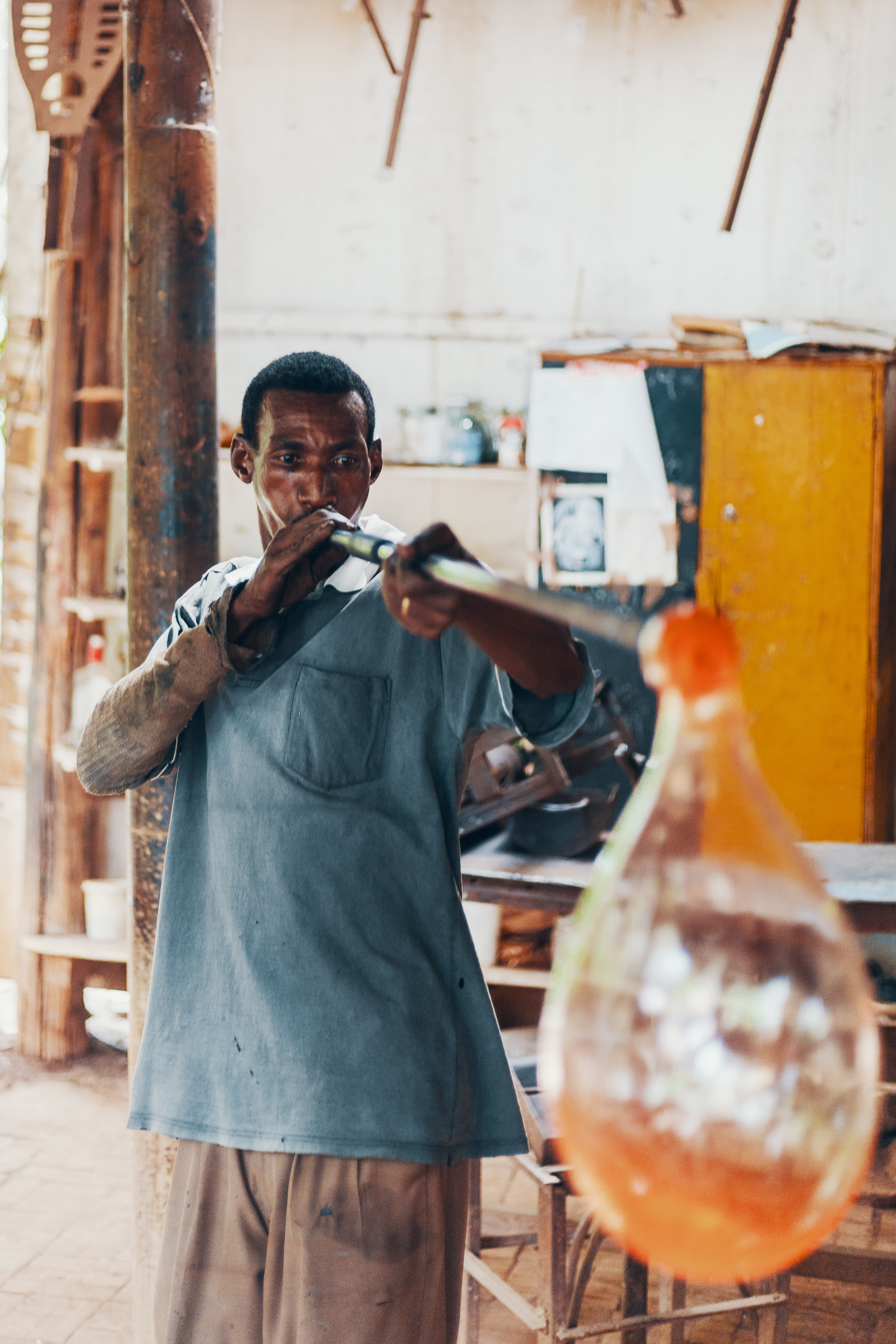
A glassworker blows air into the glass, creating a cavity inside.

Glassblowing is a glassforming technique that involves inflating molten glass into a bubble (or parison) with the aid of a blowpipe (or blow tube). A person who blows glass is called a glassblower, while the head of a glassblowing workshop is known as a gaffer. A lampworker (often also called a glassblower or glassworker) manipulates glass with the use of a torch on a smaller scale, such as in producing precision laboratory glassware out of borosilicate glass.

== Technology ==
=== Principles ===
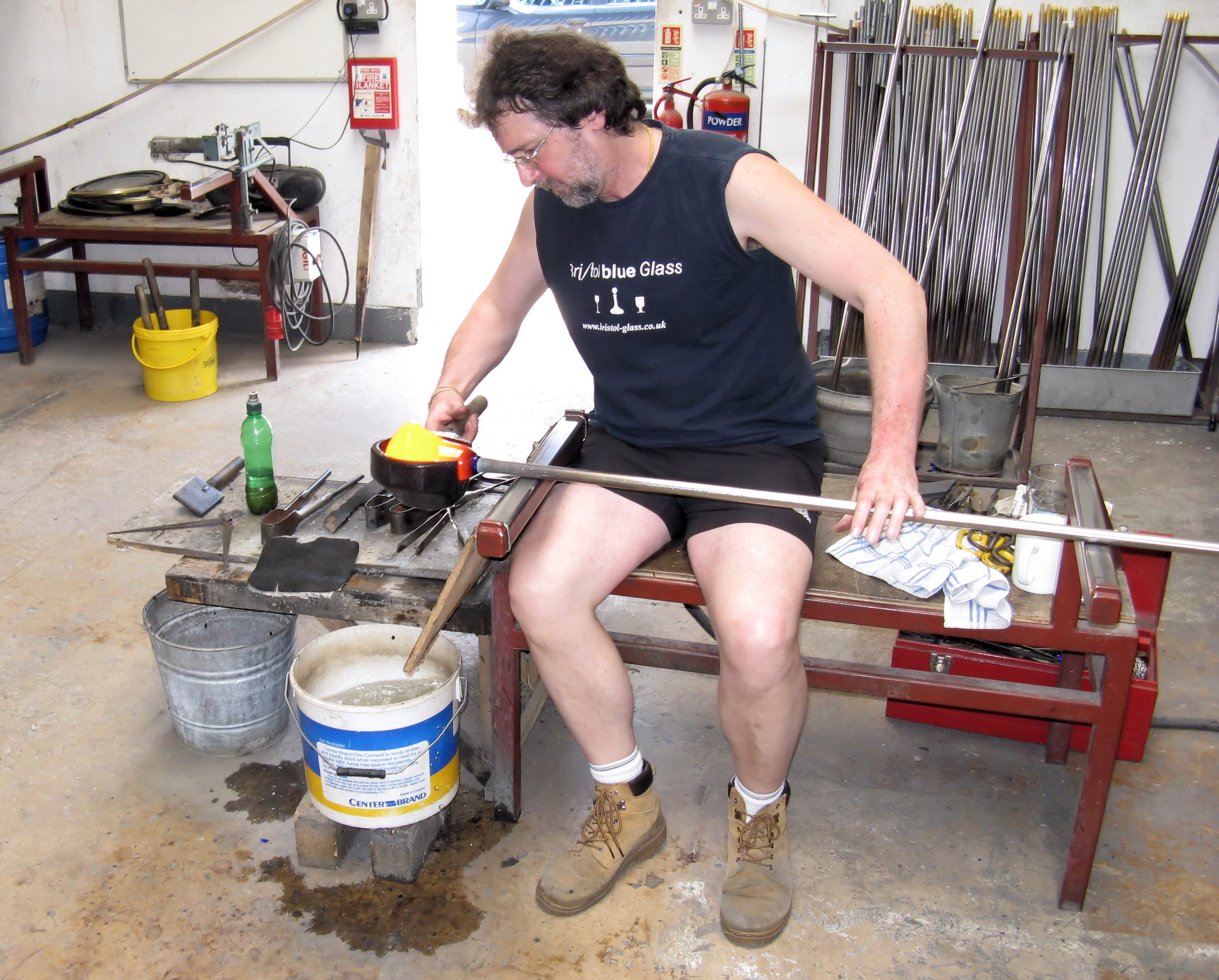
A stage in the manufacture of a Bristol blue glass ship's decanter. The blowpipe is being held in the glassblower's left hand. The glass is glowing yellow.

As a novel glass forming technique created in the middle of the 1st century BC, glassblowing exploited a working property of glass that was previously unknown to glassworkers: inflation, which is the expansion of a molten blob of glass by introducing a small amount of air into it. That is based on the liquid structure of glass where the atoms are held together by strong chemical bonds in a disordered and random network, therefore molten glass is viscous enough to be blown and gradually hardens as it loses heat.

To increase the stiffness of the molten glass, which in turn makes the process of blowing easier, there was a subtle change in the composition of glass. With reference to their studies of the ancient glass assemblages from Sepphoris of Israel, Fischer and McCray postulated that the concentration of natron, which acts as flux in glass, is slightly lower in blown vessels than those manufactured by casting. Lower concentration of natron would have allowed the glass to be stiffer for blowing.

During blowing, thinner layers of glass cool faster than thicker ones and become more viscous than the thicker layers. That allows production of blown glass with uniform thickness instead of causing blow-through of the thinned layers.

A full range of glassblowing techniques was developed within decades of its invention. The two major methods of glassblowing are free-blowing and mold-blowing.

==== Free-blowing ====
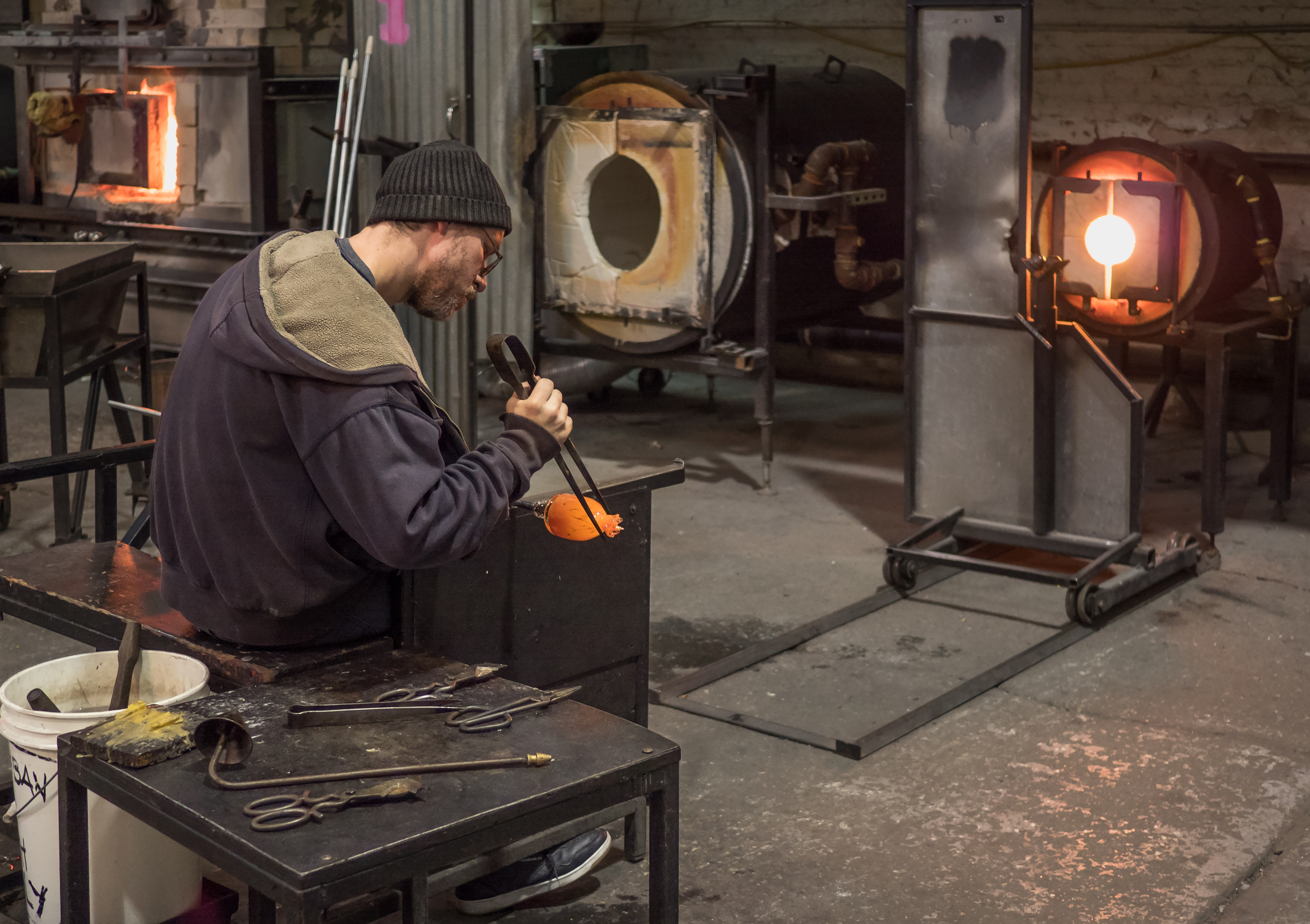
Glassworking in a hot shop in New York City

This method held a pre-eminent position in glass forming ever since its introduction in the middle of the 1st century BC until the late 19th century, and is still widely used as a glass forming technique, especially for artistic purposes. The process of free-blowing involves the blowing of short puffs of air into a molten portion of glass called a "gather" which has been spooled at one end of the blowpipe. This has the effect of forming an elastic skin on the interior of the glass blob that matches the exterior skin caused by the removal of heat from the furnace. The glassworker can then quickly inflate the molten glass to a coherent blob and work it into a desired shape.

Researchers at the Toledo Museum of Art attempted to reconstruct the ancient free-blowing technique by using clay blowpipes. The result proved that short clay blowpipes of about 30–60 cm (12–24 in) facilitate free-blowing because they are simple to handle and to manipulate and can be re-used several times. Skilled workers are capable of shaping almost any vessel forms by rotating the pipe, swinging it and controlling the temperature of the piece while they blow. They can produce a great variety of glass objects, ranging from drinking cups to window glass.

An outstanding example of the free-blowing technique is the Portland Vase, which is a cameo manufactured during the Roman period. An experiment was carried out by Gudenrath and Whitehouse with the aim of re-creating the Portland Vase. A full amount of blue glass required for the body of the vase was gathered on the end of the blowpipe and was subsequently dipped into a pot of hot white glass. Inflation occurred when the glassworker blew the molten glass into a sphere which was then stretched or elongated into a vase with a layer of white glass overlying the blue body.

==== Mold-blowing ====
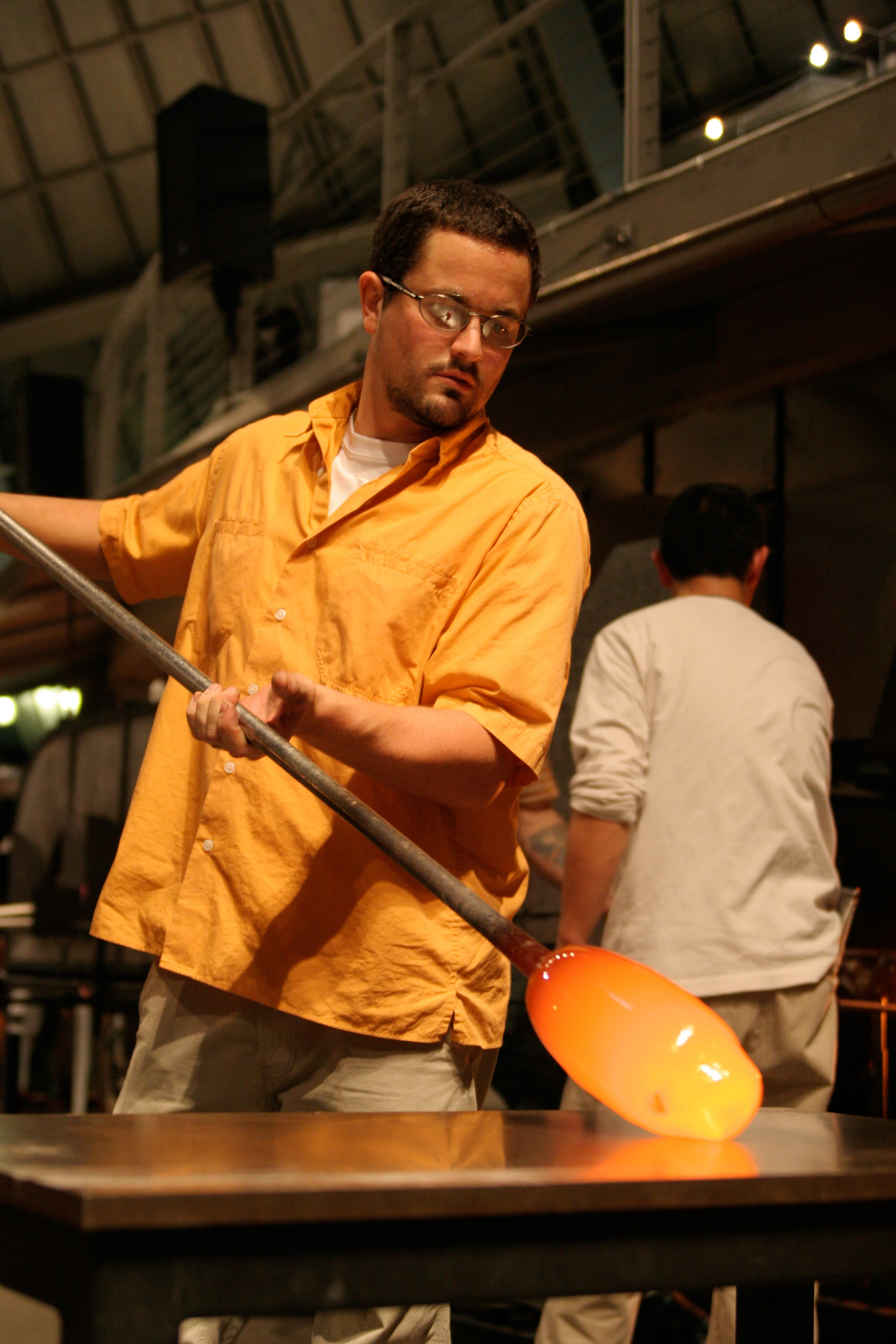
Glassblower Jean-Pierre Canlis sculpting a section of his piece "Insignificance"

Mold-blowing was an alternative glassblowing method that came after the invention of free-blowing, during the first part of the second quarter of the 1st century AD. A glob of molten glass is placed on the end of the blowpipe, and is then inflated into a wooden or metal carved mold. In that way, the shape and the texture of the bubble of glass is determined by the design on the interior of the mold rather than the skill of the glassworker.

Two types of mold, namely single-piece molds and multi-piece molds, are frequently used to produce mold-blown vessels. The former allows the finished glass object to be removed in one movement by pulling it upwards from the single-piece mold and is largely employed to produce tableware and utilitarian vessels for storage and transportation. Whereas the latter is made in multi-paneled mold segments that join, thus permitting the development of more sophisticated surface modeling, texture and design.

The Roman leaf beaker which is now on display in the J. Paul Getty Museum was blown in a three-part mold decorated with the foliage relief frieze of four vertical plants. Meanwhile, Taylor and Hill tried to reproduce mold-blown vessels by using three-part molds made of different materials. The result suggested that metal molds, in particular bronze, are more effective in producing high-relief design on glass than plaster or wooden molds.

The development of the mold-blowing technique has enabled the speedy production of glass objects in large quantity, thus encouraging the mass production and widespread distribution of glass objects.

=== Modern glassblowing ===
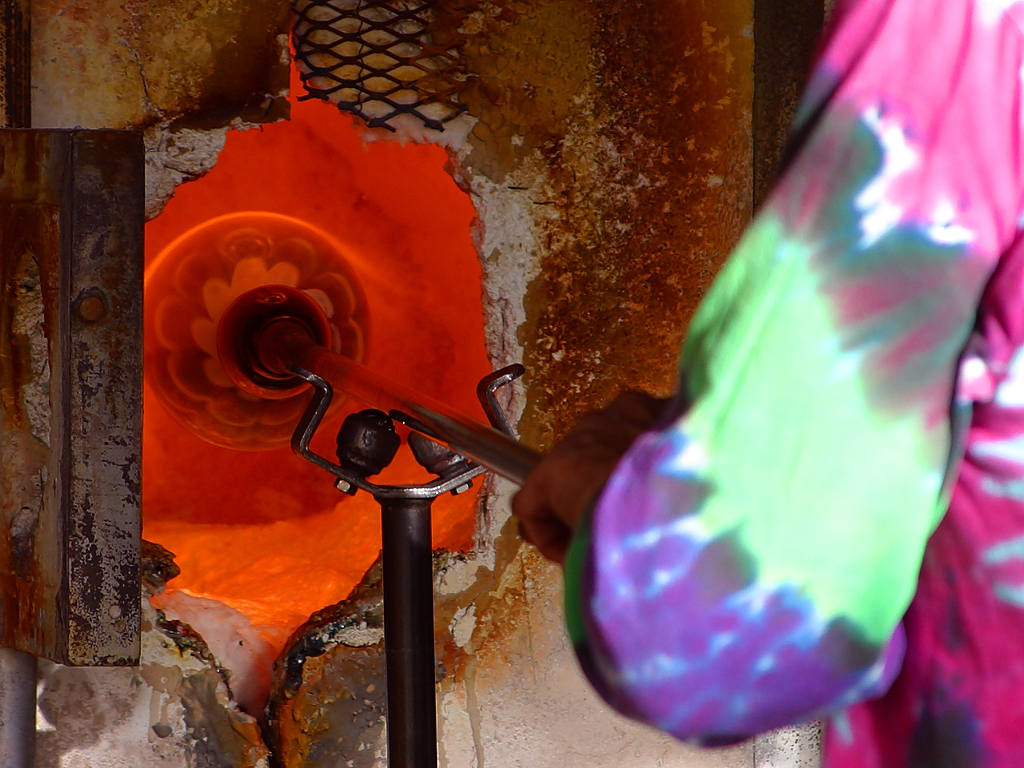
Use of a furnace to reheat a piece on the end of a blowpipe

How a wine glass is made, Kosta Boda, video

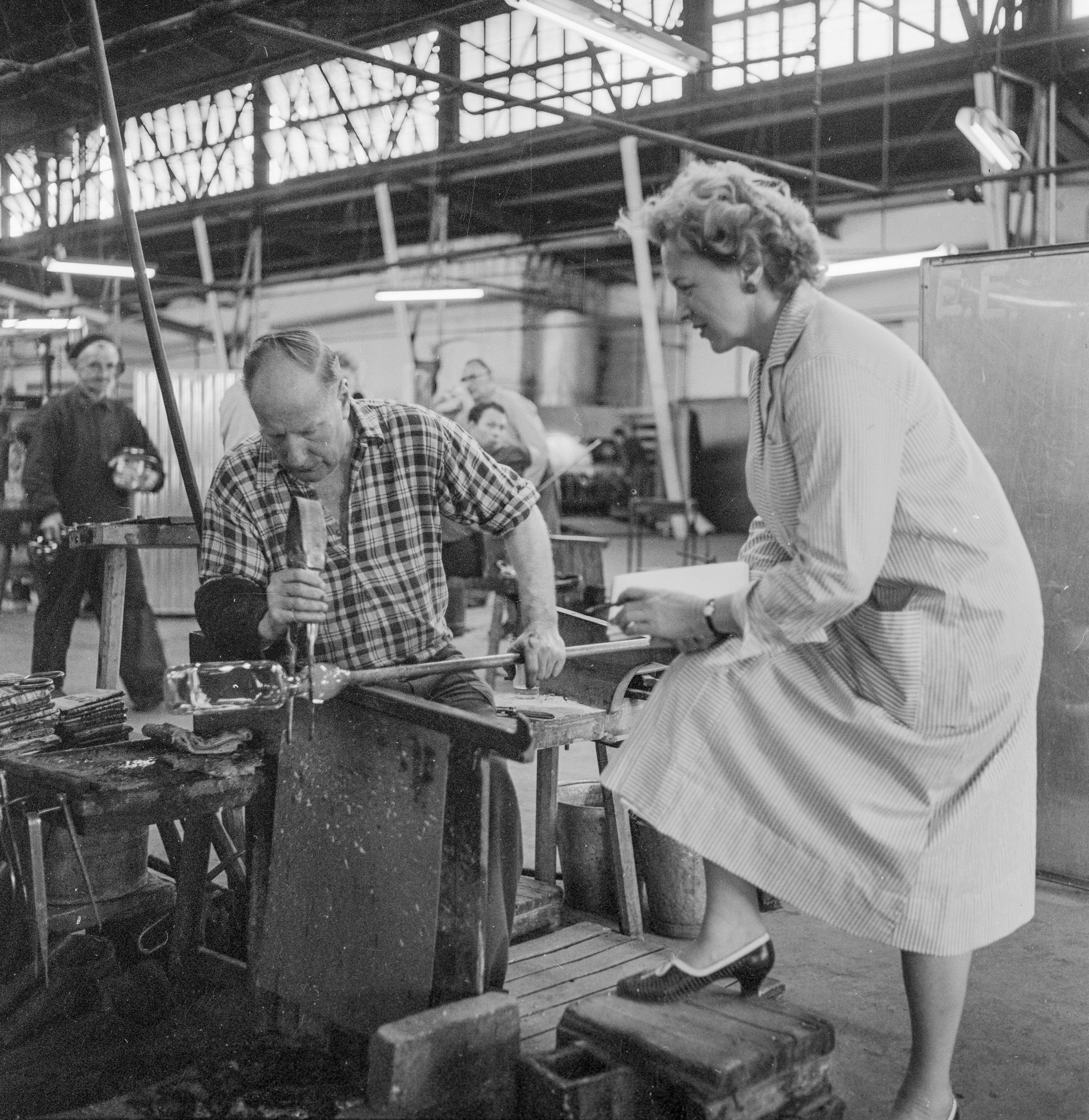
Mona Morales-Schildt at Kosta glassworks (Göran Schildt photo)

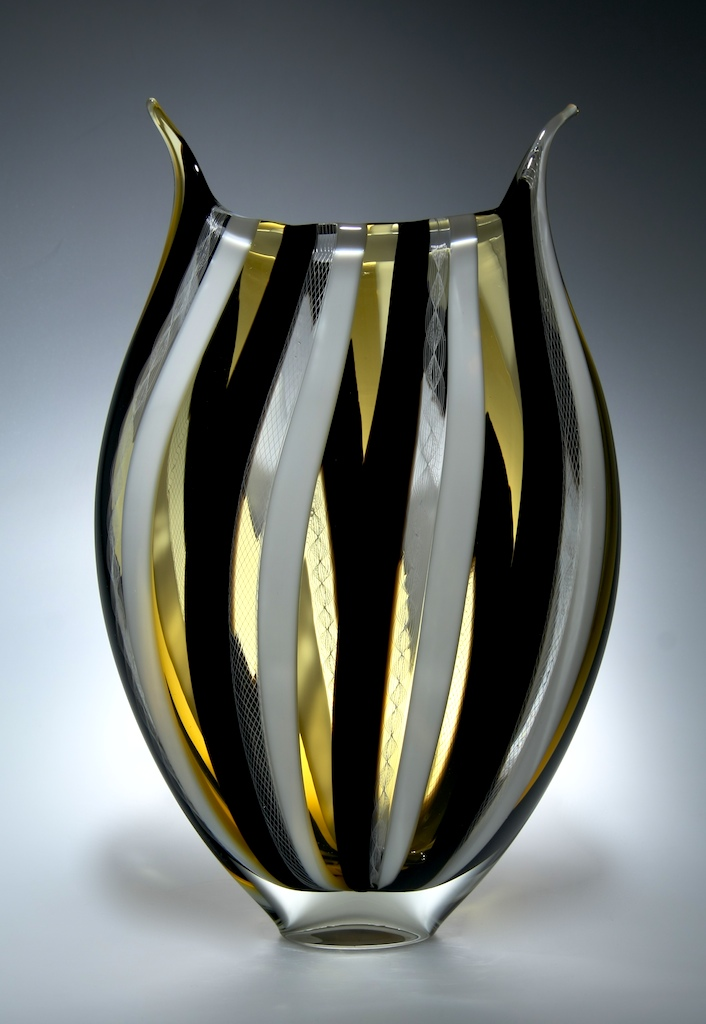
Glass can be made with precise striped patterns through a process called cane, which involves the use of rods of colored glass.

The transformation of raw materials into glass takes place at around 1,320 °C (2,400 °F); the glass emits enough heat to appear almost white hot. The glass is then left to "fine out" (allowing the bubbles to rise out of the mass), and then the working temperature is reduced in the furnace to around 1,090 °C (2,000 °F). At this stage, the glass appears to be a bright orange color. Though most glassblowing is done between 870 and 1,040 °C (1,600 and 1,900 °F), "soda-lime" glass remains somewhat plastic and workable at as low as 730 °C (1,350 °F). Annealing is usually done between 371 and 482 °C (700 and 900 °F).

Glassblowing involves three furnaces. The first, which contains a crucible of molten glass, is simply referred to as "the furnace". The second is called the "glory hole", and is used to reheat a piece in between steps of working with it. The final furnace is called the "lehr" or "annealer", and is used to slowly cool the glass, over a period of a few hours to a few days, depending on the size of the pieces. This keeps the glass from cracking or shattering due to thermal stress. Historically, all three furnaces were contained in one structure, with a set of progressively cooler chambers for each of the three purposes.

=== Tools ===
The major tools used by a glassblower are the blowpipe (or blow tube), punty (or punty rod, pontil, or mandrel), bench, marver, blocks, jacks, paddles, tweezers, newspaper pads, and a variety of shears.

==== Blowpipe ====
The tip of the blowpipe is first preheated; then dipped in the molten glass in the furnace. The molten glass is "gathered" onto the end of the blowpipe in much the same way that viscous honey is picked up on a honey dipper. This glass is then rolled on the marver, which was traditionally a flat slab of marble, but today is more commonly a fairly thick flat sheet of steel. This process, called "marvering", forms a cool skin on the exterior of the molten glass blob, and shapes it. Then air is blown into the pipe, creating a bubble. Next, the glassworker can gather more glass over that bubble to create a larger piece. Once a piece has been blown to its approximate final size, the bottom is finalized. Then, the molten glass is attached to a stainless steel or iron rod called a "punty" for shaping and transferring the hollow piece from the blowpipe to provide an opening and to finalize the top.

==== Bench ====
The bench is a glassblower's workstation; it includes places for the glassblower to sit, for the handheld tools, and two rails that the pipe or punty rides on while the blower works with the piece.

==== Blocks ====
Blocks are ladle-like tools made from water-soaked fruitwood, and are used similarly to the marver to shape and cool a piece in the early steps of creation. In similar fashion, pads of water-soaked newspaper (roughly 15 cm (6 in) square, 1.3 to 2.5 centimetres (0.5 to 1 in) thick), held in the bare hand, can be used to shape the piece.

==== Jacks ====
Jacks are tools shaped somewhat like large tweezers with two blades, which are used for forming shape later in the creation of a piece. Paddles are flat pieces of wood or graphite used for creating flat spots such as a bottom. Tweezers are used to pick out details or to pull on the glass. There are two important types of shears, straight shears and diamond shears. Straight shears are essentially bulky scissors, used for making linear cuts. Diamond shears have blades that form a diamond shape when partially open. These are used for cutting off masses of glass.

=== Patterning ===
There are many ways to apply patterns and color to blown glass, including rolling molten glass in powdered color or larger pieces of colored glass called "frit". Complex patterns with great detail can be created through the use of cane (rods of colored glass) and murrine (rods cut in cross-sections to reveal patterns). These pieces of color can be arranged in a pattern on a flat surface, and then "picked up" by rolling a bubble of molten glass over them. One of the most exacting and complicated caneworking techniques is "reticello", which involves creating two bubbles from cane, each twisted in a different direction and then combining them and blowing out the final form.

Lampworkers, usually but not necessarily work on a much smaller scale, historically using alcohol lamps and breath- or bellows-driven air to create a hot flame at a workbench to manipulate preformed glass rods and tubes. These stock materials took form as laboratory glassware, beads, and durable scientific "specimens"—miniature glass sculpture. The craft, which was raised to an art form in the late 1960s by Hans Godo Frabel (later followed by lampwork artists such as Milon Townsend and Robert Mickelson), is still practiced today. The modern lampworker uses a flame of oxygen and propane or natural gas. The modern torch permits working both the soft glass from the furnace worker and the borosilicate glass (low-expansion) of the scientific glassblower. This latter worker may also have multiple headed torches and special lathes to help form the glass or fused quartz used for special projects.

== History ==
=== Earliest evidence ===
In the first century BC, Phoenician and Syrian craftsmen developed the technique of blowing air into molten glass with a blowpipe, making it into a bubble and thence moulding it into a great variety of forms. Such inventions swiftly eclipsed all other traditional methods, such as casting and core-forming, in working glass.

=== Roman Empire ===
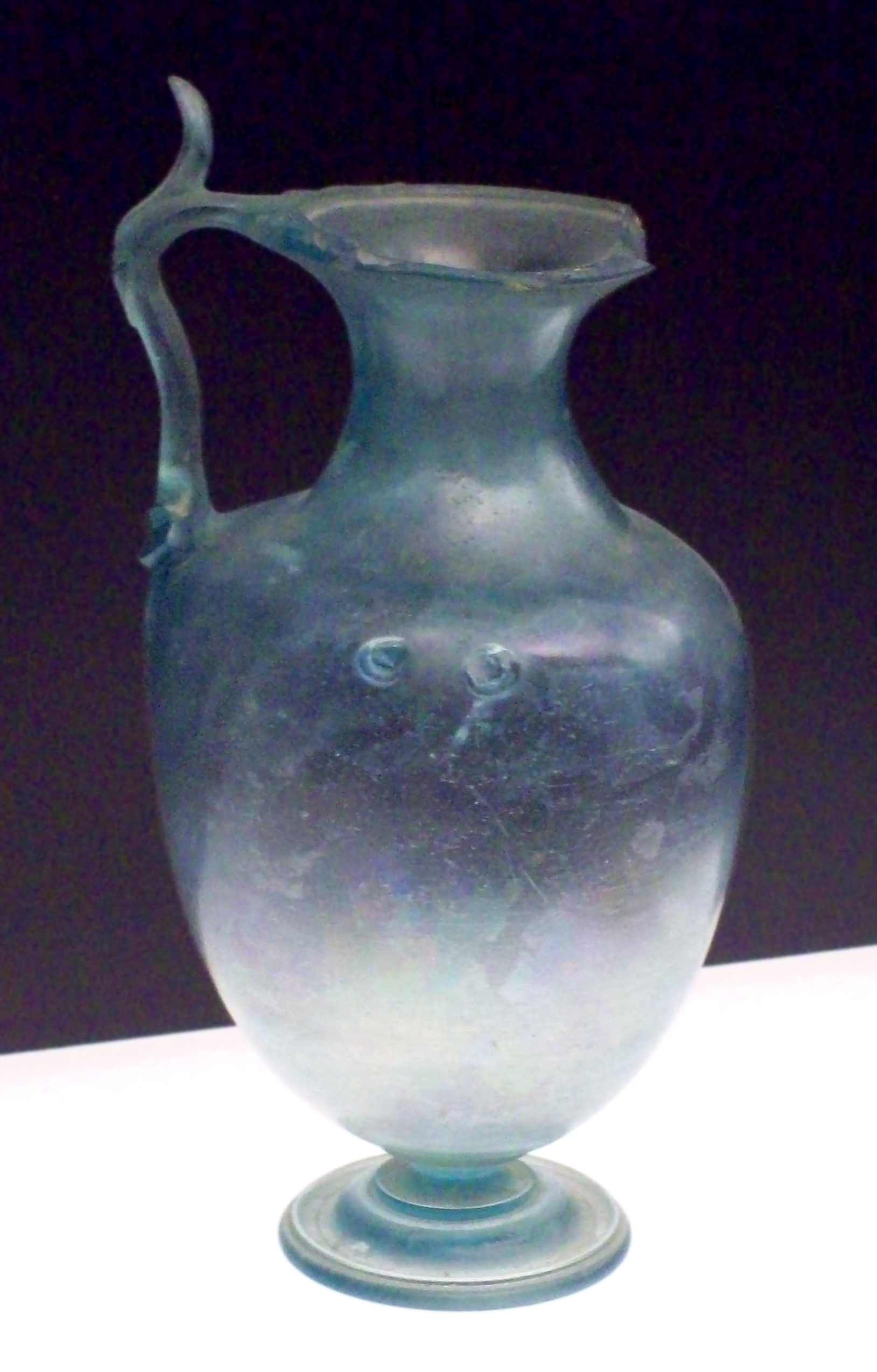
Roman blown glass hydria from Baelo Claudia (4th century AD)

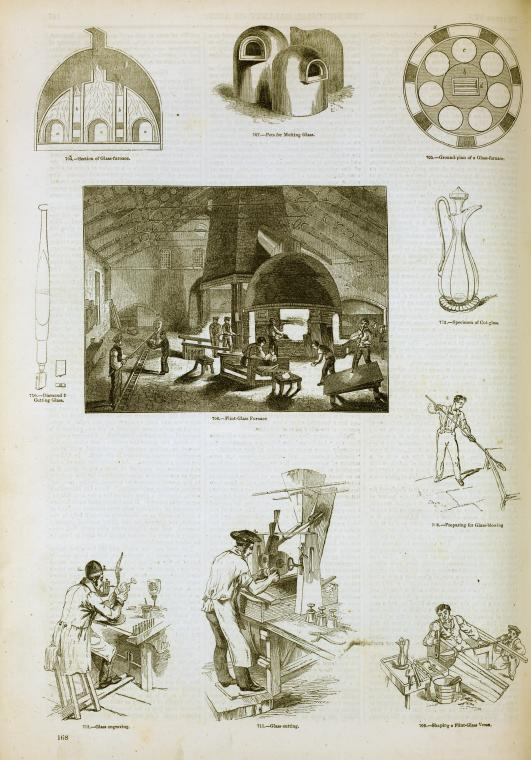
A glassworks in England in 1858. During the Industrial Revolution, techniques for mass-produced glassware were improved.

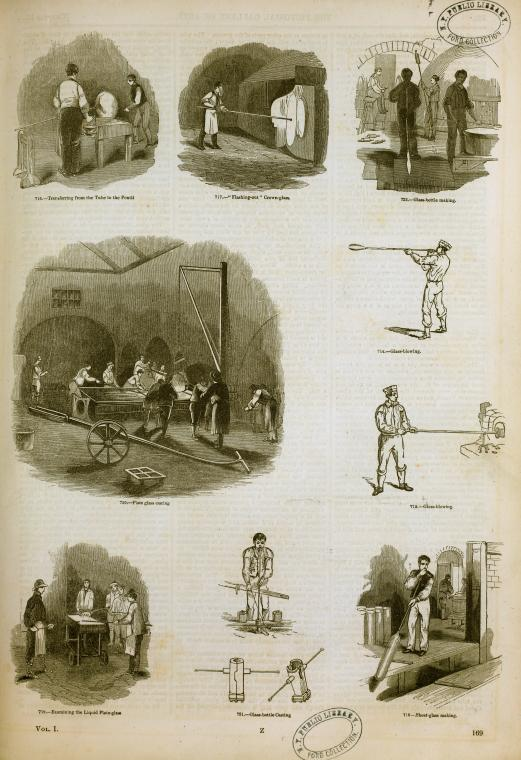
Glassblowing production methods in England in 1858

The invention of glassblowing coincided with the establishment of the Roman Empire in the 1st century BC, which enhanced the spread and dominance of this new technology. Blown glass has been found in many areas of the Roman world. On the eastern borders of the Empire, the first large glass workshops were set up by the Phoenicians in the birthplace of glassblowing in contemporary Lebanon and Israel as well as in the neighbouring province of Cyprus.

Ennion for example, was among the most prominent glassworkers from Lebanon of the time. He was renowned for producing the multi-paneled mold-blown glass vessels that were complex in their shapes, arrangement and decorative motifs. The complexity of designs of these mold-blown glass vessels illustrated the sophistication of the glassworkers in the eastern regions of the Roman Empire. Mold-blown glass vessels manufactured by the workshops of Ennion and other contemporary glassworkers such as Jason, Nikon, Aristeas, and Meges, constitutes some of the earliest evidence of glassblowing found in the eastern territories.

Eventually, the glassblowing technique reached Egypt and was described in a fragmentary poem printed on papyrus which was dated to the 3rd century AD. The Roman hegemony over the Mediterranean areas resulted in the substitution of glassblowing for earlier Hellenistic casting, core-forming and mosaic fusion techniques. The earliest evidence of blowing in Hellenistic work consists of small blown bottles for perfume and oil retrieved from the glass workshops on the Greek island of Samothrace and at Corinth in mainland Greece which were dated to the 1st century AD.

Later, the Phoenician glassworkers exploited their glassblowing techniques and set up their workshops in the western territories of the Roman Empire, first in Italy by the middle of the 1st century AD. Rome, the heartland of the empire, soon became a major glassblowing center, and more glassblowing workshops were subsequently established in other provinces of Italy, for example Campania, Morgantina and Aquileia. A great variety of blown glass objects, ranging from unguentaria (toiletry containers for perfume) to cameo, from tableware to window glass, were produced.

From there, escaping craftsmen (who had been forbidden to travel) otherwise advanced to the rest of Europe by building their glassblowing workshops in the north of the Alps (which is now Switzerland), and then at sites in northern Europe in present-day France and Belgium.

One of the most prolific glassblowing centers of the Roman period was established in Cologne on the river Rhine in Germany by the late 1st century BC. Stone base molds and terracotta base molds were discovered from these Rhineland workshops, suggesting the adoption and the application of mold-blowing technique by the glassworkers. Besides, blown flagons and blown jars decorated with ribbing, as well as blown perfume bottles with letters CCAA or CCA which stand for Colonia Claudia Agrippiniensis, were produced from the Rhineland workshops. Remains of blown blue-green glass vessels, for example bottles with handles, collared bowls and indented beakers, were found in abundance from the local glass workshops at Poetovio and Celeia in Slovenia.

Surviving physical evidence, such as blowpipes and molds which are indicative of the presence of blowing, is fragmentary and limited. Pieces of clay blowpipes were retrieved from the late 1st century AD glass workshop at Avenches in Switzerland. Clay blowpipes, also known as mouthblowers, were made by the ancient glassworkers due to the accessibility and availability of the resources before the introduction of the metal blowpipes. Hollow iron rods, together with blown vessel fragments and glass waste dating to approximately 4th century AD, were recovered from the glass workshop in Mérida of Spain, as well as in Salona in Croatia.

=== Middle Ages ===
The glass blowing tradition was carried on in Europe from the medieval period through the Middle Ages to the Renaissance in the demise of the Roman Empire in the 5th century AD. During the early medieval period, the Franks manipulated the technique of glassblowing by creating the simple corrugated molds and developing the claws decoration techniques. Blown glass objects, such as the drinking vessels that imitated the shape of the animal horn were produced in the Rhine and Meuse valleys, as well as in Belgium. The Byzantine glassworkers made mold-blown glass decorated with Christian and Jewish symbols in Jerusalem between the late 6th century and the middle of the 7th century AD. Mold-blown vessels with facets, relief and linear-cut decoration were discovered at Samarra in the Islamic lands.

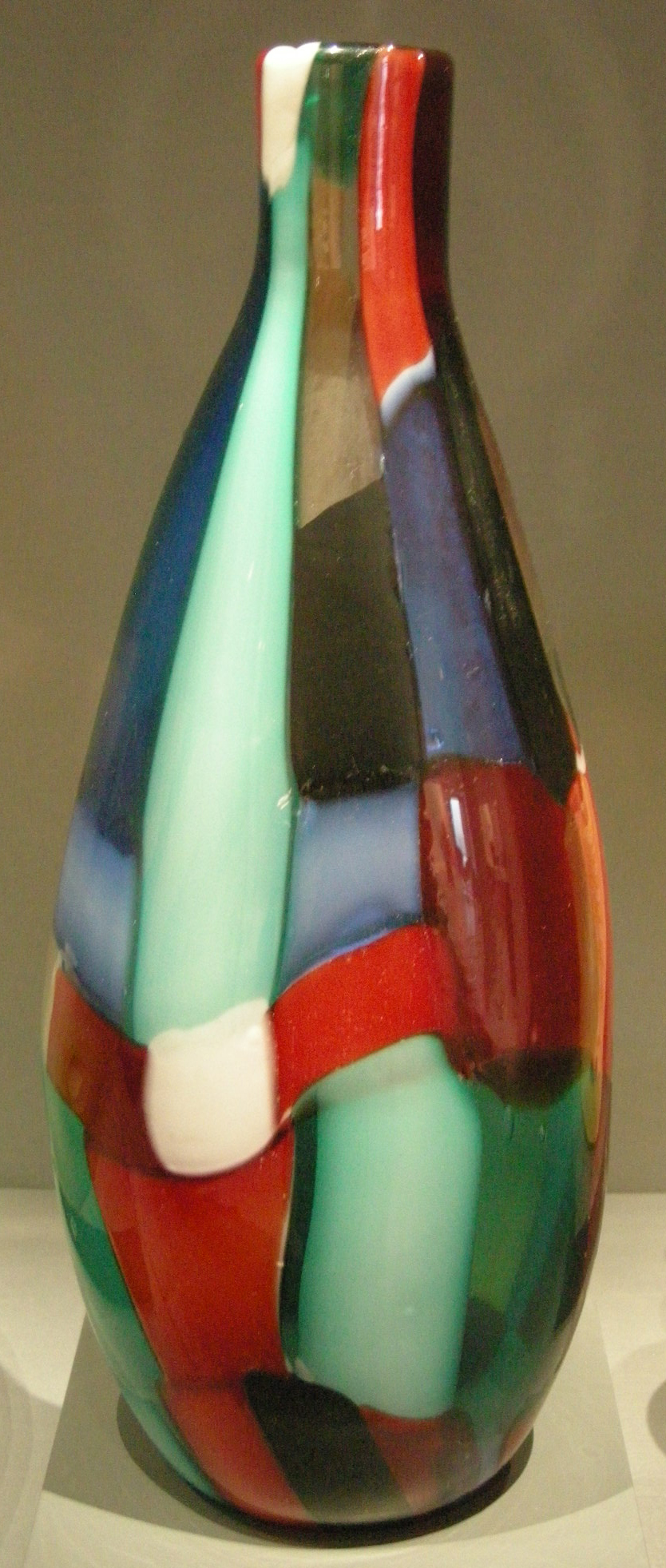
Venini & co., Murano vase by Fulvio Bianconi (c. 1950)

Renaissance Europe witnessed the revitalization of glass industry in Italy. Glassblowing, in particular the mold-blowing technique, was employed by the Venetian glassworkers from Murano to produce the fine glassware which is also known as "cristallo". The technique of glassblowing, coupled with the cylinder and crown methods, was used to manufacture sheet or flat glass for window panes in the late 17th century. The applicability of glassblowing was so widespread that glass was being blown in many parts of the world, for example, in China, Japan and the Islamic Lands.

The Nøstetangen Museum at Hokksund, Norway, shows how glass was made according to ancient tradition. The Nøstetangen glassworks had operated there from 1741 to 1777, producing table-glass and chandeliers in the German and English styles.

=== Recent developments ===
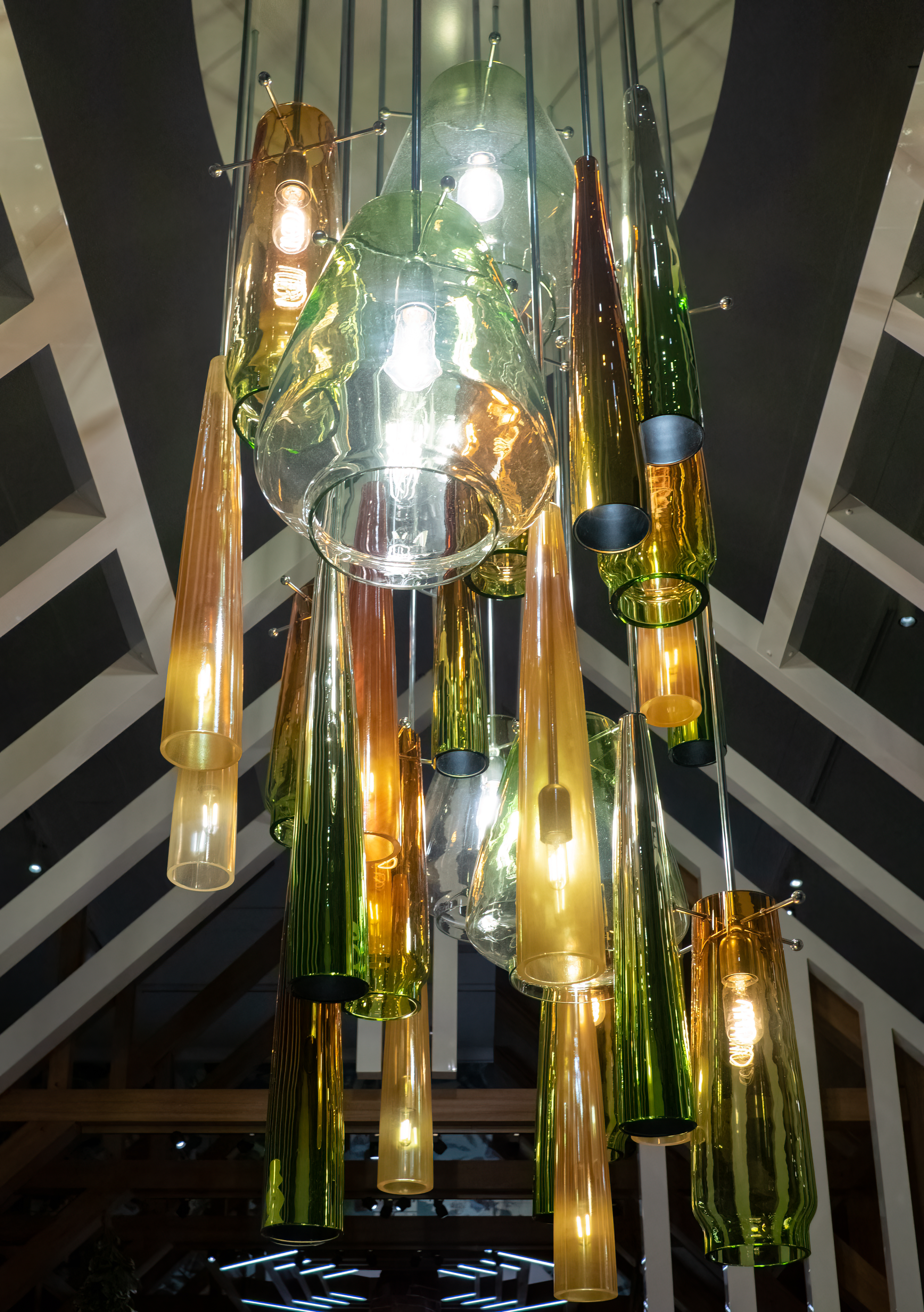
Vernus 3 by Ini Archibong, on display in the Metropolitan Museum of Art exhibition, Before Yesterday We Could Fly

The "studio glass movement" began in 1962 when Harvey Littleton, a ceramics professor, and Dominick Labino, a chemist and engineer, held two workshops at the Toledo Museum of Art, during which they started experimenting with melting glass in a small furnace and creating blown glass art. Littleton promoted the use of small furnaces in individual artists' studios. This approach to glassblowing blossomed into a worldwide movement, producing such flamboyant and prolific artists as Dale Chihuly, Dante Marioni, Fritz Driesbach and Marvin Lipofsky as well as scores of other modern glass artists. Today there are many different institutions around the world that offer glassmaking resources for training and sharing equipment.

Working with large or complex pieces requires a team of several glassworkers, in a complex choreography of precisely timed movements. This practical requirement has encouraged collaboration among glass artists, in both semi-permanent and temporary working groups.

In addition, recent developments in technology allow for the use of glass components in high-tech applications. Using machininery to shape and form glass enables to manufacture glass products of the highest quality and accuracy. As a result, glass is often used in semiconductor, analytical, life science, industrial, and medical applications.

=== In literature ===
The writer Daphne du Maurier was descended from a family of glass-blowers in 18th century France, and she wrote about her forebears in the 1963 historical novel The Glass-Blowers.

The subject of mystery novelist Donna Leon's Through a Glass, Darkly is the investigation of a crime in a Venetian glassworks on the island of Murano.

== See also ==
- Angel gilding
- Corning Museum of Glass
- Crown glass (window)
- Flat glass
- Glass art
- Glass beadmaking
- Glass sculpture
- Glass tiles
- Glassfusing
- List of glass artists
- Mosaic
- Paolo Venini
- Paperweight
- Stained glass
- Blown Away (TV series)
