= Lampworking =

Type of glasswork

Lampwork Glass Eye Cabochon Tutorial Boro

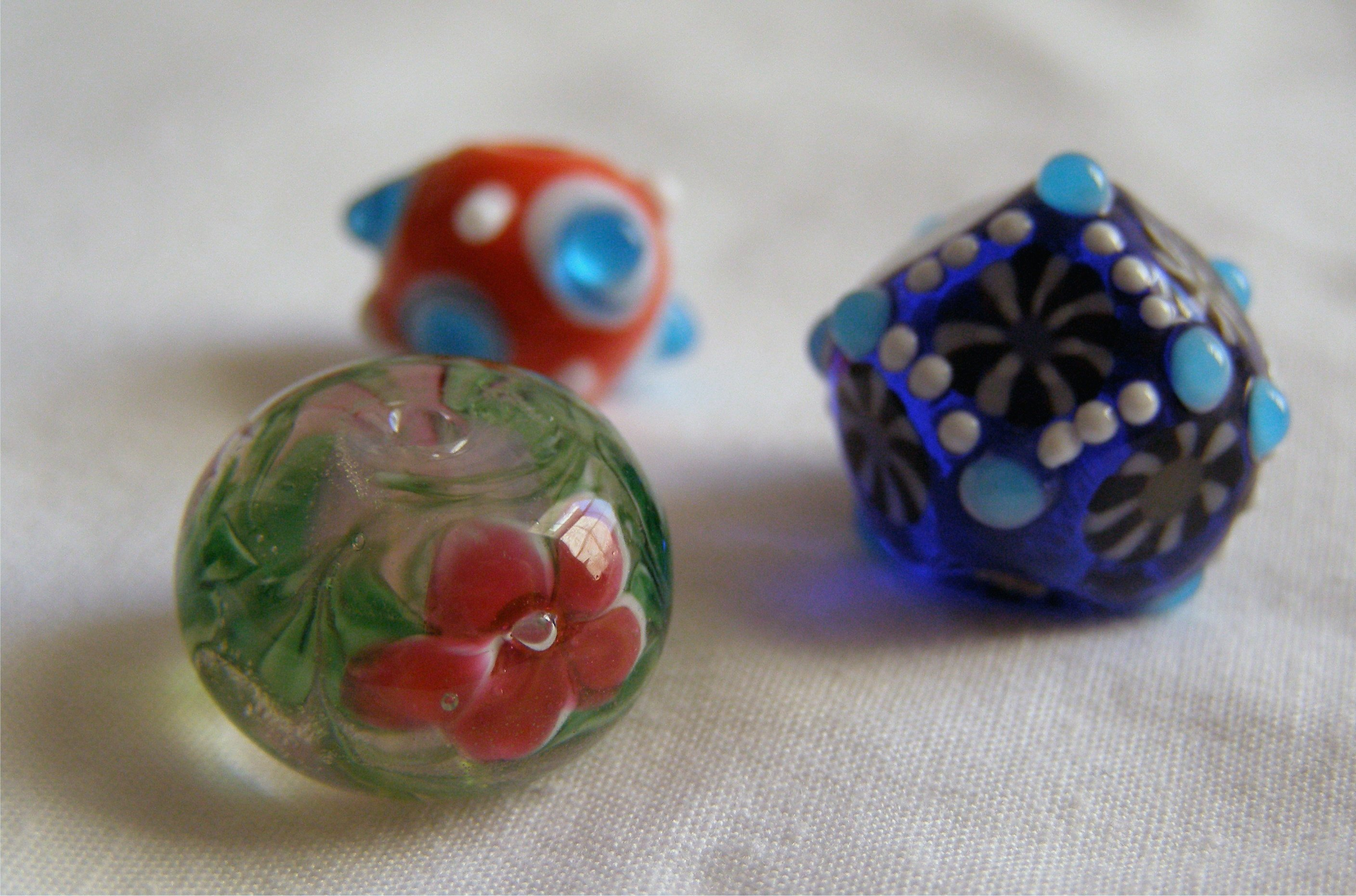
Lampwork glass beads

Lampworking is a type of glasswork in which a torch or lamp is used to melt the glass. Once in a molten state, the glass is formed by blowing and shaping with tools and hand movements. It is also known as flameworking or torchworking, as the modern practice no longer uses oil-fueled lamps. Although lack of a precise definition for lampworking makes it difficult to determine when this technique was first developed, the earliest verifiable lampworked glass is probably a collection of beads thought to date to the fifth century BCE. Lampworking became widely practiced in Murano, Italy in the 14th century. As early as the 17th century, itinerant glassworkers demonstrated lampworking to the public. In the mid-19th century lampwork technique was extended to the production of paperweights, primarily in France, where it became a popular art form, still collected today. Lampworking differs from glassblowing in that glassblowing uses a furnace as the primary heat source, although torches are also used.

Early lampworking was done in the flame of an oil lamp, with the artist blowing air into the flame through a pipe or using foot-powered bellows. Most artists today use torches that burn either propane or natural gas, or in some countries butane, for the fuel gas, mixed with either air or pure oxygen as the oxidizer. Many hobbyists use MAPP gas in portable canisters for fuel and some use oxygen concentrators as a source of continuous oxygen.

Lampworking is used to create artwork, including beads, figurines, marbles, small vessels, sculptures, Christmas tree ornaments, and much more. It is also used to create scientific instruments as well as glass models of animal and botanical subjects.

== Glass selection ==
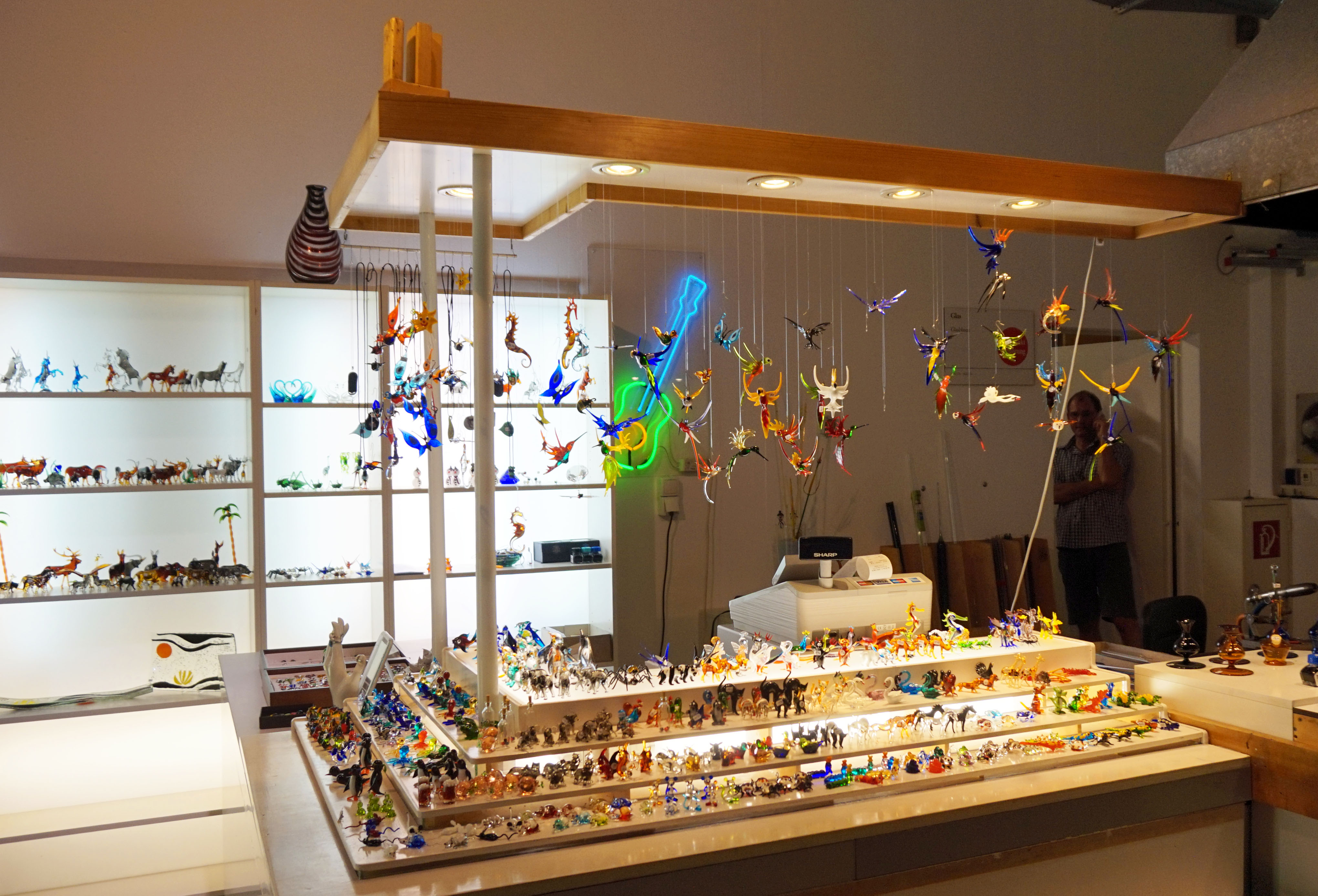
Small lampworked animals and figures in the museum shop of Deutsches Museum in Munich, Germany.

Lampworking can be done with many types of glass, but the most common are soda-lime glass and lead glass, both called "soft glass", and borosilicate glass, often called "hard glass". Leaded glass tubing was commonly used in the manufacture of neon signs, and many US lampworkers used it in making blown work. Some colored glass tubing that was also used in the neon industry was used to make small colored blown work, and colored glass rod, of compatible lead and soda-lime glasses, was used to ornament both clear and colored tubing. The use of soft glass tubing has been fading, owing partly to environmental concerns and health risks but mainly to the adoption of borosilicate glass by most lampworkers, especially since the introduction of colored glasses compatible with clear borosilicate.

Soft glass is sometimes useful because it melts at lower temperatures, but it does not react well to rapid temperature changes as borosilicate glass does. Soft glass expands and contracts much more than hard glass when heated/cooled, and must be kept at an even temperature while being worked, especially if the piece being made has sections of varying thickness. If thin areas cool below the "stress point", shrinking can cause a crack. Hard glass, or borosilicate, shrinks much less, so is more forgiving. Borosilicate is just like regular silicate glass (SiO_{2}), but it has a more flexible molecular structure from being doped with boron.

Glasses to be fused together must be selected for compatibility with each other, both chemically (more of a concern with soft glass than borosilicate) and in terms of coefficient of thermal expansion (COE) [CTE is also used for Coefficient of Thermal Expansion.] Glasses with incompatible COE, mixed together, can create powerful stresses within a finished piece as it cools, cracking or violently shattering the piece. Chemically, some colors can react with each other when melted together. This may cause desirable effects in coloration, metallic sheen, or an aesthetically pleasing "web effect". It also can cause undesirable effects such as unattractive discoloration, bubbling, or devitrification.

Borosilicate glass is considered more forgiving to work with, as its lower COE makes it less apt to crack during flameworking than soda-lime glass or lead glass. However, it has a narrower working temperature range than the soft glasses, has fewer available colors, and is considerably more expensive. Also, its working range is at higher temperatures than the soft glasses, requiring the use of oxygen/gas flames instead of air/gas. In addition to producing a hotter flame, the use of pure oxygen allows more control over the flame's oxidizing or reducing properties, which is necessary because some coloring chemicals in borosilicate glass react with any remaining oxygen in the flame either to produce the desired final color or to discolor if extra oxygen is present.

Lead glass has the broadest working range of the three glasses, and holds its heat better when it is out of the flame. This gives one more time to adjust one's work when blowing hollow forms. It is also less likely to crack while being worked in making pieces of variable thickness than is soda-lime glass.

== Types of glass ==
=== Raw materials ===
Glass is available in a wide range of shapes, sizes, and colors for the lampworker. Most lampworkers use glass produced by commercial manufactures in the shape of rod, tube, sheet or frit. Glass rods are manufactured in various sizes, as small as 1 mm and as large as 50 mm or more. Glass rod is also made in different shapes like: square, triangle or half round rod. Glass tubes are also offered in a range of diameters, colors, and profiles like: scalloped, twisted or lined tubing. Crushed glass particles that have been sifted to specific sizes are known as frit or power. Sheet glass is produced in varying thickness and can be cut and shaped before being worked in the flame. The glass industry has seen steady growth in the past few decades that continues to expand the types and forms of glass available to lampworkers.

=== Soda lime glass ===
The most popular glass for lampworking is soda-lime glass, which is available pre-colored. Soda-lime glass is the traditional mix used in blown furnace glass, and lampworking glass rods were originally hand-drawn from the furnace and allowed to cool for use by lampworkers. Today soda-lime, or "soft" glass is manufactured globally, including Italy, Germany, Czech Republic, China and America.

Soda-lime glass is composed primarily of silica, soda, and lime. Because it has a higher coefficient of thermal expansion than borosilicate glass, careful annealing in a kiln is important to relieve thermal stress and prevent cracking. In lampworking, it is widely used making breads, sculptural pieces, and decorative glass objects.

=== Lead ===
In addition to soda lime glass, lampworkers can use lead glass. Lead glasses are distinguished by their lower viscosity, heavier weight, and somewhat greater tolerance for COE mismatches.

=== Borosilicate ===
Lampworkers often use borosilicate glass, a very hard glass requiring greater heat. Borosilicate originated as laboratory glass, but it has recently become available in color to the studio artist from a number of companies. At one time, soft (soda lime and lead) and hard (borosilicate) glasses had distinctly different looking palettes, but demand by soft-glass artists for the silver strike colors, and the development of the bright, cadmium based 'crayon colors' by Glass Alchemy in the boro line, has diminished the distinctions between them.

=== Quartz ===
Lampworkers can also work with fused quartz tube and rod. A hydrogen and oxygen torch is used to work quartz as it requires higher temperatures than other types of glass. Quartz is resistant to extreme temperature variations and chemical corrosion, making it especially useful in scientific applications. Quartz has recently gained popularity in artistic glass work but is only available a few limited colors.

== Tools ==
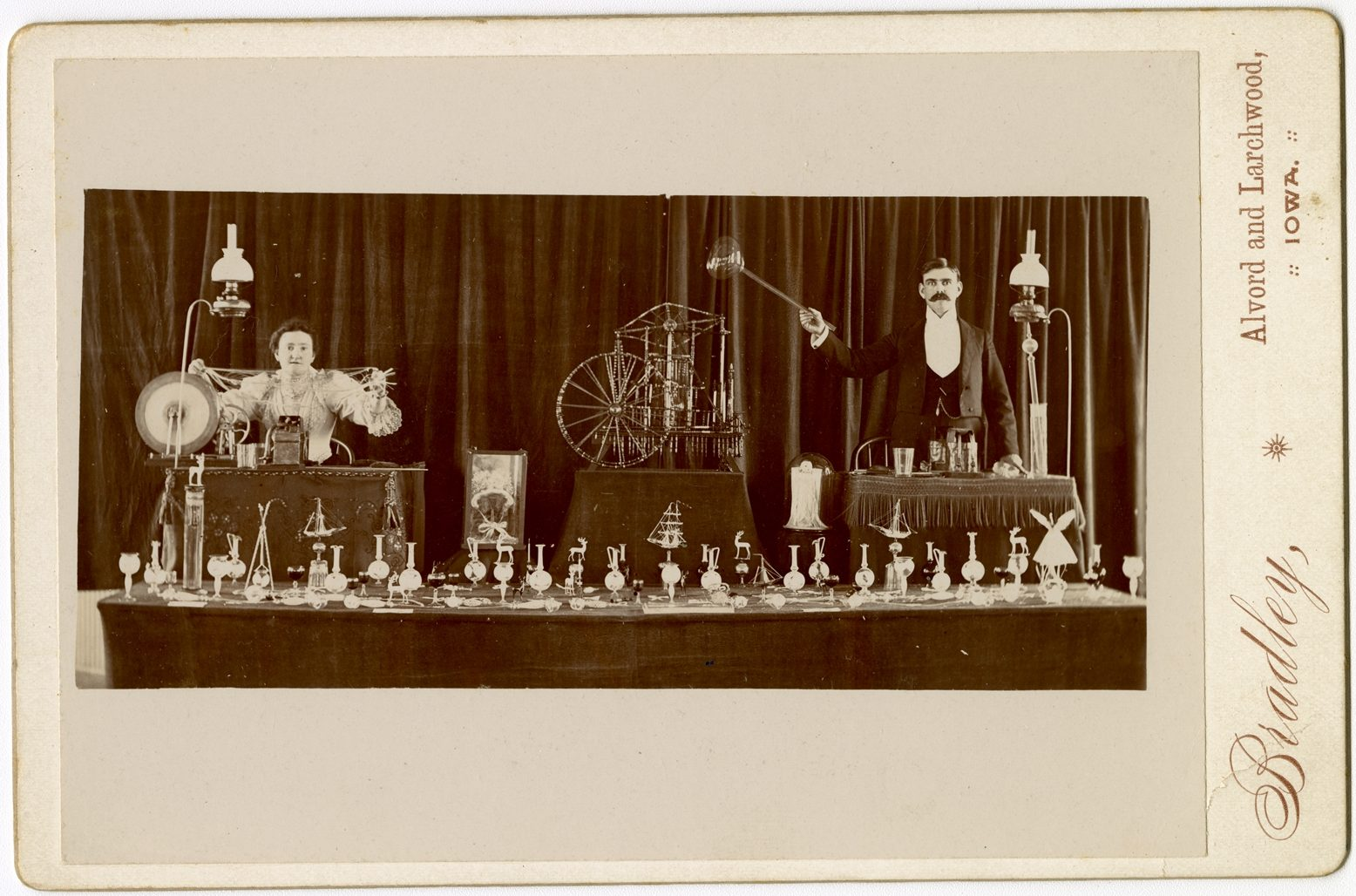
Itinerant glassworker exhibition with spinning wheel and steam engine, 1904

Tools for lampworking are similar to those used in glassblowing. Graphite is frequently used for the working surfaces of lampworking tools because of its ability to withstand high temperatures, low coefficient of friction, and resistance to sticking to the molten glass. Steel is used where greater strength is required. Some molds may be made from fruitwoods, but primarily wood is used for handles of lampworking tools. Brass may be used for working surfaces where a higher coefficient of friction is desired.

- Bench burner – A torch that is fixed to the bench which provides a stationary flame.
- Hand torch – The hand torch allows for more maneuverability of the flame, commonly used on glassworking lathes where there is reduced maneuverability of the piece
- Kiln – the kiln is used to garage and anneal the glass, protecting the piece from thermal shock and relieving thermal stress.
- Marver – flat surfaces used to roll glass upon in order to shape, smooth or consolidate applied decoration, typically made of graphite or steel.
- Paddle – A graphite or metal marver attached to a handle
- Reamer – A piece of graphite or brass on a handle used to enlarge holes.
- Blowhose/swivel assembly – A hose, usually latex, is connected to the blowpipe via a hollow swivel, allowing the lampworker to blow into hollow glass forms while rotating them.
- Tungsten pick – The extreme temperature resistance of tungsten makes it ideal for raking (dragging glass around on the surface), or to bore a hole through the glass.
- Shears – Steel shears are used to cut the hot glass.
- Claw grabbers – Metal tool found in various configurations which allows the hot glass to be securely held and rotated, commonly used for finishing pieces after they have been removed from the blowpipe or pontil.
- Lathe – The glassworking lathe allows for precise rotation and manipulation of glass. They are especially suited for larger scale work that may be difficult or tiring to turn by hand.

== General methods of beadmaking ==
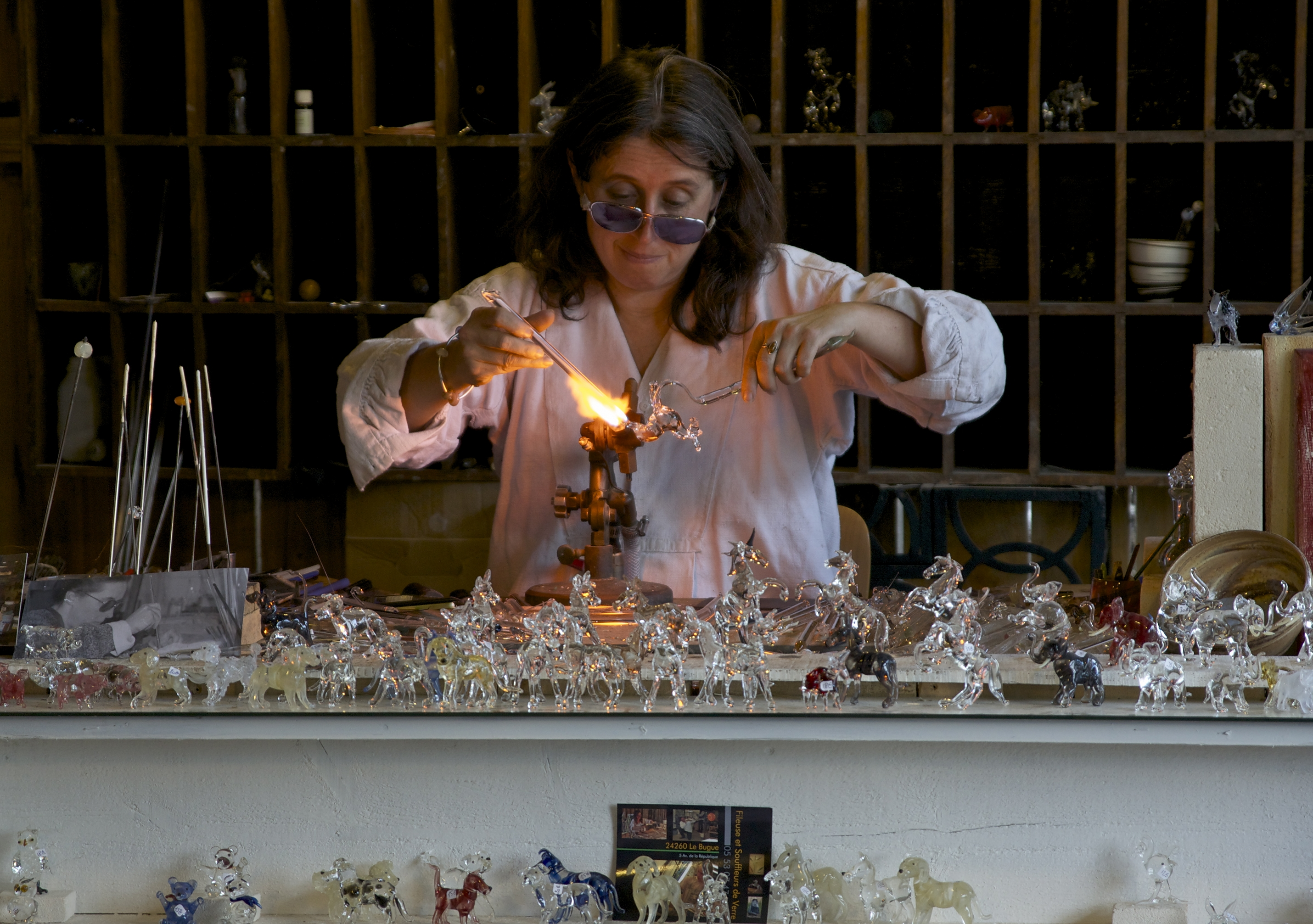
Demonstration of the lampworking process

After designing a piece, a lampworker must plan how to construct it. Once ready to begin, the lampworker slowly introduces glass rod or tubing into the flame to prevent cracking from thermal shock. The glass is heated until molten and wound around a specially coated steel mandrel, forming the base bead. The coating is an anti-fluxing bead release agent that will allow the bead to be easily removed from the mandrel, either a clay-based substance or boron nitride. It can then be embellished or decorated using a variety of techniques and materials. All parts of the workpiece must be kept at similar temperatures lest they shatter. Once finished, the piece must be annealed in a kiln to prevent cracking or shattering.

Annealing, in glass terms, is heating a piece until its temperature reaches a stress-relief point; that is, a temperature at which the glass is still too hard to deform, but is soft enough for internal stresses to ease. The piece is then allowed to heat-soak until its temperature is uniform throughout. The time necessary for this depends on the type of glass and thickness of the thickest section. The piece is then slowly cooled at a predetermined rate until its temperature is below a critical point, (between 900 and 1000 degrees Fahrenheit), at which it cannot generate internal stresses, and then can safely be dropped to room temperature. This relieves the internal stresses, resulting in a piece which should last for many years. Glass that has not been annealed may crack or shatter due to a seemingly minor temperature change or other shock.

== Additional techniques for lampworked beads ==
Beads can be sandblasted, or they can be faceted, using lapidary techniques. "Furnace glass" beads, which are more elaborate versions of the old Seed bead technique, are widely made today. Chevron beads are multi-layer beads once exclusively made using hot-shop techniques to produce the original tubing; but now some lampworkers make similar designs on their torches before lapping the ends to reveal the various layered colors. As torches get bigger and more powerful, the cross-over between lampworking and furnace glass continues to increase.

Fuming is a technique that has been developed and popularized by Bob Snodgrass since the 70's and 80's. Fuming consists of heating silver or gold in the flame, so that the metals vaporize or "fume" microscopically thin layers of particles onto the glass. These particles stick to the hot glass surface changing its color with interesting effects. Silver turns clear glass into a yellowish color, giving shades of blues and greens when backed with a dark color, while gold turns clear glass shades of pinks and reds. The precious metal coating becomes increasingly visible the more the glass is fumed.

== Brief history of modern lampworked beads ==
Lampworked beads (with the exception of Asian and African beadmaking) have generally been for the last four hundred years or so the province of Italian, and, later, Bohemian lampworkers who kept the techniques secret. Thirty or so years ago, some American artists started experimenting with the form. Their early efforts, by today's standards, were crude, as there was almost no documentation, and none of the modern tools. However, they shared their information, and some of them started small businesses developing tools, torches and other equipment.

This group eventually formed the basis for the International Society of Glass Beadmakers.

== See also ==
- Glass beadmaking
- Scientific glassblowing
- Leopold and Rudolf Blaschka
