= Mary Herring =

Australian doctor and community worker

Dame Mary Herring DBE, CStJ
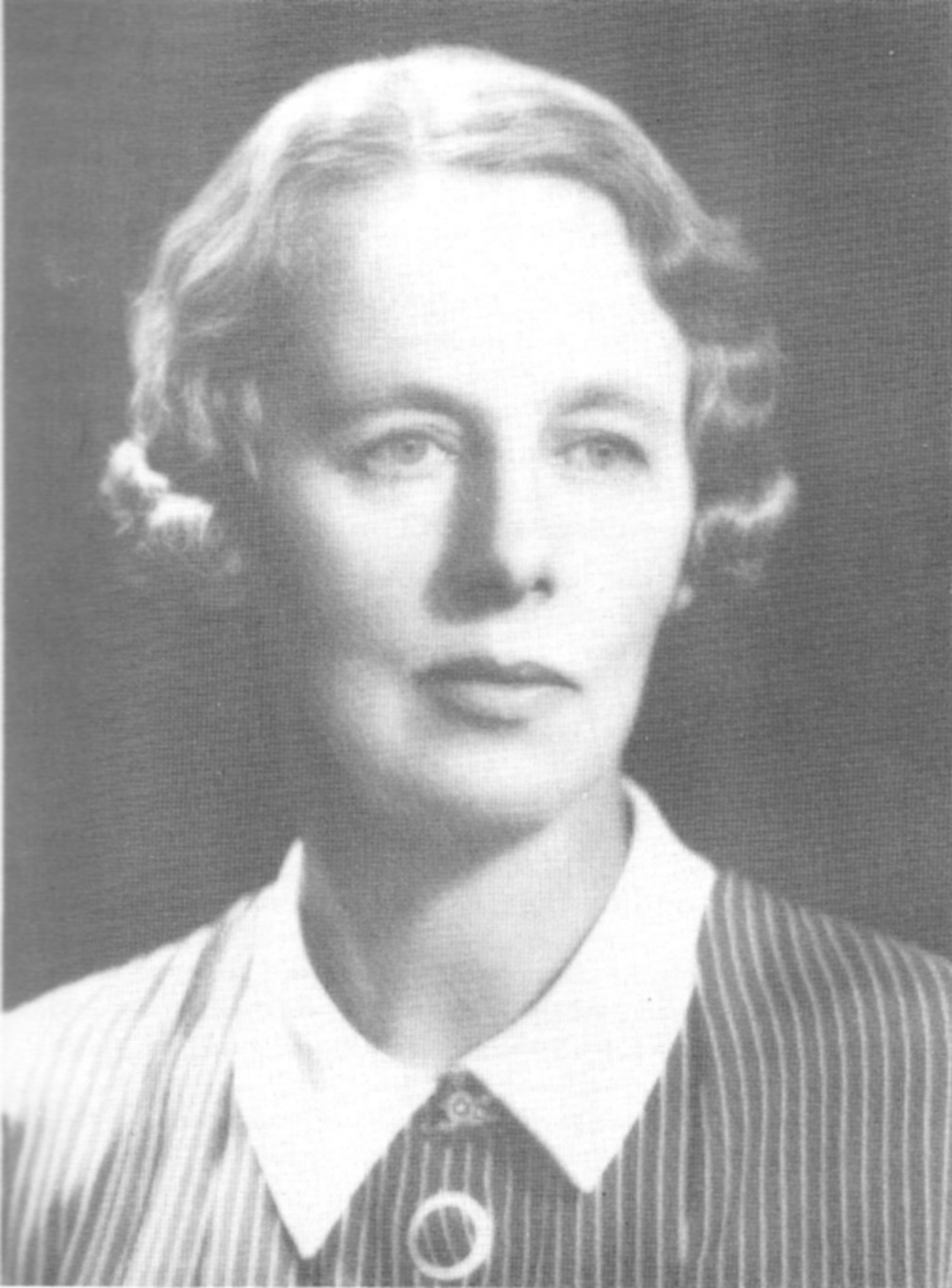
- Born: Mary Ranken Lyle; 31 March 1895; Carlton, Victoria
- Died: 26 October 1981 (aged 86); Camberwell, Victoria
- Occupation: Physician
- Years active: 1921–1945
- Spouse(s): Sir Edmund Herring (1922–81; her death); 3 daughters

Dame Mary Ranken Herring, Lady Herring, DBE, CStJ (née Lyle; 31 March 1895 – 26 October 1981) was an Australian medical practitioner and community worker.

A graduate of the University of Melbourne, where she studied medicine and excelled at sports, Mary qualified as a general practitioner in 1921 and became a resident surgeon at Royal Melbourne Hospital. Her work was mainly with poor women, many of whom lived in unsanitary conditions and had inadequate diets. The social mores of the time often kept young women ignorant of matters dealing with sex and pregnancy. She recognised that pregnant women in particular needed more information about what was happening to them, and provided information on birth control at a time when many doctors and a large segment of the community were opposed to it. "She broke taboos", Della Hilton later wrote, and "made forbidden subjects not only matters for discussion, but for action".

In addition to her medical work, Mary supported women's sports and was patron of many charities. During World War II she helped form the AIF Women's Association. She served on its Welfare Subcommittee, looking after the needs of soldiers' families, and was president of the association from 1943 to 1946. In recognition of her medical and charitable work, she was made a Commander of the Order of St John in 1953, and a Dame Commander of the Order of the British Empire in 1960 "for services to nursing in Victoria".

== Early life ==
Mary Ranken Lyle was born in the Melbourne suburb of Carlton on 31 March 1895, the eldest of four children of Sir Thomas Ranken Lyle, a mathematical physicist, and his wife, Frances Isobel Clare née Millear. She attended Toorak College between 1906 and 1912, where she excelled both academically and at sport, playing tennis, hockey, netball, and cricket, and competing in swimming. She was head girl in 1911 and 1912.

In 1913 she entered the University of Melbourne as a medical student. She was captain of the women's tennis and hockey teams, obtaining University Sporting Blue in both sports. In 1918 she had met Edmund (Ned) Herring, then a young Australian captain in the British Army on leave from the Macedonian front of the Great War.

During her training, she worked with the district nurses, visiting families in the Melbourne's less affluent suburbs. Her ambition was to become a doctor who improved the lives of women and children. Women of her own social class did not normally work after they married, so marriage was not something she had intended. In 1919, with the war over, she wrote to Ned urging him to complete his Rhodes Scholarship studies before returning to Australia.

She met her future husband, Ned Herring, when he arrived back in Melbourne at last on 26 November 1920. She graduated with her dual Bachelor of Medicine and Surgery (MB, BS) degree in March 1921, achieving first-class honours in all subjects, with a first in medicine and fourth in surgery. She won the Keith Levi Memorial Scholarship in medicine and the Sameson Prize in clinical medicine, and became a resident surgeon at Royal Melbourne Hospital under Sir Alan Newton.

Ned was so supportive of her career plans that Mary reconsidered marriage, although she knew both their parents would disapprove. With her studies completed, Mary and Ned became formally engaged at Easter in 1921, and they were married on 6 April 1922 at Toorak Presbyterian Church. They had three daughters: Mary Cecile (Molly) in 1924, Judith Ann (Judy) in 1926, and Margaret Lyle in 1933. Molly would later become a doctor like her mother.

== Career ==
Richard Fetherston had established a Baby Health Center in Prahran in 1920 that provided post-natal care. His experience soon showed that his workload would be greatly reduced if antenatal care were provided, with mothers being monitored throughout their pregnancies. He asked Herring if she would be willing to establish such a clinic, which would be open one day a week.

The new clinic opened in Prahran, not far from the shopping centre in Chapel Street in 1926. Herring had the district nurses spread word of the clinic. The clinic was the first of its kind in Melbourne, and became a model for a similar clinic established by Herring in South Melbourne in 1940. At the time she started work at the Prahran clinic, she was a mother herself and pregnant with Judy, a circumstance of great interest to the women who sought advice or treatment at the clinic. Her work was mainly with poor women, many of whom lived in unsanitary conditions and had inadequate diets.

Herring joined the Melbourne District Nursing Society in 1931 and was its vice president from 1943 to 1953. She banded together with George Simpson and Victor Wallace to establish the Women's Welfare Clinic to offer advice on birth control, at a time when many doctors and a large segment of the community were opposed to it. This clinic functioned for one day a week until 1945 when it was discontinued, as the advice it offered could by then be obtained elsewhere. The social mores of the time often kept young women ignorant of matters dealing with sex and pregnancy, but Herring recognised that pregnant women in particular needed more information about what was happening to them. "She broke taboos", Della Hilton later wrote, and "made forbidden subjects not only matters for discussion, but for action".

== Later life ==
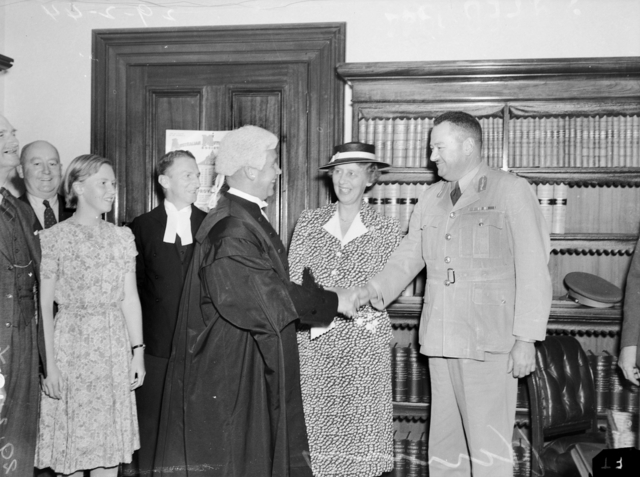
Lady Herring (with hat) looks on as Sir Edmund Herring, the new Chief Justice of Victoria, greets guests at an informal reception in his rooms.

Ned joined the Second Australian Imperial Force (AIF) soon after the outbreak of World War II in September 1939, and Herring banded together with a number of soldiers' wives to form the AIF Women's Association in 1940. She served on its Welfare Subcommittee, looking after the needs of soldiers' families, and was president of the association from 1943 to 1946.

She became Lady Herring in May 1943 when Ned was created a Knight Commander of the Order of the British Empire. On 2 February 1944, the Premier of Victoria, Albert Dunstan, appointed Ned as Chief Justice of the Supreme Court of Victoria. For much of the next 30 years he would also serve as lieutenant governor of Victoria, this being a common additional function of the chief justice. When Ned became acting governor for eight months in February 1949, Herring found Government House to be in a state of disrepair. She successfully lobbied James Kennedy for funds for its refurbishment, and supervised the work personally.

A foundation member of the Toorak College council in 1927, Herring served as its president from 1947 to 1948 and again from 1960 to 1970. She played tennis and golf, and when her two eldest daughters began playing hockey at school, Herring's interest in hockey was rekindled. A strong believer in the principle that women and not men should administer women's sports, she became a member of the Victorian Women's Amateur Sports Council, and was later the patron of the Victorian Women's Hockey Association. Players visiting from interstate would often stay at her home. This was extended to overseas visitors during the 1956 Summer Olympics, which were held in Melbourne.

In 1953, Herring travelled to London to attend the Coronation of Queen Elizabeth II, which she viewed from a seat inside Westminster Abbey. In a ceremony at Buckingham Palace on 10 July 1953, the new Queen made Herring a Commander of the Order of St John in recognition of her charity work. This charity work was extensive. Herring was a foundation member and first president of the Victorian Council of Social Service when it was formed in 1946, and chairman of the Vera Scantlebury Brown Memorial Trust from 1946 to 1979. Herring and Vera Scantlebury Brown had both attended Toorak College, and were also medical students at the University of Melbourne together.

Herring was a deputy-president of the Victorian division of the Australian Red Cross from 1944 to 1963, of the Victoria League from 1945 to 1972, and of the Australian council of the Save the Children Fund from 1962 to 1967. On 11 June 1960, she was created a Dame Commander of the Order of the British Empire "for services to nursing in Victoria". Mary Herring Hall at Toorak College was named in her honour in 1964.

== Death ==
Before her death on 26 October 1981, aged 86, following a long illness, Herring planned her own funeral service, requesting that no announcements be made until after she was buried. In her final days, she moved to Ned's nursing home in Camberwell, Victoria, to be with him. A small private service was held on 28 October 1981. She also planned a state funeral at St Paul's Cathedral for Ned, who died a few months after her on 5 January 1982.
