= Jorg Meyer =

Glass blower (1940–2021)

Jörg C. Meyer (December 31, 1940 – May 1, 2021) was the official scientific glassblower of the University of California, Irvine.

== Life and career ==
Meyer was born in Berlin, Germany, and learned glassblowing from his father and grandfather, who both worked in the same trade. He traveled to Australia, and blew glass for the Australian National University in Canberra, before moving again to Southern California. He was hired at UC Irvine by chemist Frank Sherwood Rowland at the founding of the university in 1965, and worked with Rowland and Mario J. Molina on their Nobel-prize-winning research on ozone depletion. As well as making scientific equipment for chemists, physicists, and atmospheric scientists, his creations included a glass baseball mitt for Ralph J. Cicerone and a non-functional glass clarinet for UCI chemist Harold W. Moore.

Meyer also developed stainless steel machinery for drying and purifying solvents, replacing previous methods using glassware that had a tendency to shatter. While working at UC Irvine in 1967, Meyer and his wife Allison founded a small company, GlassContour (now Seca Solvent Systems), through which he commercialized this purification process. The Meyers sold GlassContour in 2004 and in 2010 founded a second company, JC Meyer Solvent Systems, which also sells Meyer's stainless steel purification systems.

As well as for his glass and solvent purification work, Meyer is known for his appearance in a National Geographic magazine photo in 1965, riding a 40-foot whale shark as a professional diver in Australia. He was also a falconer and helped to rehabilitate injured birds of prey.

In 2015, Meyer won the annual award for outstanding staff achievement of the UC Irvine Alumni Association.

Meyer died on May 1, 2021, at the age of 80.
