= Scientific glassblowing =

Specialty field of glass blowing

Scientific glassblowing is a specialty field of lampworking used in industry, science, art and design used in research and production. Scientific glassblowing has been used in chemical, pharmaceutical, electronic and physics research including Galileo's thermometer, Thomas Edison's light bulb, and vacuum tubes used in early radio, TV and computers. More recently, the field has helped advance fiber optics, lasers, atomic and subatomic particle research, advanced communications development and semiconductors. The field combined hand skills using lathes and torches with modern computer assisted furnaces, diamond grinding and lapping machines, lasers and ultra-sonic mills.

== Scientific glassblowing schools ==
=== Degree programs ===
Salem Community College in Carney's Point, New Jersey offers the only degree program in the United States, an Associate in Applied Science, with a focus on the construction of scientific glass apparatus. Students come from throughout the United States and from around the world to develop this specialized skill at Salem Community College.

Alfred University offers a masters program in glass science and a PhD with a blend of theoretical and applied studies similar to degree programs in materials science and engineering.

=== Universities offering courses ===
The following is the list of recognized universities that provide courses in scientific glassblowing:

- University of Alabama
- Arizona State University
- Australian National University
- Grinnell College
- University of Pittsburgh
- Salem Community College
- University of Utah
- Yale University
- University of Oklahoma
- Purdue University
- University of Georgia

== Notable scientific glassblowers ==
- John Calley (engineer)
- Clarence Madison Dally (killed by X-ray exposure in the course of his work)
- Heinrich Geißler (invented the Geissler tube)
- Jorg Meyer
- Mitsugi Ohno
- Joseph Patrick Slattery (radiography pioneer blew much of his own lab glassware)
- Arthur Compton
- Narine & Anthony Baney (Father and Son Scientific Glassblowers with University of Maryland, Baltimore County)

== American Scientific Glassblowers Society ==
The American Scientific Glassblowers Society (ASGS) is an association for scientific glassblowers and provides continuing education programs. The community is relatively small, with approximately 650 members.
