= Walter Drowley Filmer =

Australian engineer & scientist (1865-1944)

Walter Drowley Filmer (1 September 1865 – 24 August 1944) was an early pioneer of X-rays in Australia, a wireless engineer, for a time ran the British Royal Train, and a world class entomologist that discovered several new species in his homeland. Filmer was a naturalist and established a private collection at his residence that thousands of people visited.

== Life and Times ==
In 1865, Filmer was born in Maitland, New South Wales, Australia. He was the son of William Filmer (1828–1902) and Amy Filmer née Hatton (1831–1901). He married Mary Anne Eliza née Chessell (1868–1951) in 1890 in Sydney. The couple had 4 children: son, Walter Harold Alexander Filmer (1892–1964), born on 10 February 1892 in Sydney; daughter, Mary Filmer (1895–1895), born in 1895 in Petersham; son, Leroy Drowley Filmer (1902–1976), born on 5 April 1902 in Newcastle; and son, Eric Filmer (1903–1986), born 10 December 1903 in Toronto. In 1944, he died at home at Lake Macquarie.

In 1876, at the age of 11, he was apprenticed to a boot maker. In 1884, by the age of 19, Filmer became an assistant telegraph line repairer and operator with the New South Wales Post Office. From 1885 to 1912, he was appointed to the New South Wales Government Railways as telegraph officer. In 1890, Filmer was selected to go to England as a cadet to study railway electrical science and safety. In England he lived with an uncle at the Tower of London. At one point he found himself in charge of the British Royal Train that ran from London to Edinburgh. After completion of railway studies in England in 1891, Filmer returned to New South Wales. With newly acquired knowledge and skills, he received appointment as Electrical Inspector for Railways and remained in that capacity until retirement in 1908.

In 1909, Filmer was appointed head instructor of electricity for mines at Newcastle Technical College, Maitland Technical College and Cessnock Technical College and taught Applied Electricity. These schools were all mining technical colleges. From 1909 to 1931, he was physics master at Newcastle Technical College, and retired in 1931.

== Professional Service ==
- Institute of Electrical Engineers (London), member
- Institute of Engineers (Australia), founding member
- Maitland Scientific Society, member

== Wireless and X-Rays ==
Filmer received an appointment as wireless engineer to the Douglas Mawson Expedition to the South Pole, but was unable to accept since the Railway Department would not grant him a release to participate. Filmer and his brother Bert Filmer operated one of the first X-ray installation in Australia, three days after cables were received in Australia that announced the discovery of X-rays. From 1896 to 1910, the Filmer brothers were appointed Honorary Electricians at Newcastle Hospital and were X-rays operators at Newcastle Hospital.

== Entomologist ==
Filmer was interested in studies that involved entomology and marine life. He researched parasites, a noteworthy achievement was the discovery of a new family: ‘’Cestoda genera’’, that became known as Filmeric. He had an extensive collection of insects, comprising several thousand samples, and perhaps one of the leading private collections at the time. Filmer developed a keen interest in field work that involved spiders and teamed with Dr. Jiří Baum of the Prague Museum, the Czech zoologist and a leading world authority on spiders. Filmer performed research with Dr. Robin Tillyard on fossil insects. He also teamed with John Mitchell, of Newcastle, on fossil trilobites, and was honored with a species being named after him.

In 1930, Filmer collected 3 cestodes at Tuggerah from a fresh water tortoise, Chelodina longicollis, and submitted these to the South Australian Museum for identification. Thomas Harvey Johnston reported that this was the first known occurrence of an Amphilinid to be collected in the Southern Hemisphere, and the only known instance of a member of the order in a reptile, the other known species described, one example from sturgeons in the Northern Hemisphere, two from a primitive fresh-water fish from northern South America, and one from a marine fish off the coast of Ceylon.

== Accolades ==
As previously mentioned, Filmer is credited in the animalia and insecta world, with species named in his honor for significant contributions.

Australia is one of the few countries to recognize a group of people for a major achievement where the group happened to work independently in different locations in Australia. These significant achievements by 3 individuals are disputed even to this day. Not the historical fact that the events occurred, but the claim of who accomplished what first, and who should receive credit for being the first in Australia to perform medical radiography. Australia Post decided a fair way was to depict all three individuals on a postage stamp, issued to coincided and commemorate the 100th anniversary of Wilhelm Röntgen’s discovery of X-rays. On 7 September 1995, Father Joseph Patrick Slattery, Thomas Lyle, and Walter Drowley Filmer were recognized as the pioneers of X-ray technology in Australia.
