= Bob Snodgrass =

American lampworker

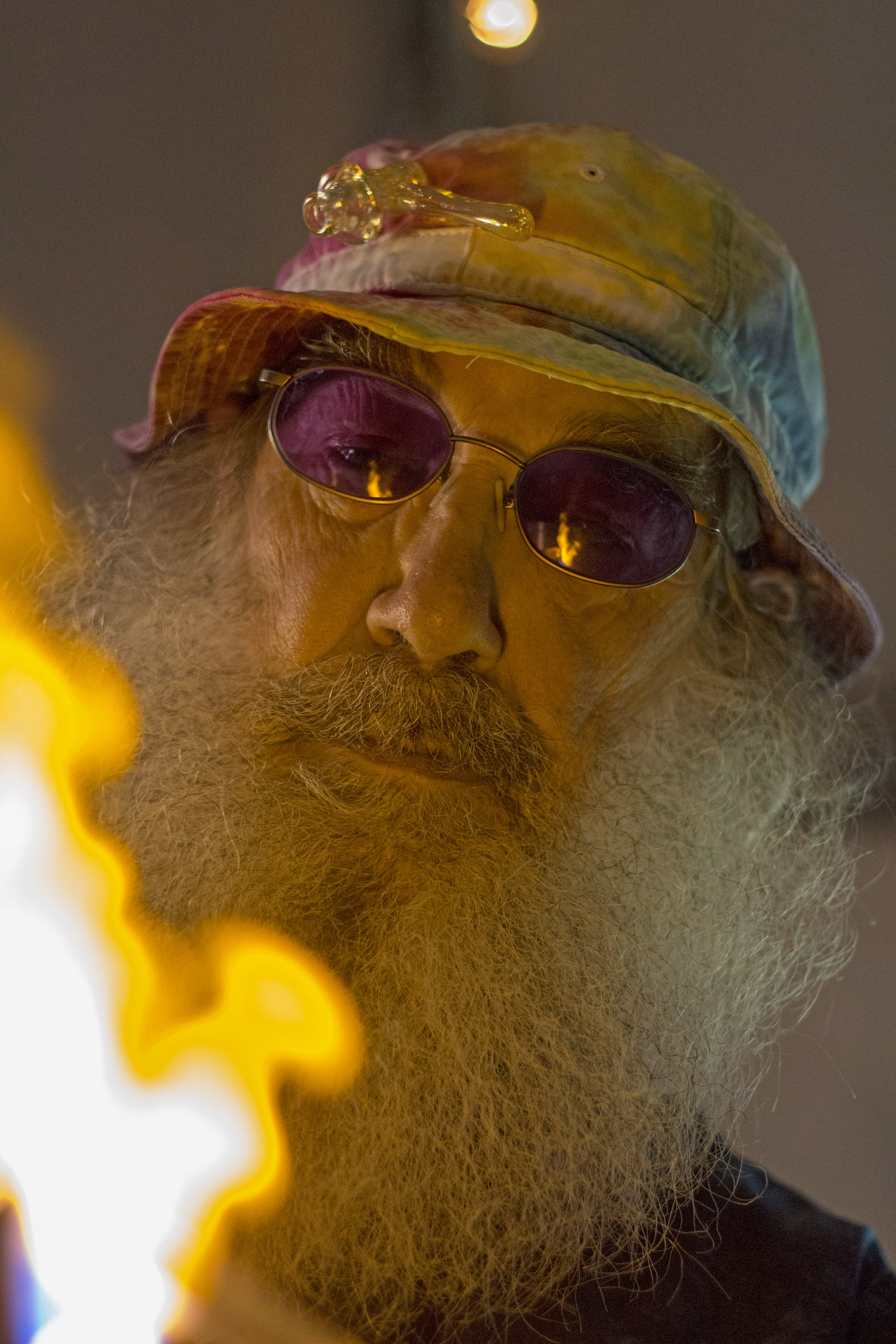
Bob Snodgrass, Oregon DFO 2019 (Photo by Connor McHugh/Pyroscopic)

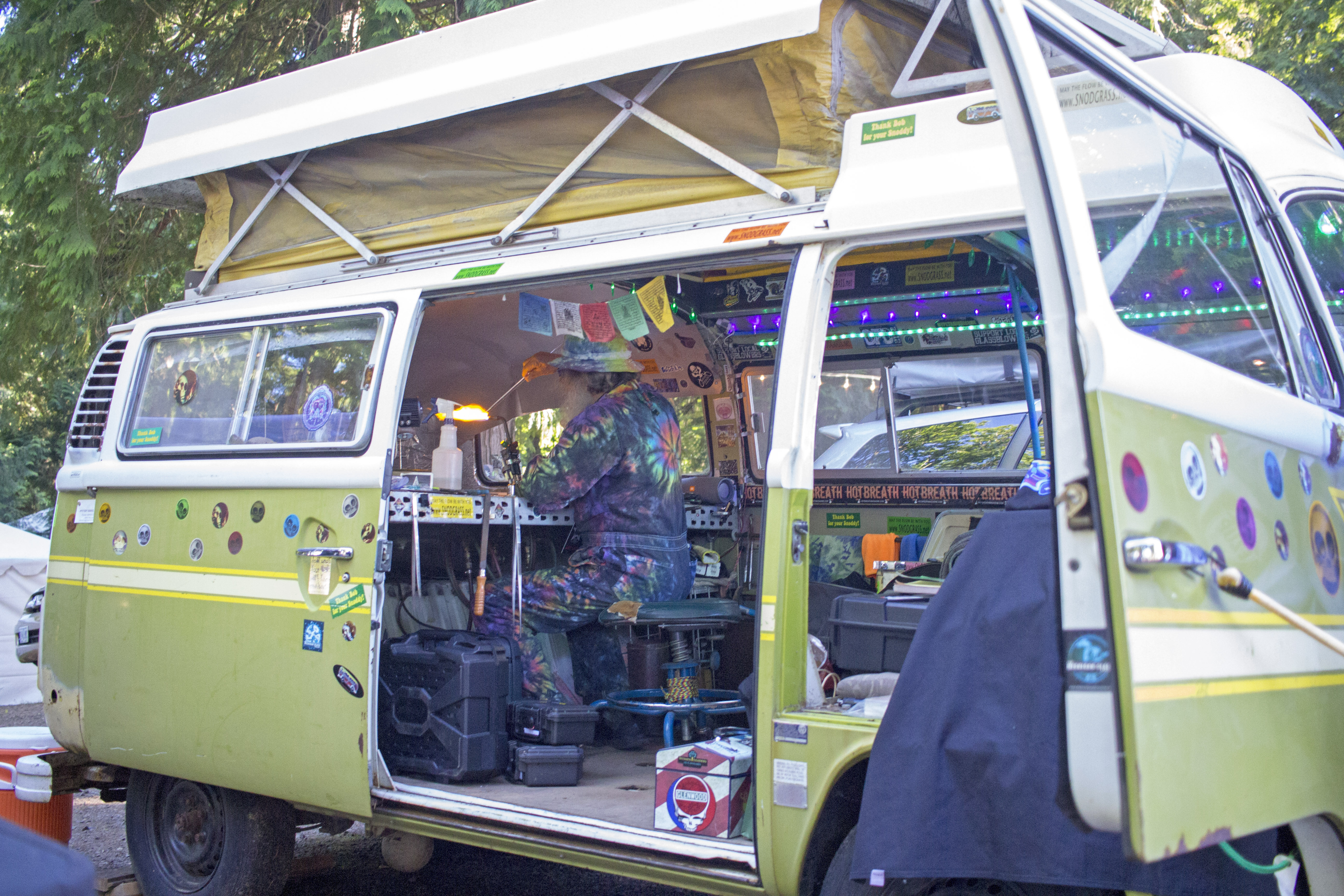
Bob Snodgrass blowing glass in his VW Bus at DFO in Oregon 2019. (Photo by Connor McHugh/PYROSCOPIC)

Bob Snodgrass is an American lampworker known for his contributions to the art of glass pipe-making and glass art. He began lampworking in 1971 while learning from and working with Chuck Murphy for a few years.

Snodgrass purchased his first torch in 1974 while living in Independence, Missouri where he began to hone his craft over the next several years. He moved back to Ohio and a few other states selling his work at local arts & crafts festivals, flea markets and street fairs. In 1986 Bob, his wife and their youngest child moved into a bus and hit the road. They worked their way around the country doing all types of festivals and shows. On Easter weekend in 1987 Bob attended his first Grateful Dead show at Irvine. "I saw the crowd burst into dancing and thought this was so tribal I want to be part of this." From there Bob started following the Dead on tour and his craft quickly became sought after. Eventually they settled in Eugene, Oregon.

Snodgrass is credited with having invented (by accident, he says) color changing glass, a type of borosilicate glass mixed (fumed) with gold and/or silver, which changes colors as the dark resin builds up on the inside of the glass.

The documentary film Degenerate Art depicts the glass subculture that Snodgrass helped to create. He has been called the "Godfather of glass."
