= Jiří Baum =

Czech zoologist and writer

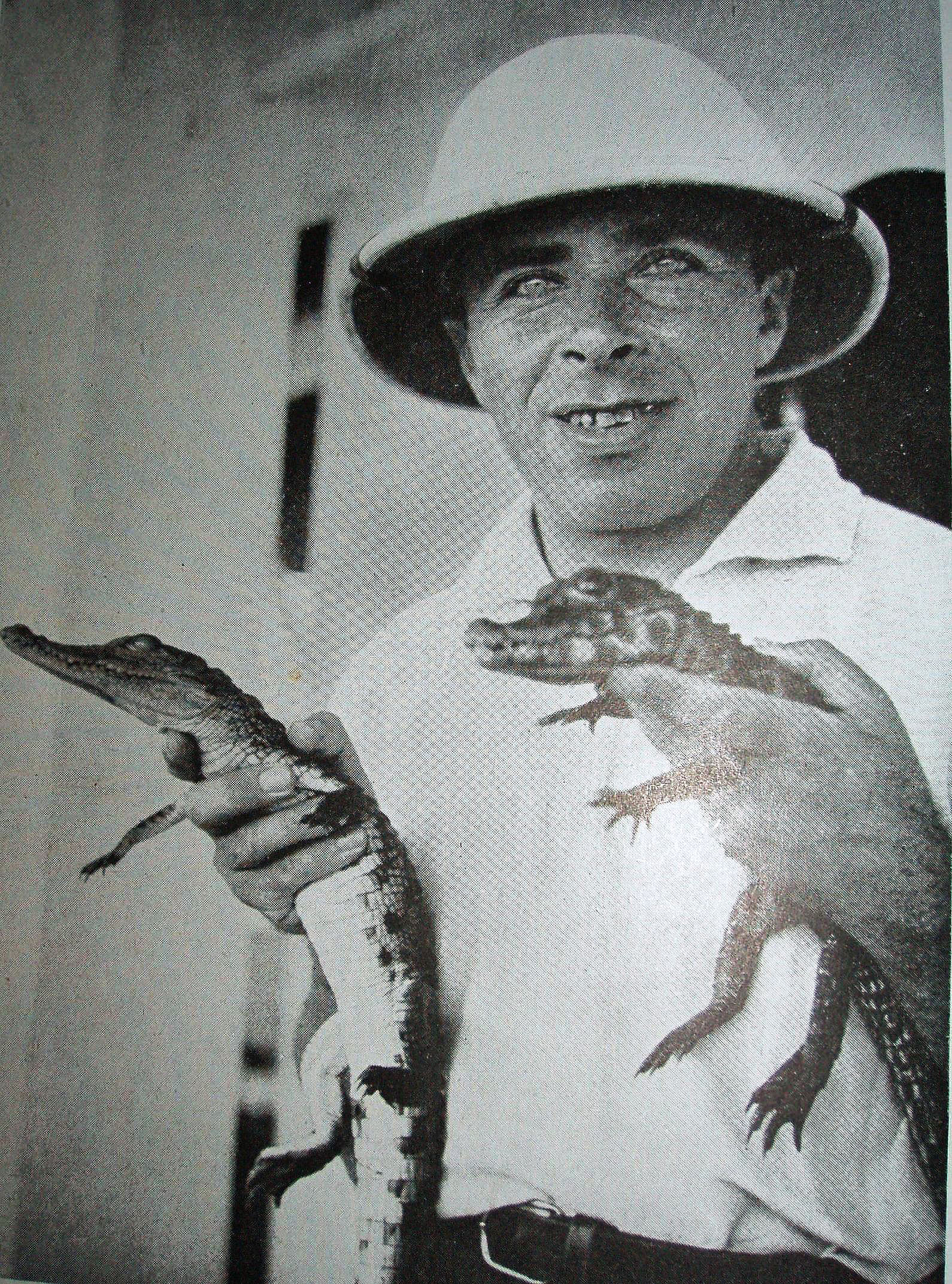

Jiří Baum (20 September 1900 – 1944, Warsaw) was a Czechoslovak zoologist, arachnologist, museum curator, explorer and writer. He served as the collector of the zoological department of the National Museum in Prague and is best known in his field for his 1933 book Through the African Wilderness and his 1935 zoological expedition in the Australian outback.

Baum was born in Prague in a business family. His father Josef Baum was a meat trader in Královské Vinohrady while his Františka Baumová was from a farming family in Nadějka. He went to the local grammar school before going to study in a business academy. In 1921 he and a classmate Viktor Mayer applied for a scholarship to the United States of America and he there for further studies. In 1922 he went to Brazil along with his sister Anna and her husband Robert Pollert to establish a farm. On returning he joined the natural sciences faculty at Charles University with a special interest in the arthropods. He travelled to Brazil in 1923-24 and West Africa in 1927 along with Albert Pilát (1903-1974). He fell sick with malaria afterwards. He received a doctorate in 1928 with a thesis on the spiders of Bohemia. Shortly after that he travelled to Malaysia and learned the Malay language. He wrote books for children and several travelogues. He took an interest in languages and learned Arabic, Swahili and Malay. In 1930 he translated a Malay fairy tale in "Pa Belalang". In 1931 he drove across Africa with the sculptor František V. Foit in a Tatra campervan. He took pictures documenting the travel. On his travels across Australia, Baum teamed with Walter Drowley Filmer due to his local expertise with spiders. One species of New-Guinean troglobitic cockroach Nocticola baumi was named in 2021 on honour of Jiří Baum. His last trip was to South Africa in 1938 and on his return he was involved in resistance against the Nazi invasion. He was arrested on June 10, 1943 and was transported to Terezín and later Auschwitz. He died in Warsaw from sepsis. A large collection of his photographs are now in the Archives of the National Museum in Prague.
