= Karen Willenbrink-Johnsen =

American glass artist

Karen Willenbrink-Johnsen (born 1960, Cincinnati, Ohio) is an American glass artist and educator. She attended Ohio University. She went on to work as an assistant to the glass artist William Morris. She competed on season 4 of Netflix series Blown Away (TV series). She often collaborates with her husband, Jasen Johnsen.

Willenbrink-Johnsen, along with fellow artists Tom Joyce and Judy Tuwaletstiwa, created the series Trinity/Ashes for the exhibition Living and Dying in the Nuclear Age for the City of Albuquerque.

She has taught in 15 countriesas well as the Corning Museum of Glass, the Pilchuck Glass School, and held a residency at the Museum of Glass.

== Artistry ==
Willenbrink-Johnson creates glass sculptures inspired by a passion for nature and adventure. Layering glass patterns and textures to freeze moments from the natural world in time.

== Education ==
- 1984 Bachelor of Fine Arts/Sculpture, Ohio University, Athens, OH 1984
- 1993-99 Glass Sculpture/Pino Signoretto, Pilchuck. Glass School, Stanwood, WA
- 1993 Apprentice to Maestro, Fournauser Chandelier Studio/Bruno Zanetti, Murano, Italy
- 1998 Mosaic/Felice Nittolo, Pilchuck Glass School, Stanwood, WA
- 2013 Raptors of the Pacific Northwest, Padilla Bay Center, Bow, WA

== Awards ==
- 1993 General Scholarship, Pilchuck Glass School, Stanwood, WA
- 1994 Louis Comfort Tiffany Award, Nominated, New York, NY
- 1994 Corning Award/Outstanding Student, Pilchuck Glass School, Stanwood, WA
- 1995 Newcomb Women’s Art Grant, Tulane University, New Orleans, LA
- 1998 General Scholarship, Pilchuck Glass School, Stanwood, WA
- 1999 Artist Trust and the Washington State Arts Council Grant, Seattle, WA
- 2006 Acquisition, Tacoma Art Museum, Tacoma, WA
