= Judy Tuwaletstiwa =

American artist and writer

- Born: 1941; Los Angeles, California
- Known for: painter, glass artist, book artist and writer
- Website: judytuwaletstiwa.com

Judy Tuwaletstiwa (born 1941 in Los Angeles, California) is an American multi-disciplinary artist and writer. The sculptural nature of her paintings are often described as elemental or cosmological in sensibility. She works across a broad range of media including kiln fired glass, fiber, clay, handmade paper and organic matter, such as feathers, quills, ash, sand and sticks. Tuwaletstiwa's work evokes visual storytelling, reflecting the ephemeral aspects of life and expressing the fragility, strength and vulnerability inherent in our human condition.

== Early life and education ==
Tuwaletstiwa attended the University of California at Berkeley, earning her BA in English Literature in 1962. She received her MAT in Medieval Literature from Harvard University in 1963.

== Career ==
Judy Tuwaletstiwa is a celebrated artist with a long career of residency fellowships, exhibitions, and collections to her name. She was the recipient of Mayor's Award for Excellence in the Arts 2022 and the New Mexico Governor's Award for Excellence in the Arts 2023. Her work was included in the exhibition "Abstracting Nature"(2025) at the Albuquerque Museum of Art, which focused on New Mexico women artists with enduring relationships to the land and creative practices centered on observation, research, and intuition.

Tuwaletstiwa was artist in residence at Pilchuck Glass School (1998 & 2000), Bullseye Glass Resource Center in Santa Fe (2012–2013), the Corning Museum of Glass (2017), and the Tamarind Institute (2017). She held Literary Fellowships at Ucross (2024) and Lannan Foundation (2000)

Her art lives in private, public, and museum collections, such as the New Mexico Museum of Art, Corning Museum of Glass, the Museum of Fine Arts, Houston, and the National Museum of Women in the Arts, among others.

Tuwaletstiwa, along with fellow artists Tom Joyce and Karen Willenbrink-Johnsen, created the series Trinity/Ashes for the exhibition Living and Dying in the Nuclear Age for the City of Albuquerque. Tuwaletstiwa's work is represented by Pie Projects, where she has exhibited in solo and group exhibitions, including "Momentum: Seven Contemporary Artists," in celebration of the 12th SITE SANTA FE International.

Tuwaletstiwa's publications include "The Canyon Poem" (1997); Mapping Water (2007); Glass(2017) and Chaco Series (2025). Special editions of her monographs reside in libraries such as the Corning Museum of Glass’ Rakow Library and Yale's Beinecke Rare Book & Manuscript Library.
