= Kovel (surname) =

Kovel is a surname. Notable people with the surname include

- Andi Kovel (born 1969), American artist and designer
- Joel Kovel (1936–2018), American eco-socialist author and academic
- Leonid Kovel (born 1986), Belarusian footballer
- Maksim Kovel (born 1999), Belarusian footballer
- Ralph and Terry Kovel, American authors
