= Big Brother 15 (American season) =

Coordinates: 34°8′40.12″N 118°23′20.71″W

Big Brother
- Season 15
- Big Brother 15 title card
- Hosted by: Julie Chen
- No. of days: 90
- No. of houseguests: 16
- Winner: Andy Herren
- Runner-up: GinaMarie Zimmerman
- America's Favorite HouseGuest: Elissa Slater
- Companion shows: Big Brother: Live Chat; Big Brother: After Dark
- No. of episodes: 36

Release
- Original network: CBS
- Original release: June 26 – September 18, 2013

Additional information
- Filming dates: June 21 – September 18, 2013

Season chronology
- ← Previous; Season 14 Next → Season 16

Big Brother 15 is the fifteenth season of the American reality television series Big Brother. The season premiered on June 26, 2013, broadcast on CBS and Global in Canada, and ended with a 90-minute season finale on September 18, 2013, after 90 days of competition. Julie Chen returned as host. On September 18, 2013, Andy Herren was crowned the winner defeating GinaMarie Zimmerman in a 7-2 jury vote. Elissa Slater was voted as the season's America's Favorite HouseGuest.

This season was the last to be broadcast on 4:3 standard definition and would be broadcast on high-definition television in the future.

== Format ==
The format remains largely unchanged from previous seasons. The contestants, who are referred to as "HouseGuests", are sequestered in the Big Brother House with no contact to or from the outside world. Each week, the HouseGuests take part in several compulsory challenges that determine who will win food, luxuries, and power in the House. The winner of the weekly Head of Household competition is guaranteed a week of safety and nominates two fellow HouseGuests for eviction. After a HouseGuest becomes Head of Household, he or she is ineligible to take part in the next Head of Household competition. HouseGuests usually also take part in weekly Have vs. Have-Not competitions in which they are divided into either the "Haves" or the "Have-Nots" depending on their performance in the competition. HouseGuests that become "Have-Nots" for the week have to eat "Big Brother slop" along with a weekly food restriction (chosen by the viewing public), take cold showers, and sleep on beds that look like airplane seats. The winner of the Power of Veto competition wins the right to revoke the nomination of one of the nominated HouseGuests. If the Veto winner uses this power, the person (Head of Household or M.V.P.) who nominated the vetoed player must immediately nominate another HouseGuest for eviction.

On eviction night, all HouseGuests except for the Head of Household and the nominees vote to evict one of the three nominees. This compulsory vote is conducted in the privacy of the Diary Room by the host Julie Chen. In the event of a tie, the Head of Household casts the deciding vote, announcing it in front of the other HouseGuests. Unlike most other versions of Big Brother, the HouseGuests may discuss the nomination and eviction process openly and freely. The nominee with the greatest number of votes will be evicted from the House on the weekly live broadcast, exiting to an adjacent studio to be interviewed by Chen, after which the cycle begins again. HouseGuests may voluntarily leave the House at any time and those who break the rules may be expelled from the house by Big Brother. The final nine HouseGuests evicted during the season will vote for the winner on the season finale. These "Jury Members" will be sequestered in a separate house and will not be allowed to watch the show except for competitions and ceremonies that include all of the remaining HouseGuests. The jury members will not be shown any Diary Room interviews or any footage that may include strategy or details regarding nominations. Whereas in past seasons, the Jury consisted of the last seven evicted HouseGuests, this season increased the number of jurors to nine.

In a twist this season, one HouseGuest each week (ostensibly the one who is playing the "best game") is secretly chosen by the viewing public to be the "Big Brother M.V.P.". In the privacy of the Diary Room, this person nominates a third person to face eviction for the week; the choice is revealed to the remaining HouseGuests just prior to choosing players for the upcoming Veto competition. The identity of the week's M.V.P. is not told to the remaining HouseGuests; it is up to the M.V.P. to decide whether or not to divulge this information. In a further twist and unbeknownst to the HouseGuests, during weeks four, five, and six, the viewers chose the third nominee.

== HouseGuests ==
The cast of the fifteenth season of Big Brother. Top: Spencer, Elissa, David, Helen, Jeremy and Amanda Middle: Andy, Howard, Kaitlin, Judd, McCrae and GinaMarie Bottom: Candice, Aaryn, Nick and Jessie

Name	Age on entry	Occupation	Residence	Day entered	Result
Andy Herren	26	Professor	Chicago, Illinois	1	Winner; Day 90
GinaMarie Zimmerman	32	Pageant coordinator	New Dorp, New York	1	Runner-up; Day 90
Spencer Clawson	31	Train conductor	Conway, Arkansas	1	Evicted; Day 90
McCrae Olson	23	Pizza delivery boy	Oak Grove, Minnesota	1	Evicted; Day 84
Judd Daugherty	26	Property appraiser	Etowah, Tennessee	63	Evicted; Day 82
Judd Daugherty	26	Property appraiser	Etowah, Tennessee	1	Evicted; Day 49
Elissa Slater	27	Nutritionist	Kannapolis, North Carolina	1	Evicted; Day 77
Amanda Zuckerman	28	Real estate broker	Boynton Beach, Florida	1	Evicted; Day 77
Aaryn Gries	22	College student	San Marcos, Texas	1	Evicted; Day 70
Helen Kim	37	Political consultant	Chicago, Illinois	1	Evicted; Day 63
Jessie Kowalski	25	Unemployed	San Antonio, Texas	1	Evicted; Day 56
Candice Stewart	29	Pediatric speech therapist	Houston, Texas	1	Evicted; Day 49
Howard Overby	29	Youth counselor	Hattiesburg, Mississippi	1	Evicted; Day 42
Kaitlin Barnaby	23	Bartender	Minneapolis, Minnesota	1	Evicted; Day 35
Jeremy McGuire	23	Boat shop associate	Katy, Texas	1	Evicted; Day 28
Nick Uhas	28	Entrepreneur	New York, New York	1	Evicted; Day 21
David Girton	25	Lifeguard	San Diego, California	1	Evicted; Day 13

=== Future appearances ===
Nick Uhas appeared on season 12 of America's Got Talent. He advanced past the initial audition stage, but was ultimately eliminated before the live shows. In 2019, Uhas became the host of the Netflix reality series Blown Away. Elissa Slater competed on The Amazing Race 31 alongside her sister (and former Big Brother winner) Rachel Reilly.

== Summary ==
On Day 1, the original sixteen HouseGuests entered the house. Shortly after introductions, Howard, Jeremy, and Spencer quickly formed the first alliance of the season. Jeremy also formed an alliance with David and Jessie minutes later. The HouseGuests were later called to the living room, and learned that there would be a total of three nominations each week, though it was confirmed that the Head of Household would only nominate two of these nominees for eviction. Following this news, HouseGuests competed in the "Popsicle Factory" Head of Household competition. For this competition, the HouseGuests hung onto a fake Popsicle suspended in the air while being sprayed with colored water; the last HouseGuest remaining would be the first Head of Household. McCrae was the winner. Jeremy accepted a "temptation" to leave the Head of Household competition, winning a "Never-Not pass" that guarantees he will never be a "Have-Not" while in the game. Nick, the last HouseGuest remaining in the competition with McCrae, made a deal with McCrae for safety in exchange for dropping out of the Head of Household competition; McCrae agreed to the deal. Returning inside, the HouseGuests learned of the M.V.P. twist, in which, each week, the viewers would vote to give one HouseGuest a special power of selecting the third nominee. The winner of this power could choose to share it with their fellow HouseGuests or leave it a secret.

Following these events, Howard, Jeremy, McCrae, Nick, and Spencer formed the "Moving Company" alliance. HouseGuests later split into three teams to compete in the "Cooler and the Gang" Have-Not competition. For this competition, HouseGuests were required to swim across the backyard and grab cans in an attempt to stack them in the shape of a pyramid; while a HouseGuest was doing this, their teammates were required to hold the cans up on a stand, and were required to start over if their pyramid fell. The team of Andy, Elissa, Helen, Howard, and Judd were the Have-Nots for the week. On Day 5, McCrae nominated Candice and Jessie for eviction, feeling as though they were the least liked people in the house. Despite this, McCrae and his alliance hoped to backdoor Elissa, fearing her due to her relation to Rachel Reilly. Elissa later became the first "Big Brother M.V.P." of the season. On Day 7, Elissa nominated David for eviction. When picking players for the Power of Veto competition, Elissa and Howard were selected to compete. That night, HouseGuests competed in the "Big Brother Baking Competition" Power of Veto competition. For this competition, HouseGuests were required to crawl through a pool of honey to get to various blueberries. HouseGuests had to pop the blueberries to find the letters inside, and then attempted to spell the biggest word with the letters they found; the HouseGuest with the longest, correctly spelled word would win the Power of Veto. McCrae was the winner of the Power of Veto. On Day 9, McCrae used the Power of Veto to remove Candice from the block, and chose to nominate Elissa in her place. Despite this, a plan was set in motion by Amanda, McCrae, Andy, Judd, Spencer, Helen, Nick, and Howard to keep Elissa in the game and evict David. On Day 13, David became the first HouseGuest to be evicted from the house when he received a total of seven eviction votes (7-5-0).

Following David's eviction, HouseGuests competed in the "Big Brother BBQ" Head of Household competition. For this competition, HouseGuests competed as partners to transfer barbecue sauce from one side of the backyard to the other in an attempt to fill up a bowl and retrieve a ball inside; the first duo to retrieve their ball would be the winners, and would decide which of the pair would be the Head of Household. Aaryn and Jeremy were the winning couple, choosing Aaryn as the new Head of Household. She immediately had to choose four HouseGuests to be the Have-Nots for the week: Andy, Candice, Elissa, and Helen. On Day 15, Aaryn nominated Elissa and Helen for eviction, with Elissa being her main target. Elissa later learned that she had been selected to be the "M.V.P." for the second week in a row. On Day 16, Elissa nominated Jeremy for eviction. When picking players for the Power of Veto competition, Amanda and Nick were selected to compete; GinaMarie was selected to host. That night, HouseGuests competed in the "In the Balance" Power of Veto competition. Jeremy was the winner of the Power of Veto. On Day 18, Jeremy used the Power of Veto on himself, with Elissa nominating Nick in his place. Following this, Amanda and Helen campaigned to save Elissa, opting rather to evict Nick. McCrae, upset with the Moving Company alliance for attempting to turn him against Amanda, later agreed to keep Elissa in the house. On Day 21, the HouseGuests evicted Nick by a vote of 7–4–0.

Following Nick's eviction, HouseGuests competed in the "Overnight Delivery" Head of Household competition. For this competition, Julie Chen asked the HouseGuests true or false questions about "deliveries" that occurred in the backyard the previous night; when a HouseGuest answered incorrectly, they were eliminated from the competition, while the last HouseGuest remaining was the winner. Helen was the winner. Nick's eviction led to the end of the Moving Company alliance, and the four remaining members gradually informed the other HouseGuests of their Moving Company alliance. This, along with Nick's surprise eviction, led to numerous arguments in the house. On Day 22, HouseGuests competed in the "Scary Dairy" Have-Not competition. For this competition, HouseGuests threw buckets of sour milk to their teammates in an attempt to fill up a milk jug in the fastest time; the first two teams to complete the challenge would earn food for the week, while the losing team were the Have-Nots. Amanda, Jessie, Judd, and McCrae became the Have-Nots for the week. Helen later decided she wanted to see Jeremy be evicted, and decided that she should backdoor him. That night, she chose to nominate Aaryn and Kaitlin for eviction. Elissa learned later that night that she had been named "M.V.P." for the third week in a row. On Day 23, Elissa nominated Spencer for eviction. When picking players for the Power of Veto competition, GinaMarie and Candice were selected to compete; Judd was selected to host. That night, HouseGuests competed in the "Keeping Up with the Joneses" Power of Veto competition. For this competition, HouseGuests were required to jump on a trampoline to see an "art gallery" on the other side of a wall. They were then required to re-create the gallery on their own side of the wall, with the HouseGuest who finished in the quickest time winning the Power of Veto. Kaitlin won the Power of Veto. On Day 25, Kaitlin used the Power of Veto to remove herself from the block, with Jeremy being nominated in her place. Jeremy and Kaitlin attempted to turn the house against Aaryn, though this plan failed. On Day 28, Jeremy became the third HouseGuest to be evicted from the house when he received a total of nine eviction votes (9–1–0).

Following Jeremy's eviction, the HouseGuests competed in the "Big Brother Royalty" Head of Household competition. For this competition, HouseGuests were asked to determine which HouseGuest best fit a description based on how the viewers had voted in an online poll. A HouseGuest was eliminated for an incorrect answer, with the last HouseGuest remaining becoming the winner. Judd was the winner. In a twist this week, the viewers became the M.V.P. for the week and voted for the third nominee; the HouseGuests were not informed of this twist. On Day 29, HouseGuests competed in the "Funky Froyo" Have-Not competition. For this competition, HouseGuests were weighed before the start of the competition, and were then required to eat as much frozen yogurt as possible. The team that had gained the least amount of weight would become the Have-Nots for the week. The team of Andy, Candice, Jessie, and Spencer became the Have-Nots for the week. Much like the previous week, Amanda continued to campaign for Howard to be nominated and evicted, though Judd feared a girls alliance was in the house and opted to keep Howard safe. That same night, Judd nominated Aaryn and Kaitlin for eviction. Following this, GinaMarie, Howard, Judd, Kaitlin, and Spencer formed a new alliance in an attempt to go against Amanda, Elissa, Helen, and McCrae, who they felt were running the house. On Day 30, it was revealed that Elissa had been nominated for eviction by the viewers. When picking players for the Power of Veto competition, Helen and McCrae were selected to compete for the Power of Veto; Andy was selected to host. That same day, HouseGuests competed in the "Big Brother Election" Power of Veto competition. For this competition, HouseGuests dug through mud to find envelopes filled with "votes", and votes that were higher in value required HouseGuests to take punishments in exchange for points. The HouseGuest with the most points would be the winner. Elissa was the winner of the Power of Veto, while McCrae won a $5,000 prize. Helen, as a punishment, was required to be in bed early each night, while Judd had twenty-four hours in solitary confinement while being woken up by an alarm clock every nine minutes. Elissa, as part of another punishment, gave up the right to participate in the following Power of Veto competition. On Day 32, Elissa used the Power of Veto to remove herself from the block, with GinaMarie being nominated in her place. Though a plan was made to evict Kaitlin from the house, Elissa later informed Kaitlin of this and attempted to turn the house against Aaryn. Her attempts backfired, however, and led to a huge confrontation between Elissa and several other HouseGuests who soon lost their trust in her. On Day 35, Kaitlin became the fourth HouseGuest to be evicted from the house when she received nine eviction votes (9–0–0).

Following Kaitlin's eviction, HouseGuests competed in the "Roulette Me Win" Head of Household competition. For this competition, HouseGuests took turns rolling a ball down a slanted strip where it would land on a spinning Roulette wheel; the HouseGuest whose ball landed in the highest number would be the new Head of Household. Aaryn was the winner, making her the first HouseGuest this season to win Head of Household twice. Following her win, Amanda, Helen, and McCrae attempted to convince Aaryn to nominate Howard and Spencer for eviction due to a deal the four of them had made the previous week. Aaryn, Amanda, Andy, GinaMarie, Helen, Jessie, Judd, and McCrae formed an alliance to ensure the eviction of one of the two men. On Day 36, HouseGuests competed in the "Unexpectedly Unforgettable" Have-Not competition. Poppy Montgomery hosted the competition, in which HouseGuests had to place evidence on a desk only to have to put it back in the same position minutes later. The last team to correctly put their evidence in the original spot would be the Have-Nots for the week. The team of Amanda, Candice, GinaMarie, and Judd became the Have-Nots for the week. That same night, Aaryn nominated Howard and Spencer for eviction, with Howard being the target for the majority of the HouseGuests. On Day 37, it was revealed that the viewers had chosen to nominate Amanda for eviction. When picking players for the Power of Veto competition, Jessie and Candice were selected to compete for the Power of Veto; Helen was selected to host. That night, HouseGuests competed in the "Back In Time" Power of Veto competition. For this competition, HouseGuests had to solve a puzzle to form a dinosaur egg, with the first person to complete their puzzle winning the Power of Veto. Spencer won the Power of Veto. On Day 39, Spencer used the Power of Veto to remove himself from the block, with Candice being nominated in his place in an attempt to ensure Howard's eviction. Jessie and Candice, believing that Amanda and McCrae were in control of the game, attempted to get the votes to evict Amanda from the house, though this plan failed. As a result, Candice and Jessie became outcasts in the house, and became the targets for several HouseGuests. On Day 42, Howard became the fifth HouseGuest to be evicted from the house when he received a total of seven eviction votes (7–1–0).

Following Howard's eviction, HouseGuests competed in the "Bull in a China Shop" Head of Household competition. For this competition, HouseGuests had to walk on a rolling tube while holding on to a bull replica hanging on a rope; when a HouseGuest fell, their bull replica would crash into a china cabinet full of glass. The last HouseGuest remaining on the tube would be the winner. GinaMarie was the winner. Candice won a $5,000 prize, while Helen won a barbecue and invited Aaryn and Elissa to join her. Spencer received the punishment of having to speak using a bullhorn until after the nomination ceremony. GinaMarie and her allies decided to target Candice and Jessie for eviction, hoping to see Candice be evicted from the house. On Day 43, GinaMarie chose to nominate Candice and Jessie for eviction. On Day 44, it was revealed that Amanda had been selected as the third nominee for the second week in a row. When picking players for the Power of Veto competition, Judd and Spencer were selected to compete for the Power of Veto; Aaryn was selected to host. That same day, HouseGuests competed in the "Frog Darts" Power of Veto competition. For this competition, HouseGuests tossed stuffed frogs across a pond onto a set of lily pads; each individual pad was worth a certain number of points, and the HouseGuest with the lowest score each round was eliminated. The HouseGuest eliminated from each round would select a prize, though this could be stolen by a HouseGuest eliminated in a future round. Jessie was the winner of the Power of Veto. During the competition, GinaMarie received the punishment of wearing a dog cone for twenty-four hours, Amanda had to get various rounds of spray tan done, and Candice had to wear a "Clownitard" for a week. Judd was the winner of the competition, but chose to take a $5,000 prize leaving Jessie with the Power of Veto. On Day 46, Jessie chose to use the Power of Veto to remove herself from the block, with Spencer being nominated in her place. On Day 49, the HouseGuests learned that it would be a Double Eviction, and that the M.V.P. twist had officially ended. They also learned that this season would feature nine Jury members, rather than seven. Candice then became the sixth HouseGuest to be evicted when she received seven eviction votes (7–0–0). She became the first member of the Jury of Nine. The HouseGuests then competed in the "Summer School" Head of Household competition. For this competition, HouseGuests had to determine whether there was less or more of an item than what Julie Chen told them. Aaryn was the winner. Following this, Aaryn chose to nominate Jessie and Spencer for eviction, with the plan of evicting Jessie. When picking players for the Power of Veto competition, Amanda, Andy, and Judd were selected to compete. The HouseGuests then competed in the "Nailed It" Power of Veto competition. For this competition, HouseGuests had to attempt to fit a set of nails into the correctly sized slots, with the HouseGuest to finish first winning the Power of Veto. Aaryn was the winner of the Power of Veto. Following this, a plan was set in motion to evict Judd from the house, resulting in Aaryn using the Power of Veto to remove Jessie from the block, with Judd being nominated in her place. Minutes later, Judd became the seventh HouseGuest to be evicted from the house when he received seven eviction votes. He became the second member of the jury.

Following Candice and Judd's eviction, the remaining nine HouseGuests competed in the "Cherry on Top" Head of Household competition. For this competition, HouseGuests were put into a tournament-style bracket. The object was to roll a ball down a curved banana and have it land on top of the ice cream sundae. The first HouseGuest to get the ball on the sundae, moved on to the next round. Andy was the winner. Andy was also tasked with picking four HouseGuests as Have-Nots for the week and chose Aaryn, Elissa, GinaMarie, and Helen. On Day 50, Jessie and Spencer were nominated for eviction. Elissa, Amanda, and Helen were picked to play in the veto competition, while McCrae was selected to host. That same day, HouseGuests competed in the "BBB Movie" Power of Veto competition. For this competition, HouseGuests were given a few minutes to study three movie sets. They were then asked questions about how many of a certain item there were in a set. If the HouseGuest was confident in their answer, they would "stay" for an attempt at winning a movie ticket. The housemate that was closest to the correct answer would receive a movie ticket, while the others were eliminated. If they were not confident they would "fold" and stay in the competition regardless of their answer. The first HouseGuest to obtain three movie tickets would be the winner. Andy was the winner. On Day 53, Andy chose not to use the Power of Veto. On Day 56, in a unanimous vote of 6–0, Jessie was evicted and became the third jury member.

Following Jessie's eviction, Aaryn won her fourth Head of Household of the season in the "Way Off Broadway" HoH competition. Later that day, Julie Chen revealed to the audience that one of the four jury members would be coming back on the next weeks eviction night. On Day 57, the HouseGuests competed in the Have-Not competition, "The Black Box". In this competition, the HouseGuests had to enter a big, pitch-black box with many crawl spaces and gags, find the key, and exit the black box and hit a button to stop the timer. Amanda, Elissa, GinaMarie, and Helen were the Have-Nots for the week. Aaryn then chose to nominate Elissa and Helen, with Helen being her target. Andy, GinaMarie, and Spencer were selected to play in the Veto competition. On Day 58, Elissa went on to win her second Veto competition of the season. Elissa used the Veto to remove her nomination, and Aaryn nominated Spencer in her stead. On Day 63, Helen was evicted by a vote of 4–1, with Elissa being the only one to vote for Spencer.

Shortly after Helen's eviction, the remaining HouseGuests and first four jurors competed in the "Off the Wall" competition, which functioned as both the HoH and re-entry competition. The HouseGuests and jurors were to stand on platforms and catch balls thrown at them without falling off. The first player overall to catch 10 balls or last to remain standing would be the new HoH, and the first juror to do so would return to the game. Judd was the last juror left standing and returned to the game as a HouseGuest, and Elissa was the first to catch 10 balls and became Head of Household. On Day 64, Elissa nominated Aaryn and McCrae for eviction. On Day 65, Amanda, GinaMarie, and Judd were selected to play in the Veto competition. Amanda won the Veto competition, her first individual competition win of the season. On Day 67, Amanda used the Power of Veto to save McCrae, causing Elissa to name Andy the replacement nominee. On Day 70, Aaryn was evicted by a vote of 5–0.

Following Aaryn's eviction, the remaining HouseGuests began the "Big Hopportunity" competition. The HouseGuests were to hop to a wall made from chicken wire. There, each HouseGuest navigated their egg them through a maze formed by the letters "HoH" to a hole at the far side. They then had to hop back down and drop the egg in their basket. GinaMarie was the first HouseGuest with a dozen eggs and won the HoH. On the live show, Julie Chen also announced that the HouseGuests will compete in a special competition, and a live double eviction during Week 10. On Day 71, GinaMarie chose to nominate Amanda and McCrae for eviction. On Day 72, Spencer, Andy, and Elissa were selected to play in the Veto competition. McCrae won the Veto competition. On Day 74, McCrae used the Veto on himself and Spencer was once again named the replacement nominee. On Day 77, Amanda was evicted in a 3–2 vote after GinaMarie was forced to break the tie. Because this was also a double eviction week, the remaining HouseGuests went straight into the Head of Household competition, which McCrae won. McCrae (unaware that Andy was the one who had double crossed him and Amanda) nominated Elissa and GinaMarie shortly after. When Judd won the Power of Veto, he decided not to use it and Elissa was evicted in a unanimous 3–0 vote.

Following Amanda and Elissa's eviction, the HouseGuests competed in the following Head of Household competition, which Spencer won. He nominated GinaMarie and McCrae. On Day 79, McCrae won the Power of Veto, his third Veto win of the season. On Day 81, McCrae used the Veto on himself and Spencer chose to name Judd as the replacement nominee. On Day 82, Judd was evicted from the house for a second time in a 2–0 vote.

Following Judd's second eviction, Andy won his second HoH of the season in the "Before or After" HoH competition. On Day 83, he nominated McCrae and Spencer for eviction. That same day, the HouseGuests competed in the final Veto competition of the season, titled "Web of (F)Lies". Andy won the Power of Veto. On Day 84, Andy decided not to use the Power of Veto. Immediately following the Veto ceremony, GinaMarie, with the sole vote to evict, choose to evict McCrae from the game.

Following McCrae's eviction, the final three participated in the first part of the final HoH competition, "The Great E-skate", with GinaMarie being the victor. On Day 86, Spencer and Andy competed in part two of the final HoH competition, "Crab Grab", which Andy won. During the finale, Andy and GinaMarie faced off in the final part of the competition, "Jury Statements". Andy won the competition and, as final HoH, cast the sole vote to evict Spencer from the house. After asking questions to the final two, the nine-person jury voted to crown the season's winner. Andy won with a 7–2 vote, and Elissa won $25,000 as America's Favorite HouseGuest, with Judd and Howard gaining the next-highest number of votes.

== Episodes ==
No. overall	No. in season	Title	Original release date
470	1	"Episode 1"	June 26, 2013
471	2	"Episode 2"	June 30, 2013
472	3	"Episode 3"	July 2, 2013
473	4	"Episode 4"	July 3, 2013
474	5	"Episode 5"	July 7, 2013
475	6	"Episode 6"	July 10, 2013
476	7	"Episode 7"	July 11, 2013
477	8	"Episode 8"	July 14, 2013
478	9	"Episode 9"	July 17, 2013
479	10	"Episode 10"	July 18, 2013
480	11	"Episode 11"	July 21, 2013
481	12	"Episode 12"	July 24, 2013
482	13	"Episode 13"	July 25, 2013
483	14	"Episode 14"	July 28, 2013
484	15	"Episode 15"	July 31, 2013
485	16	"Episode 16"	August 1, 2013
486	17	"Episode 17"	August 4, 2013
487	18	"Episode 18"	August 7, 2013
488	19	"Episode 19"	August 8, 2013
489	20	"Episode 20"	August 11, 2013
490	21	"Episode 21"	August 14, 2013
491	22	"Episode 22"	August 15, 2013
492	23	"Episode 23"	August 18, 2013
493	24	"Episode 24"	August 21, 2013
494	25	"Episode 25"	August 22, 2013
495	26	"Episode 26"	August 25, 2013
496	27	"Episode 27"	August 28, 2013
497	28	"Episode 28"	August 29, 2013
498	29	"Episode 29"	September 1, 2013
499	30	"Episode 30"	September 4, 2013
500	31	"Episode 31"	September 5, 2013
501	32	"Episode 32"	September 8, 2013
502	33	"Episode 33"	September 11, 2013
503	34	"Episode 34"	September 12, 2013
504	35	"Episode 35"	September 15, 2013
505	36	"Episode 36"	September 18, 2013

== Voting history ==
Color key:

Winner
Runner-up
Head of Household
Nominated for eviction
Evicted
Re-entered the game

Voting history (season 15)
	Week 1	Week 2	Week 3	Week 4	Week 5	Week 6		Week 7	Week 8	Week 9	Week 10		Week 11		Week 12	
	Week 1	Week 2	Week 3	Week 4	Week 5	Day 43	Day 49 (Note: This week was a double eviction week. Following the first eviction, the remaining HouseGuests played a week's worth of games, including Head of Household and veto competitions, and nomination, veto and eviction ceremonies, during the live show, culminating in a second eviction for the week.)	Week 7	Week 8	Week 9	Day 70	Day 77	Day 78	Day 84	Day 90	Finale
Head of Household	McCrae	Aaryn	Helen	Judd	Aaryn	GinaMarie	Aaryn	Andy	Aaryn	Elissa	GinaMarie	McCrae	Spencer	Andy	Andy	(None)
M.V.P.	Elissa	Elissa	Elissa	America (Note: During weeks 4-6, unbeknownst to the HouseGuests, the audience was given the M.V.P. power. The HouseGuest with the most audience votes, other than the Head of Household and their two nominees, was named the third nominee. If the veto were used to replace this nominee, the eligible HouseGuest with the next highest number of votes from the audience would become the replacement nominee.)			(None)								(None)	(None)
Nominations (initial)	Candice; David (Note: This player was secretly nominated for eviction by the M.V.P.); Jessie	Elissa; Helen; Jeremy	Aaryn; Kaitlin; Spencer	Aaryn; Elissa; Kaitlin	Amanda; Howard; Spencer	Amanda; Candice; Jessie	Jessie; Spencer	Jessie; Spencer	Elissa; Helen	Aaryn; McCrae	Amanda; McCrae	Elissa; GinaMarie	GinaMarie; McCrae	McCrae; Spencer	(None)	(None)
Veto winner	McCrae	Jeremy	Kaitlin	Elissa	Spencer	Jessie	Aaryn	Andy	Elissa	Amanda	McCrae	Judd	McCrae	Andy	(None)	(None)
Nominations (final)	David; Elissa; Jessie	Elissa; Helen; Nick	Aaryn; Jeremy; Spencer	Aaryn; GinaMarie; Kaitlin	Amanda; Candice; Howard	Amanda; Candice; Spencer	Judd; Spencer	Jessie; Spencer	Helen; Spencer	Aaryn; Andy	Amanda; Spencer	Elissa; GinaMarie	GinaMarie; Judd	McCrae; Spencer	GinaMarie; Spencer	(None)
Andy	David	Nick	Jeremy	Kaitlin	Howard	Candice	Judd	Head of Household	Helen	Nominated	Amanda	Elissa	Judd	Head of Household	Spencer (Note: As Head of Household, Andy chose to evict Spencer.)	Winner
GinaMarie	Elissa	Elissa	Jeremy	Nominated	Howard	Head of Household	Judd	Jessie	Helen	Aaryn	Amanda (Note: As the vote was tied, the Head of Household cast the tie-breaker vote.)	Nominated	Nominated	McCrae	Nominated	Runner-up
Spencer	David	Nick	Nominated	Kaitlin	Candice	Nominated	Nominated	Nominated	Nominated	Aaryn	Nominated	Elissa	Head of Household	Nominated	Evicted (Day 90)	Andy
McCrae	Head of Household	Nick	Jeremy	Kaitlin	Howard	Candice	Judd	Jessie	Helen	Aaryn	Spencer	Head of Household	Judd	Nominated	Evicted (Day 84)	Andy
Judd	David	Nick	Jeremy	Head of Household	Howard	Candice	Nominated	Evicted (Day 49)		Aaryn	Amanda	Elissa	Nominated	Re-evicted (Day 82)		GinaMarie
Elissa	Nominated	Nominated	Jeremy	Kaitlin	Howard	Candice	Judd	Jessie	Spencer	Head of Household	Spencer	Nominated	Evicted (Day 77)			Andy
Amanda	David	Nick	Jeremy	Kaitlin	Nominated	Nominated	Judd	Jessie	Helen	Aaryn	Nominated	Evicted (Day 77)				Andy
Aaryn	Elissa	Head of Household	Nominated	Nominated	Head of Household	Candice	Head of Household	Jessie	Head of Household	Nominated	Evicted (Day 70)					GinaMarie
Helen	David	Nominated	Head of Household	Kaitlin	Howard	Candice	Judd	Jessie	Nominated	Evicted (Day 63)						Andy
Jessie	Nominated	Nick	Jeremy	Kaitlin	Howard	Candice	Judd	Nominated	Evicted (Day 56)							Andy
Candice	Elissa	Nick	Jeremy	Kaitlin	Nominated	Nominated	Evicted (Day 49)									Andy
Howard	David	Elissa	Jeremy	Kaitlin	Nominated	Evicted (Day 42)										
Kaitlin	Elissa	Elissa	Spencer	Nominated	Evicted (Day 35)											
Jeremy	Elissa	Elissa	Nominated	Evicted (Day 28)												
Nick	David	Nominated	Evicted (Day 21)													
David	Nominated	Evicted (Day 13)														
Evicted	David; 7 of 12 votes to evict	Nick; 7 of 11 votes to evict	Jeremy; 9 of 10 votes to evict	Kaitlin; 9 of 9 votes to evict	Howard; 7 of 8 votes to evict	Candice; 7 of 7 votes to evict	Judd; 7 of 7 votes to evict	Jessie; 6 of 6 votes to evict	Helen; 4 of 5 votes to evict	Judd; Won re-entry into game (Note: Candice, Judd, Jessie, and Helen competed for a chance to re-enter the game. Judd won the competition and re-entered the house.)	Amanda; 3 of 5 votes to evict	Elissa; 3 of 3 votes to evict	Judd; 2 of 2 votes to evict	McCrae; GinaMarie's choice to evict	Spencer; Andy's choice to evict	Andy; 7 votes to win
Evicted	David; 7 of 12 votes to evict	Nick; 7 of 11 votes to evict	Jeremy; 9 of 10 votes to evict	Kaitlin; 9 of 9 votes to evict	Howard; 7 of 8 votes to evict	Candice; 7 of 7 votes to evict	Judd; 7 of 7 votes to evict	Jessie; 6 of 6 votes to evict	Helen; 4 of 5 votes to evict	Aaryn; 5 of 5 votes to evict	Amanda; 3 of 5 votes to evict	Elissa; 3 of 3 votes to evict	Judd; 2 of 2 votes to evict	McCrae; GinaMarie's choice to evict	Spencer; Andy's choice to evict	GinaMarie; 2 votes to win

== Production ==
Big Brother 15 was officially announced on September 19, 2012 shortly before the finale of the previous season. It was confirmed that Executive Producer Allison Grodner would return to the series, as would Rich Meehan for Fly on the Wall Entertainment. It was later announced that Big Brother 15 would last for a total of 100 days, making it the longest edition of the series to date. Casting for the season began shortly afterwards, with open casting calls being held in states such as Florida, California, West Virginia, and Maine, among others. Online applications were also available, with the online deadline being May 11, 2013. Semi-finalists for the casting process were informed in May and June 2013. Robyn Kass of Kassting Inc. was responsible for casting as with various previous seasons. This season was the first to feature a completely new cast since the 12th season in 2010. Despite statements made earlier by host Julie Chen stating that there would be more HouseGuests than ever before, it was later confirmed that the season would feature a total of 16 HouseGuests. The 16 HouseGuests were revealed on June 20, 2013. It was later revealed that HouseGuest Elissa Slater is the sister of Big Brother 13 winner Rachel Reilly.

The season continued to feature a wide variety of fan interactivity, with Rob Gelick, the Senior Vice President and General Manager of Digital Platforms for CBS Interactive Entertainment, stating "We're building on Big Brother's major strides in interactivity – including primetime reality TV's first live Twitter vote – by bringing the show's die-hard fans even more opportunities to impact components of the show and interact with this season's HouseGuests ... Fans will have the most immersive, 360-degree Big Brother experience ever, across every possible screen, including social media integrations." On April 4, 2013, it was announced that the live feeds would be hosted by the official CBS website. This made it the first time that SuperPass had not hosted the live feeds since the first season. It was later confirmed that the spin-off series Big Brother: After Dark would begin airing on TVGN, the first time since the show's debut. Big Brother: After Dark is slated to premiere the same night as the main series. Changes to the weekly airing schedule of the series were also made, though it still remained on air for three nights a week. The twist for the season was revealed by CBS on June 19, 2013, when it was confirmed that three HouseGuests would be nominated per week. It was also revealed that fans would vote each week for one HouseGuest to be the M.V.P. of the week, earning a special power. On this twist, Grodner stated "The Big Brother MVP will force the HouseGuests to rethink their strategies. With America rewarding good game play, it doesn't pay to be a floater this summer." The HouseGuests moved into the house on June 21, 2013.

=== House ===
On June 18, 2013, fifteen pictures of the new house including a video tour were released. The house's theme has been called "mid-century modern" by Julie Chen. Scott Storey, the show's production designer, has hinted that the house's design references several 1960s' icons, as well as films and shows set in the era. Included are nods to Charles and Ray Eames, Mary Blair, the 1964 World's Fair, Pan-Am, Catch Me If You Can, and Mad Men. The line is filled with arrows, this some leading from the kitchen to the bathroom and some located directly across from the front door. A large globe hangs from the wall in the kitchen, while the counters in the kitchen are round instead of box shaped. The bathroom features mostly wood, and also features red rugs and pillows. Images of Los Angeles International Airport can be found in the hallway leading to the Head of Household bedroom. One of the bedrooms is architecture oriented, and featured walls decorated with blueprints and sketches. The third bedroom is filled with various colors on the walls in an abstract form. The backyard features a round seating area, a hammock, a pool table and an immersion pool.

== Reception ==
=== Ratings ===
The series premiered on June 26, 2013, to a 2.2 rating with adults 18–49, according to Nielsen overnight numbers. This made it the second lowest rated season premiere for the series to date. The following three episodes continued to see a decline in ratings, with the July 3 episode earning 5.42 million viewers, the season low thus far. The decline in ratings, mainly when compared to previous seasons, was noted as being partly due to the racism controversy outside of the house. The following episode, however, saw an audience of 6.24 million viewers, only the second episode this season to surpass the six million viewers mark. Though ratings did decline for the following episode, the first Thursday eviction of the season had an increase in ratings, becoming the third episode to reach six million viewers. The following four episodes all continued to increase in ratings, with both the July 18 and 21 episodes achieving a higher number of viewers than the season premiere. Though the following episode saw a drop in ratings, it continued to surpass the six million viewers mark. The July 25 episode saw an audience of 6.90 million viewers, making it the second most watched episode of the season at that point. It was noted that the increase in ratings came after the decision was made to air the racist and homophobic comments made by numerous HouseGuests.

=== Viewing figures ===
Key
†	Season high for that night of the week

#	Air Date	United States					Source
#	Air Date	Households (rating/share)	18–49 (rating/share)	Viewers (millions)	Rank (timeslot)	Rank (night)	Source
1	Wednesday, June 26	3.9/7	2.2/8	6.51	1	1	
2	Sunday, June 30	3.5/6	1.9/6	5.81	1	1	
3	Tuesday, July 2	3.6/6	1.9/6	5.64	2	3	
4	Wednesday, July 3		1.7/7	5.42	1	1	
5	Sunday, July 7	3.8/7	2.1/7	6.24	1	1	
6	Wednesday, July 10	3.7/7	2.0/7	5.85	2	3	
7	Thursday, July 11	4.0/7	2.1/7	6.18	1	1	
8^{1}	Sunday, July 14		2.1/3	6.27	1	1	
9	Wednesday, July 17	3.9/7	2.2/8	6.44	1	2 (Tie)	
10	Thursday, July 18	4.2/7	2.4/7	6.70	1	1	
11	Sunday, July 21	4.1/7	2.5/8	6.91	1	1	
12	Wednesday, July 24		2.3/8	6.44	1	3	
13	Thursday, July 25	4.2/7	2.5/8	6.90	1	1	
14	Sunday, July 28	4.1/7	2.3/7	6.81	1	1	
15	Wednesday, July 31		2.1/7	6.25	2	3	
16	Thursday, August 1	4.4/7	2.5/8	7.12	1	1	
17	Sunday, August 4	4.1/7	2.3/7	6.79	2	2	
18	Wednesday, August 7		2.2/8	6.43	1	2	
19^{2}	Thursday, August 8		2.4/7	6.61	1	1	
20^{3}	Sunday, August 11		2.4/8	7.14	1	1	
21	Wednesday, August 14		2.0/7	6.17	1	3	
22	Thursday, August 15		2.2/7	6.33	1	1	
23	Sunday, August 18		2.1/6	6.48	1	1	
24	Wednesday, August 21		2.2/7	6.38	1	2	
25	Thursday, August 22		2.1/6	6.31	1	1	
26	Sunday, August 25		2.5/7	7.17	2	2	
27	Wednesday, August 28		2.1/7	6.36	1	3	
28^{4}	Thursday, August 29		1.8/5	5.05	1	1	
29	Sunday, September 1		1.8/7	6.00	1	1	
30	Wednesday, September 4		2.3/8	6.75	1	2	
31	Thursday, September 5		2.5/7	7.23 †	2	4	
32^{5}	Sunday, September 8		2.3/6	7.26 †	1	5	
33	Wednesday, September 11		2.3/7	6.83 †	1	2	
34	Thursday, September 12		2.2/6	6.49	1	1 (Tie)	
35^{5}	Sunday, September 15		2.3/6	6.93	1	5	
36^{6}	Wednesday, September 18		2.5/7	6.71	1	2 (Tie)	

- ^Note 1: Episode 8 was delayed by 20 minutes due to live golf coverage.
- ^Note 2: Episode 19 was delayed by up to an hour in some markets on the west coast due to live NFL preseason coverage.
- ^Note 3: Episode 20 was delayed by 8 minutes in the Eastern and Central time zones due to live golf coverage.
- ^Note 4: Episode 28 was delayed in some markets due to live NFL preseason coverage.
- ^Note 5: Episodes 32 and 35 were delayed by 51 minutes due to live NFL coverage.
- ^Note 6: Episode 36 was the season finale and aired at a special time of 9:30/8:30c for 90 minutes.

=== Critical response ===
Big Brother 15 became highly controversial after a variety of bigoted remarks were made by several of the HouseGuests, both on the aired episodes and on the live feeds. The main source of the controversy was centered on Aaryn Gries, who made numerous offensive remarks directed at people who were minorities. Other contestants also received notable criticism for their similarly ignorant comments, including GinaMarie Zimmerman, Spencer Clawson, and Amanda Zuckerman. These remarks were widely condemned as racist, homophobic, antisemitic, and misogynistic.

The behavior exhibited this season led to a very negative reaction from viewers, with over 27,000 people signing a petition asking for CBS to expel Aaryn from the Big Brother house before she was evicted on Day 70. About the controversy, CBS stated:

Big Brother is a reality show about watching a group of people who have no privacy 24/7 — and seeing every moment of their lives. At times, the houseguests reveal prejudices and other beliefs that we do not condone. We certainly find the statements made by several of the houseguests on the live Internet feed to be offensive. Any views or opinions expressed in personal commentary by a houseguest appearing on Big Brother, either on any live feed from the house or during the broadcast, are those of the individual(s) speaking and do not represent the views or opinions of CBS or the producers of the program.

A similarly worded disclaimer began appearing before the episodes shortly afterward. It was later speculated that the HouseGuests had been warned about these comments.

Several of the discriminatory remarks first started to air on the show during the July 7 episode. Following these revelations, it was reported that Aaryn had been dropped by her talent agency and lost her job as a magazine spokesmodel. GinaMarie was also fired from her job as a pageant coordinator and Spencer's employer later released a statement acknowledging his comments made on the live feeds.

Chen expressed her opinion on the topic on her CBS talk show The Talk. "It stung", said Chen. "I took it personally. The really sad part was it took me back to the '70s when I was growing up in Queens, when I was 7 being bullied and being called a chink ... the year is 2013! Then I felt ignorant. There are still people who feel that way? Yes, there is." She claimed that her Twitter account was "blowing up" with people demanding her response to the incident. Furthermore, Chen stated that the network and the show take this very seriously and they would not show this if it didn't affect the game play of the other contestants.

Leslie Moonves, the CEO and president of CBS at the time and husband of Julie Chen, spoke with reporters about the controversy during his network's Summer Press Tour.

Big Brother obviously is a social experiment, it always was. It was established as a social experiment and clearly that's what's happening this year. I find some of the behavior absolutely appalling personally. What you see there unfortunately is a reflection of how certain people feel in America. It's what our show is, I think we handled it properly. A lot of it makes us uncomfortable. I've watched every episode of the show, obviously [Julie Chen] would kill me if I didn't. So, I do know what's going on there we do discuss it quite a bit. I think we are handling it quite appropriately. We did not comment on some of the racial things being said until it started affecting what was going on in the household. There was a lot of chatter about it on the Internet and I think we've handled it the way we should have.
