= Academy of the Impossible =

Academy of the Impossible is a peer-to-peer learning and events organization in Toronto, Ontario, Canada. It was founded in 2011 by Jesse Hirsh and Emily Pohl-Weary. It spent its first two years at 231 Wallace Street in the Junction Triangle neighbourhood of Toronto, but since December 2013 has operated in multiple locations.

== Programs ==
The Academy offers a variety of workshops and salons, and hosts events. It features aikido and self-defense instruction, a literacy group called Parkdale Street Writers, an Internet-focused series called Hacking Reality and the business of journalism courses. Hirsh describes the Academy as a "classroom for the future" and an "open-source social enterprise."
