= Deborah Czeresko =

American glass artist

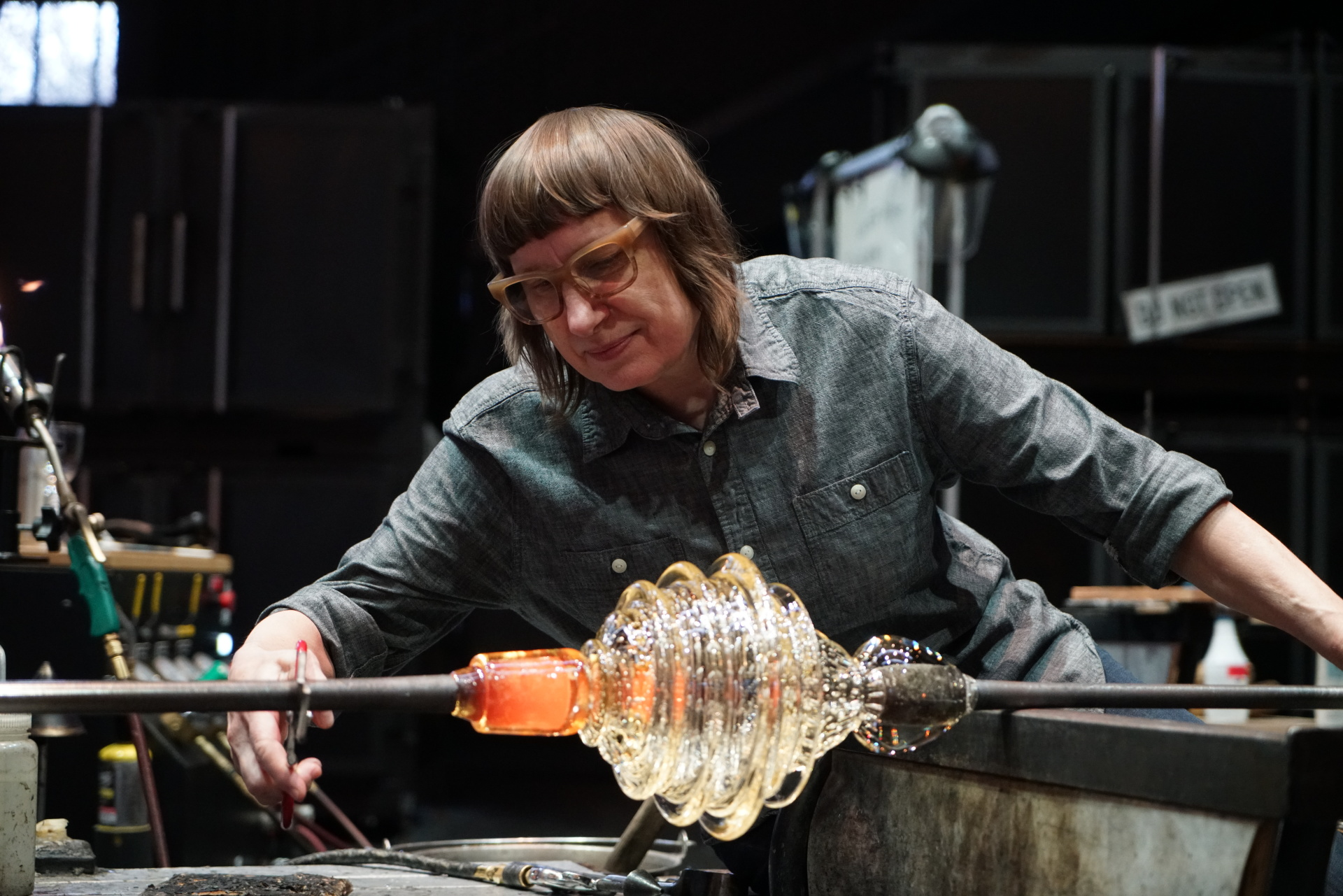
- Born: July 27, 1961 (age 65)
- Education: Rutgers University; Tulane University
- Known for: Studio glass blowing
- Website: deborahczeresko.com

Deborah Czeresko (born July 27, 1961) is an American glass blower known for winning the first season of the Netflix series, Blown Away.

== Education ==
In 1983, Czeresko graduated from Rutgers University and graduated from Tulane University in 1992.

== Career ==
Her works are in the permanent collection of the Museum of American Glass in Millville, New Jersey, Glasmuseet Ebeltoft, and the Frauenau Glass Museum. She served on the board of directors for UrbanGlass, a glassblowing studio based in Brooklyn, from 2008 to 2018.

In 2019, she won the first season of the Netflix series, Blown Away.

In 2019, her piece, "Meat Chandelier," was one of 100 chosen for The Corning Museum of Glass' exhibition, New Glass Now, a survey of contemporary glass from around the world. Her prize package from winning Blown Away included a residency at The Corning Museum of Glass.

== Artistry ==
Using Venetian-style glassmaking techniques, Czeresko's work showcases her personal experiences shaped by contemporary issues. Czeresko often uses her work as a glassmaker to highlight the issue of women's equality. She said in an interview, "So, I’ve long been interested in women occupying these spaces that involve physicality, where they’re perceived as not belonging. I wanted to make glass the great equalizer."

== Selected exhibitions ==
- 2006: Transparency, Corridor Gallery, Reykjavik, Iceland
- 2007: Art Now, Middlebury College Museum of Art, Middlebury, VT
- 2010: Armory Show, UrbanGlass, Armory Arts Week, Brooklyn, NY
- 2010: Shoefitti & Ibeam, Louisville Glassworks, Louisville, KY
- 2010: The Fabritory, Glasphemy by Macro Sea, Brooklyn, NY
- 2011: Shoefitti, Hudson Beach Glass, Philadelphia, PA
- 2013: Art of the Fellowship, Museum of American Glass, Millville, NJ
- 2015: CreativityAscertained, Museum of American Glass, Millville, NJ
- 2015: Post Mortem, UGent, Rommelaere Instituut, Ghent, Belgium
- 2018: How Shall We Dine, Rockland Center for the Arts, Rockland, NY
- 2018: StreetKraft, Habatat Gallery, Royal Oak, MI
- 2019: New Glass Now, The Corning Museum of Glass, Corning, NY
- 2019: COLLABORATIONS with QUEER VOICES curated by Matthew Day Perez + Kate Hush, Heller Gallery, New York, NY
- 2020: Venice and American Studio Glass, Le Stanze del Vetro, Venice, Italy
- 2021: Fire & Form: New Directions in Glass, Long Island Museum, Stony Brook, NY
- 2024: Sand, Ash, Heat: Glass, New Orleans Museum of Art, New Orleans, LA

== Permanent Collections ==
- Toledo Museum, Toledo, Ohio
- Corning Museum of Glass, Corning, New York
- New Orleans Museum of Art, New Orleans, Louisiana
- Museum of American Glass, Millville, New Jersey
- Glass Museum Ebeltoft, Ebeltoft, Denmark
- Frauenau Glasmuseum, Frauenau, West Germany

== Performances ==
- 2009-2019 World’s Largest Glass
- 2012 Performance as Medium, Armory arts Week, Brooklyn Glass, Brooklyn, New York
- 2011-2014 Worlds Largest, Chrysler Museum of Glass, Brooklyn, New York
- 2014 Glass Medea, Disembodied Voices at Brooklyn Glass, Brooklyn, New York
- 2015 Fabrication Collective, Urban Glass, Brooklyn, New York
- 2016 The…, Urban Glass, Brooklyn, New York
- 2017 Women Up!, Urban Glass, Brooklyn, New York
- 2019 Fall Fund Raiser, Urban Glass, Brooklyn, New York
