= Katherine Gray =

Canadian artist and professor (born 1965)

- Born: 1965 (age 60–61); Canada
- Education: Ontario College of Art; Rhode Island School of Design (M.F.A.)
- Known for: Glass artist

Katherine Gray (born 1965) is a Canadian glass artist and professor of art at California State University, San Bernardino. Her work includes vases, candelabras, and goblets, and some of her pieces are designed to fit inside each other.

== Early life and education ==
Gray was born in Canada in 1965. She received an undergraduate degree from the Ontario College of Art and her Master of Fine Arts from Rhode Island School of Design.

== Career ==
Her works are in the Corning Museum of Glass, the Museum of American Glass, and the Tacoma Museum of Glass. Her works have also been exhibited internationally at Glasmuseet Ebeltoft in Denmark and Galerie Handwerk in Munich, Germany. Gray has won several grants and awards, including the Award of Merit from the Bellevue Art Museum in Washington and the ARC Completion Grant from the Center for Cultural Innovation in Los Angeles, California. She created one of her most well-known pieces, Forest Glass, by collecting glass from thrift shops and stores, then assembling the glass into the shape of trees. Gray creates functional art, including chandeliers, as well as works that "defy functionality." She also makes use of transparency in her work.

Gray is an associate professor at California State University, San Bernardino and teaches workshops elsewhere. In addition to serving on the board of trustees for the Haystack Mountain School of Crafts (Deer Isle, Maine), Gray has contributed to Glass Magazine and Glass Gazette. Her solo show, "Katherine Gray: As Clear as the Experience," opened at the Craft and Folk Art Museum in Los Angeles in May 2018.

Gray appears as a judge on the Netflix show Blown Away.
