= William Morris (glass artist) =

American glass artist, born 1957

'Suspended Artifact', glass and iron work by William Morris, 1993, Metropolitan Museum of Art

William Morris (born 1957) is an American glass artist. After retiring in 2007 at the age of 49, he resides in both Washington and Hawaii.

== Early life and education ==
William Morris was born on July 25, 1957 in Carmel, California, United States. Morris grew up in Carmel, California. He was educated at California State University, Chico, California, and Central Washington University, Ellensburg, Washington.

== Career ==
William Morris was first introduced to glass at Pilchuck Glass School, Stanwood, Washington, where he was employed as a bus driver. Early in his career (late 1970s to early 1980s) he was head gaffer for Dale Chihuly. He began making his own work in the 1980s. He relied on the same core team of assistants throughout his career; Karen Willenbrink-Johnsen, Jon Ormbrek, and Randy Walker. Some of the other artists who have worked with his team throughout the years include Blaise Campbell, Ross Richmond, and Trumaine Mason. With the help of Pino Signoretto, an Italian glass maestro from Murano, Morris developed new techniques that used oxy/propane torches to spot heat specific sections of a piece allowing for the high level of detail that his work is known for. Morris and his team maintained the William Morris Studio, WA, throughout its duration.

Morris' work is an attempt to add to the archeological record of humankind. Instead of focusing on glass's natural beauty, he uses the medium's ability to transform into wood, bone, fiber, and sinew. He is inspired by ancient civilizations, such as Egyptian, Asian, Native American and Latin American. He also draws inspiration from the wilderness and the relationship between man and animal.

Morris achieved much success during his career and retired in 2007.

== Personal life ==
Later in life while working as a glass artist, he resided in Washington. During breaks from glass making, he spent time in Idaho's Bitterroot Mountains and Pioneer Mountains and Oregon's Wallowa Mountains and Elkhorn Mountains.

== Awards ==
- Artist as Hero Award, National Liberty Museum, Philadelphia, PA 2002
- Visionary Award, American Craft Museum, NY 2001
- Outstanding Achievement in Glass, UrbanGlass Third Annual Awards Dinner, New York, NY 1997
- Distinguished Alumni Award, California State University, Chico, California 1997
- Featured Artist, Chateau Ste. Michelle Winery, Artist Series 1997
- National Endowment for the Arts, individual artist grant 1994
