= Karol Wight =

American museum director

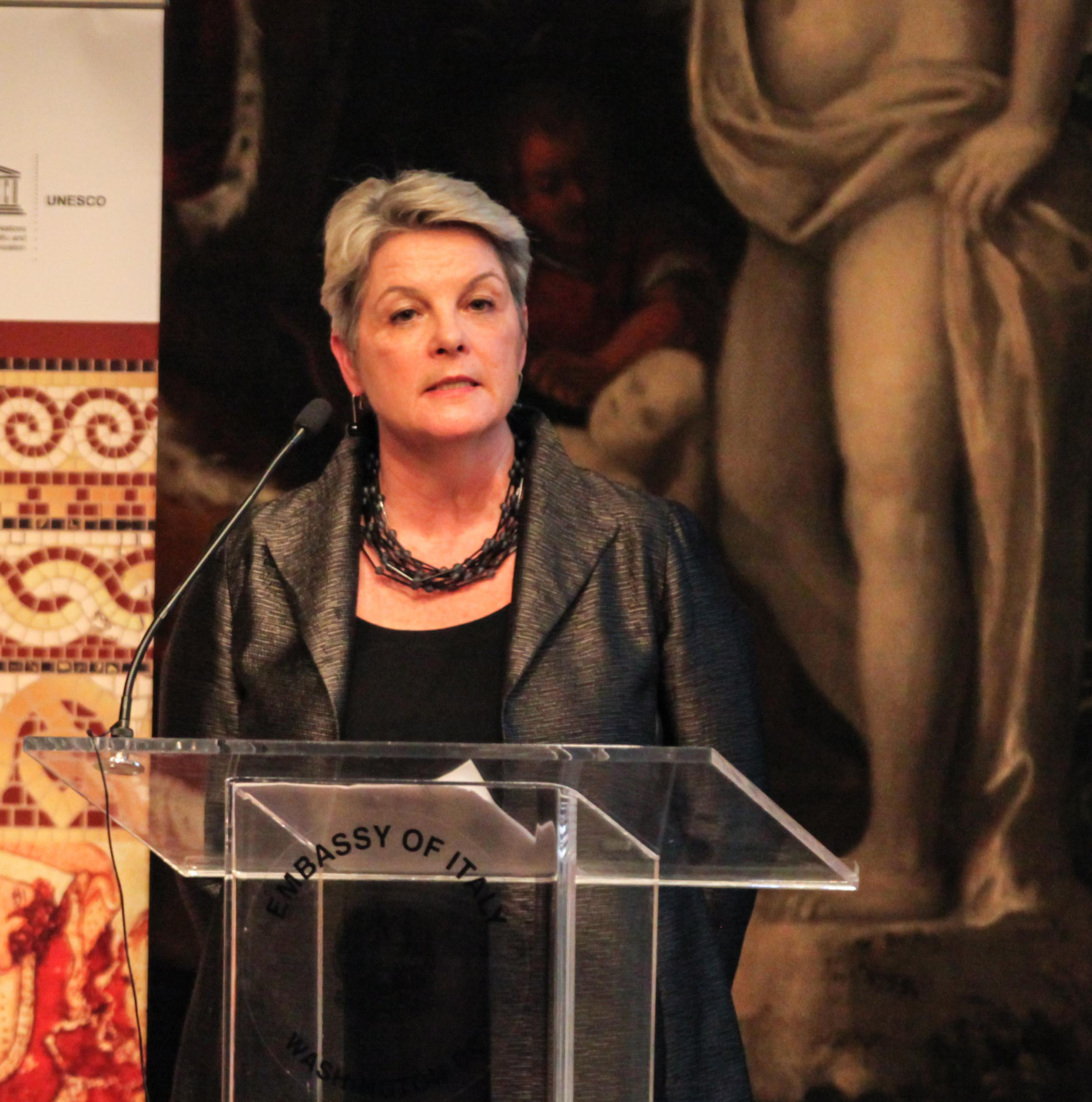
- Wight in 2016
- Education: University of California, Los Angeles (PhD)
- Occupations: Art historian, museum director
- Known for: Glass art and artifacts

Karol B. Wight is a museum administrator and is currently the president and executive director of The Corning Museum of Glass. She specializes in the field of ancient glass.

== Education ==
Wight received her PhD from the University of California Los Angeles in art history. Her doctoral thesis was on the topic of "Mythological beakers and Roman glass production in the first century A.D."

== Career ==
In 2011, Wight was appointed executive director of The Corning Museum of Glass, a museum with a collection of 45,000 glass objects that represent the history, science and art of glass. In 2015 she was appointed president and executive director of the museum. Prior to this appointment, she was senior curator of antiquities at the J. Paul Getty Museum in Malibu, California. She is also curator of ancient and Islamic glass at the museum. Prior to that she held the position of senior curator of antiquities at the J. Paul Getty Museum's Getty Villa in Malibu, California. Over a period of 26 years she held various positions at the Getty.

In 2017, President Barack Obama appointed Wight to an advisory post on the Cultural Property Advisory Committee of the U.S. Department of State.

Wight has published articles and books on ancient glass objects and glass making techniques. Among them are the book, Molten color: glassmaking in antiquity.
