= Candice Stewart =

American TV personality and beauty pageant titleholder

- Born: September 19, 1983 (age 43); Metairie, Louisiana, U.S.
- Education: Xavier University of Louisiana
- Height: 5 ft 7 in (1.70 m)
- Beauty pageant titleholder
- Title: Miss Teen Louisiana American Coed 2000; Miss American Teen 2000; Miss Louisiana Teen USA 2002; Miss Louisiana USA 2005
- Hair color: Brown
- Eye color: Brown
- Major competitions: Miss Teen USA 2002; Miss USA 2005

Candice Dontrelle Stewart (born September 19, 1983) is an American television personality and beauty pageant titleholder from Metairie, Louisiana. She competed in the Miss Teen USA and Miss USA pageants. In addition to her pageantry career, she participated as a HouseGuest on the 15th season of the American reality show Big Brother.

While in the Big Brother house, Stewart received national attention after becoming a victim of racism from fellow HouseGuests Aaryn Williams and GinaMarie Zimmerman. She became the first member of the Big Brother jury house that season.

== Pageant career ==
She captured the Miss Louisiana Teen USA 2002 crown in the state pageant held in Lafayette in late 2001. Stewart then represented Louisiana at the 2002 pageant held at South Padre Island, Texas in August 2002. The pageant was won by Vanessa Semrow of Wisconsin.

In 2003, just a year after passing on her Teen crown, Stewart returned to the Louisiana pageant stage, placing first runner-up to Melissa McConnell in the Miss Louisiana USA 2004 pageant. She won the pageant the following year, on her second attempt, and was the first African American woman to win this title. In April 2005, Stewart competed in the Miss USA 2005 pageant televised live from Baltimore, Maryland. The pageant was won by Chelsea Cooley of North Carolina, who had been Miss North Carolina Teen USA 2000. Stewart was a speech pathology major at Xavier University and was once a dancer for the New Orleans Saints. She was due to give up her crown in November 2005, but the aftermath of Hurricane Katrina in her state meant the pageant was postponed until January 2006. Her successor was Christina Cuenca of Arabi, who had placed in both years Stewart had competed.

== Appearance on Big Brother ==
In 2013, Stewart was selected to appear on the American reality television series Big Brother 15 as a contestant (HouseGuest). On Day 5, McCrae nominated Candice and Jessie for eviction, feeling as though they were the least-liked people in the house. However, McCrae used the Power of Veto to remove Candice from the block, and chose to nominate Elissa in her place. Aaryn chose Candice along with Andy, Elissa, and Helen to be the Have-Nots for the second week. She once again became one of the Have-Nots during week four and five. During week five, Stewart was selected to compete for the Power of Veto competition; however, Spencer won the Power of Veto. On Day 39, Spencer used the Power of Veto to remove himself from the block, with Candice being nominated in his place in an attempt to ensure Howard's eviction. Jessie and Candice, believing that Amanda and McCrae were in control of the game, attempted to get the votes to evict Amanda from the house, though this plan failed. As a result, Candice and Jessie became outcasts in the house, and became the targets for several HouseGuests. During week six, Candice won a $5,000 prize. GinaMarie and her allies decided to target Candice and Jessie for eviction, hoping to see Candice be evicted from the house. On Day 43, GinaMarie chose to nominate Candice and Jessie for eviction. Candice lost the Veto competition and had to wear a "Clownitard" for a week. They also learned that this season would feature nine Jury members, rather than seven. Candice then became the sixth HouseGuest to be evicted when she received seven eviction votes (7–0–0). She became the first member of the Jury of Nine.

During her time in the house, Stewart formed a friendship with Howard Overby. Because of their racial background, she and Overby were the targets of racist comments from fellow HouseGuests, particularly Aaryn Gries and GinaMarie Zimmerman. At one point, Gries said, “Be careful what you say in the dark; you might not be able to see that bitch." Later in the season, during a Veto Competition (where nominees compete for the "Power of Veto", and the holder can decide whether to change the nominations), Stewart got into a dispute with HouseGuest Amanda Zuckerman. Stewart whispered to HouseGuest Judd Daugherty, "They [Zuckerman and her alliance members] think you're the MVP." Zuckerman caught this and started taunting Stewart, calling her "Shaniqua". This was followed by, "Oh, am I racist now? I'm racist now!" In a double eviction on Day 49, Stewart was evicted from the house, placing 11th. During her eviction speech, she stated that "this week, the game got personal" and called out fellow HouseGuest GinaMarie for "saying defamatory comments", which sparked an argument. HouseGuest Spencer Clawson then started his eviction speech in an attempt to settle the two women down after Big Brother host Julie Chen failed to assuage the dispute. After her eviction, Stewart became the first member of the Jury, meaning she was able to influence the game through voting for the winner.

== Personal life ==
In 2006, Stewart earned a bachelor's degree in speech-language pathology and audiology from Xavier University of Louisiana. Previously, she was a cheerleader for the New Orleans Saints.

== See also ==
- Big Brother (franchise) US and English Canadian version
- National Football League Cheerleading

Awards and achievements
Preceded by Melissa McConnell	Miss Louisiana USA; 2005	Succeeded by Christina Cuenca
