= Blown Away (TV series) =

Canadian reality glassblowing competition TV series

- Genre: Reality
- Written by: Ron Carroll; Amy Hosking
- Presented by: Nick Uhas (seasons 1–3); Bobby Berk (Christmas); Hunter March (season 4)
- Country of origin: Canada
- Original language: English
- No. of seasons: 4
- No. of episodes: 44

Production
- Executive producers: Mark J. W. Bishop; Matt Hornburg
- Producers: Ron Carroll; Amy Hosking; Donna Luke; Mike Bickerton; Brett Ashley; Caitlin Dosa; Zoe Kazakos; Ajeeth Parkal; Greg Floyd; Gina Lomas; Topher McFarlane; Jacqui Skeete
- Running time: 23 minutes
- Production company: Marblemedia

Original release
- Network: Makeful
- Release: February 20, 2019 – March 6, 2024

Blown Away is a Canadian reality glassblowing competition television series that premiered on the Canadian channel Makeful before a subsequent release on the streaming platform Netflix. The 10-episode first season was released on July 12, 2019. The series is filmed in Canada and is produced by Marblemedia.

Casting for a second season was announced in November 2019. Season 2 was released on Netflix in January 2021. A four-episode Christmas series was released in November 2021. Season 3 premiered on July 22, 2022. Season 4 premiered on March 8, 2024.

The contestants on the show are 10 glassblowers. Katherine Gray, an artist and associate professor at California State University, San Bernardino, is the chief judge. Nick Uhas, a former Big Brother USA contestant and science YouTuber, hosted the show for its first three seasons. Hunter March became the host for season 4. The winner receives a prize package worth the equivalent of $60,000, including an artist residency at the Corning Museum of Glass. The first season was filmed in a converted warehouse in Hamilton, Ontario, a facility that was "custom-built to accommodate 10 glass blowers working simultaneously". Industry experts from the Craft and Design Glass Studio at Sheridan College, Pilchuck Glass School, and the Corning Museum of Glass consulted the producers during the construction of the facility and provided advice and evaluation to the contestants each round.

== Contestants ==
=== Season 1 ===
| Contestant | Outcome |
|---|---|
| Deborah Czeresko | Winner |
| Janusz Poźniak | Runner-up |
| Alexander Rosenberg | 3rd place |
| Patrick Primeau | 4th place |
| K. Momoko "Momo" Schafer | 5th place |
| Leah Kudel | 6th place |
| Annette Sheppard | 7th place |
| Edgar Valentine | 8th place |
| Benjamin Kikkert | 9th place |
| Kevin Kiff | 10th place |

=== Season 2 ===
| Contestant | Outcome |
|---|---|
| Elliot Walker | Winner |
| Cat Burns | Runner-up |
| Chris Taylor | 3rd place |
| Nao Yamamoto | 4th place |
| Andi Kovel | 5th place |
| Mike Shelbo | 6th place |
| Brad Turner | 7th place |
| Jason McDonald | 8th place |
| Ben Silver | 9th place |
| Tegan Hamilton | 10th place |

=== Blown Away: Christmas ===
| Contestant | Outcome | Blown Away History | |
| Contestant | Outcome | Season | Placement |
|---|---|---|---|
| Cat Burns | Winner | Season 2 | Runner-up |
| Nao Yamamoto | Runner-up | Season 2 | 4th place |
| Alexander Rosenberg | 3rd place | Season 1 | 3rd place |
| Edgar Valentine | 4th place | Season 1 | 8th place |
| Andi Kovel | 5th place | Season 2 | 5th place |

=== Season 3 ===
| Contestant | Outcome |
|---|---|
| John Moran | Winner |
| Minhi Su England | Runner-up |
| John Sharvin | 3rd place |
| Dan Friday | 4th place |
| Trenton Quiocho | 5th place |
| Grace Whiteside | 6th place |
| Brenna Baker | 7th place |
| Maddy Hughes | 8th place |
| Rob Stern | 9th place |
| Claire Kelly | 10th place |

=== Season 4 ===
| Contestant | Outcome |
|---|---|
| Morgan Peterson | Winner |
| Ryan Thompson | Runner-up |
| Jonathan Capps | 3rd place |
| Karen Willenbrink-Johnsen | 4th place |
| Gemma Hollister | 5th place |
| Ryan Blythe | 6th place |
| Leana Quade | 7th place |
| Arthur Wilson | 8th place |
| Robert Burch | 9th place |
| Hayden MacRae | 10th place |

== Episodes ==
| Season | Episodes | Originally released | | |
| Season | Episodes | First released | Last released | Network |
|---|---|---|---|---|
| 1 | 10 | February 20, 2019 | April 24, 2019 | Makeful |
| 2 | 10 | January 22, 2021 | | Netflix |
| Christmas | 4 | November 19, 2021 | | Netflix |
| 3 | 10 | July 22, 2022 | | Netflix |
| 4 | 10 | March 8, 2024 | | Netflix |

=== Season 1 (2019) ===
| No. overall | No. in season | Title | Original release date |
|---|---|---|---|
| 1 | 1 | "Snapshot" | February 20, 2019 |
Guest evaluator: Chris Taylor from the Pilchuck Glass School
| 2 | 2 | "Potluck Party" | February 27, 2019 |
Guest evaluator: Marc Lepine from the restaurant Atelier
| 3 | 3 | "Lighten Up" | March 6, 2019 |
Guest evaluator: Jay Macdonell from the contemporary and design manufacturing company Bocci
| 4 | 4 | "Clash of the Robots" | March 13, 2019 |
Guest evaluator: Jesse Hirsh
| 5 | 5 | "Thirsty Work" | March 20, 2019 |
Guest evaluator: Sommelier Emily Pearce-Bibona
| 6 | 6 | "Pop Art Blowup" | March 27, 2019 |
Guest evaluator: Perry Tung from Bonhams Auction House
| 7 | 7 | "Dual Intent" | April 3, 2019 |
Guest evaluator: Catherine Osborne, former editor-in-chief of the architecture and design magazine Azure
| 8 | 8 | "The Glass is Greener" | April 10, 2019 |
Guest evaluator: Janet Morrison, president of Sheridan College
| 9 | 9 | "Body Parts" | April 17, 2019 |
Guest evaluator: Greta Hodgkinson, principal dancer with the National Ballet of Canada
| 10 | 10 | "Best in Blow" | April 24, 2019 |
Guest evaluator: Eric Meek, from the Corning Museum of Glass

=== Season 2 (2021) ===
| No. overall | No. in season | Title | Original release date |
|---|---|---|---|
| 11 | 1 | "Mirror, Mirror" | January 22, 2021 |
Guest evaluator: Alexander Rosenberg, glass artist and educator, season 1 contestant
| 12 | 2 | "Think Inside the Box" | January 22, 2021 |
Guest evaluator: Benjamin Wright, artist director of Pilchuck Glass School
| 13 | 3 | "Name That Toon" | January 22, 2021 |
Guest evaluator: Kathryn Durst, artist and illustrator
| 14 | 4 | "Force of Nature" | January 22, 2021 |
Guest evaluator: Heather McElwee, executive director at Pittsburgh Glass Center
| 15 | 5 | "Center of Attention" | January 22, 2021 |
Guest evaluator: Bobby Berk, design expert on Queer Eye
| 16 | 6 | "Scents and Sensibility" | January 22, 2021 |
Guest evaluator: Michel Germain, fragrance entrepreneur
| 17 | 7 | "Who's Got Game?" | January 22, 2021 |
Guest evaluator: Stephen Weatherly, defensive end for the Carolina Panthers
| 18 | 8 | "Runway Walk" | January 22, 2021 |
Guest evaluator: Sunny Fong, Project Runway Canada season 2 winner
| 19 | 9 | "Light My Fire" | January 22, 2021 |
Guest evaluator: Deborah Czeresko, glass artist, season 1 winner
| 20 | 10 | "Finale" | January 22, 2021 |
Guest evaluator: Rob Cassetti, former senior director of Corning Museum of Glass

=== Blown Away: Christmas (2021) ===
| No. overall | No. in season | Title | Original release date |
|---|---|---|---|
| 21 | 1 | "Santa's Elves" | November 19, 2021 |
| 22 | 2 | "Festive Food" | November 19, 2021 |
| 23 | 3 | "Oh Christmas Tree" | November 19, 2021 |
| 24 | 4 | "Winter Wonderland" | November 19, 2021 |

=== Season 3 (2022) ===
| No. overall | No. in season | Title | Original release date |
|---|---|---|---|
| 25 | 1 | "The Evolution Will Be Televised" | July 22, 2022 |
Guest evaluator: Deborah Czeresko, glass artist, season 1 winner
| 26 | 2 | "Bottoms Up" | July 22, 2022 |
Guest evaluator: Veronica Saye, award winning cocktail bartender
| 27 | 3 | "2022, The Year of Glass" | July 22, 2022 |
Guest evaluator: Chris Clarke, Director of Operations at the Pittsburgh Glass Center
| 28 | 4 | "Seven Deadly Sins" | July 22, 2022 |
Guest evaluator: Donna Davies, Deputy Director Pilchuck Glass School, Art Historian
| 28 | 5 | "The Bigger the Better" | July 22, 2022 |
Guest evaluator: Briony Douglas, Sculpture artist
| 29 | 6 | "Under the Big Top" | July 22, 2022 |
Guest evaluator: Miranda Tempest, aerial acrobat, circus company owner
| 30 | 7 | "Team Work Makes the Dream Work" | July 22, 2022 |
Guest evaluator: Julia Rogers, Robin Rogers, glass artists
| 31 | 8 | "Out Of This World" | July 22, 2022 |
Guest evaluator: Dr. Marianne Mader, space scientist
| 32 | 9 | "Nothing to Fear But Fear Itself" | July 22, 2022 |
Guest evaluator: Elliot Walker, glass artist, season 2 winner
| 33 | 10 | "Finale" | July 22, 2022 |
Guest evaluator: Susie Silbert, Curator of Postwar and Contemporary Glass at Corning Museum of Glass

=== Season 4 (2024) ===
| No. overall | No. in season | Title | Original release date |

== Results ==
=== Season 1 ===
Elimination chart
| Artist | 1 | 2 | 3 | 4 | 5 | 6 | 7 | 8 | 9 | 10 |
|---|---|---|---|---|---|---|---|---|---|---|
| Deborah | | | | BEST | | | BEST | | BEST | WINNER |
| Janusz | | BEST | | | BEST | BEST | | | | Runner Up |
| Alexander | BEST | | | | | | | BEST | OUT | |
| Patrick | | | | | | | BEST | OUT | | |
| Momo | | | | | | OUT | | | | |
| Leah | | | BEST | | OUT | | | | | |
| Annette | | | | OUT | | | | | | |
| Edgar | | | OUT | | | | | | | |
| Benjamin | | OUT | | | | | | | | |
| Kevin | OUT | | | | | | | | | |

=== Season 2 ===
Elimination chart
| Artist | 1 | 2 | 3 | 4 | 5 | 6 | 7 | 8 | 9 | 10 |
|---|---|---|---|---|---|---|---|---|---|---|
| Elliot | BEST | | | BEST | | BEST | | | BEST | WINNER |
| Cat | | | BEST | | | | | BEST | | Runner Up |
| Chris | | BEST | | | | | BEST | | OUT | |
| Nao | | | | | BEST | | | OUT | | |
| Andi | | | | | | | OUT | | | |
| Mike | | | | | OUT | | | | | |
| Brad | | | | OUT | | | | | | |
| Jason | | | OUT | | | | | | | |
| Ben | | OUT | | | | | | | | |
| Tegan | OUT | | | | | | | | | |

=== Blown Away: Christmas ===
Elimination chart
| Artist | 1 | 2 | 3 | 4 |
|---|---|---|---|---|
| Cat | BEST | BEST | | WINNER |
| Nao | | | BEST | Runner Up |
| Alexander | | | OUT | |
| Edgar | | OUT | | |
| Andi | OUT | | | |

=== Season 3 ===
Elimination chart
| Artist | 1 | 2 | 3 | 4 | 5 | 6 | 7 | 8 | 9 | 10 |
|---|---|---|---|---|---|---|---|---|---|---|
| John M | | | BEST | | BEST | | BEST | BEST | BEST | WINNER |
| Minhi | | BEST | | | BEST | | | | | Runner Up |
| John S | | | | | | BEST | BEST | | OUT | |
| Dan | BEST | | | | | | | OUT | | |
| Trenton | | | | | | OUT | | | | |
| Grace | | | | BEST | OUT | | | | | |
| Brenna | | | | OUT | | | | | | |
| Maddy | | | OUT | | | | | | | |
| Rob | | OUT | | | | | | | | |
| Claire | OUT | | | | | | | | | |

=== Season 4 ===
Elimination chart
| Artist | 1 | 2 | 3^{1} | 4 | 5 | 6 | 7 | 8 | 9^{2} | 10 |
|---|---|---|---|---|---|---|---|---|---|---|
| Morgan | | BEST | | BEST | | | | | BEST | WINNER |
| Ryan T | | | | | BEST | BEST | | | | Runner Up |
| Jonathan | BEST | | | | | | | BEST | OUT | |
| Karen | | | BEST | | | | BEST | OUT | | |
| Gemma | | | BEST | | | | OUT | | | |
| Ryan B | | | | | | OUT | | | | |
| Quade | | | | | OUT | | | | | |
| Arthur | | | | OUT | | | | | | |
| Robert | | OUT | | | | | | | | |
| Hayden | OUT | | | | | | | | | |

^Note 1: No contestants were eliminated in this episode.
^Note 2: Jonathan won the quick blow challenge and an extra 20 minutes to complete the main challenge.

Colour key:

Artist got through to the next round.
Artist was eliminated.
Artist was the Best in Blow.
Artist was a series runner-up.
Artist was the series winner.

== Reception ==
Blown Away received a positive review from Joel Keller of Decider who compared it to Top Chef and The Great British Bake Off. The Fader praised the series as rising above other competition shows and being educational.

== Awards ==
| 2020 | Canadian Screen Awards | Reality/Competition Program or Series | Nominated |
| 2020 | Canadian Screen Awards | Production Design or Art Direction, Non-Fiction - Tim Luke | Nominated |
| 2020 | Canadian Screen Awards | Best Direction - Reality or Competition - Mike Bickerton | Won |
