= Nick Uhas =

American-Hungarian TV host

- Born: March 30, 1985 (age 41); Hilliard, Ohio, U.S.
- Education: Miami University, Ohio State University
- Occupations: Actor, writer, YouTuber
- Writing career
- Language: English
- Website: nickuhas.com

Nick Uhas (born March 30, 1985) is an American TV host, former professional aggressive inline skater, actor and YouTuber. Originally a part of CBS's Big Brother 15, Uhas gained attention after working as a producer and host for The Weather Channel, DreamWorksTV, and Fox's nationally syndicated Saturday-morning TV show FabLab. He is also the creator of the brand Nickipedia where Uhas hosts and produces content that can be seen on his YouTube channel and national broadcast TV programs.

== Early life and education ==
In 2003, Uhas graduated from Hilliard Davidson High School where he was a member of the wrestling team. After graduation Uhas and his dad took a journey around the world in less than 80 days.

Uhas attended Miami University but took a hiatus during his freshman year to pursue a career in aggressive inline skating in the San Diego area. After placing 7th in the North American World Championships in the Aggressive Skating Association, Uhas qualified as a professional and skated for sponsors including Team Rollerblade USA and Razor Skate Co.

== Career ==
Uhas is known for introducing science-focused media to his YouTube Channel "Nickipedia," which has been featured on media outlets such as BuzzFeed.

In June 2013, Uhas was cast in the 15th season of CBS's reality TV show Big Brother. He was the second evicted houseguest that season.

In 2014, Uhas hosted and produced a science show for The Weather Channel called Brain Storm in collaboration with BASE Productions.

By 2015, Uhas gained notoriety after he was invited to travel to Sydney, Australia, to perform three popular science experiments from his YouTube channel on the national news show The Today Show with Karl Stefanovic. He repeated his performance by performing more experiments on NBC's Today Show. Later that year in October, Uhas began appearing and producing science-demo segments for The Dr. Oz Show.

In addition to his online platform, Uhas also currently hosts a nationally syndicated science-based Fox Saturday morning TV show FabLab.

After a stint on America's Got Talent, Uhas was brought on to host the Netflix show Blown Away. The series, which pits glassblowers against one another in the competition TV genre, premiered on Netflix on July 12, 2019.
