= Josh Owen =

American industrial designer

Josh Owen is an American industrial designer, educator, and author. He heads a design studio, and is the Vignelli Distinguished Professor of Design and the Director of the Vignelli Center for Design Studies at The Rochester Institute of Technology.

== Biography ==
Owen was born in Philadelphia, USA in 1970. He graduated from Cornell University in 1994 with a B.F.A. in sculpture and a B.A. in visual studies. In 1997 he received an M.F.A. in furniture design from the Rhode Island School of Design.

Owen began his teaching career at Philadelphia University in 1999 where he held The Craig R. Benson Chair for Innovation. He also taught a product design course at the University of Pennsylvania School of Design. Owen joined the Industrial Design program at The Rochester Institute of Technology, in 2010 where he occupied a leadership role for a decade. In 2020 Owen became the Vignelli Distinguished Professor of Design and Director of the Vignelli Center for Design Studies.

Owen founded his professional design practice in 1998. In 2005 it was officially named Josh Owen LLC. His professional projects are produced by major international manufacturers including Areaware, Heller, Casamania, Kontextur, Kikkerland, Loll Designs, Nambe, OTHR and Umbra.

Owen has been the winner of seven Chicago Athenaeum Good Design Awards, the International Design Award, and has received honorable mentions for the ID Annual Design Review and the Red Dot Design Award. Owen is the author of the book Big Ideas / Small Packages and Lenses for Design. His work is included in the permanent design collections of the Design Museum Brussels, Centre Georges Pompidou, the Corning Museum of Glass, the Denver Art Museum, the Philadelphia Museum of Art, the Chicago Athenaeum, the Montreal Museum of Fine Arts, the National Museum of American Jewish History and the Taiwan Design Museum. His work has been featured in major exhibitions, numerous books on design, and is regularly included in critical design discourse.

== Publications ==
- Big Ideas / Small Packages. Philadelphia: Woodsphere Publishing. 2006. ISBN 0-9767723-0-2.
- Lenses for Design. Rochester, NY: RIT Press. 2016. ISBN 978-1-939125-33-0.
