= Andi Kovel =

American designer, installation artist and glass artist

Andi Kovel (born April 29, 1969, in Rochester New York) is an American designer, installation artist and glass artist best known for her appearance on the Netflix original series Blown Away Season 2. She is also known for her ADX Award nominated home accessories brand Esque Studio. credited for helping redefine hand-blown glass as high design and functional art.

Kovel has exhibited in the Venice Bienele Homo Faber produced by the Michelangelo foundation 2024. Art basil miami nada opening event 2022.

== Education ==
In 1991, Kovel graduated from the University of Colorado Boulder with a Bachelor of Fine Arts in sculpture and continued with a degree in art education and theory from The School of Visual Arts and New York University in 1997.

== Career ==
In 2021 Kovel was one of 10 contestants in the second season of the Netflix original series Blown Away.

Her original glass works are in the permanent collection of the Tacoma Museum of Glass, Cooper Hewitt Museum of Design, and the Shanghai Museum of Glass

In 2018, she & Esque Studio partner, Justin Parker, won best lighting design of the year from NYCXDESIGN and Interior Design Magazine in collaboration with Harry Allen Design

Andi Kovel resume
