= Mehrafza Mirzazad Barijugh =

Iranian industrial designer

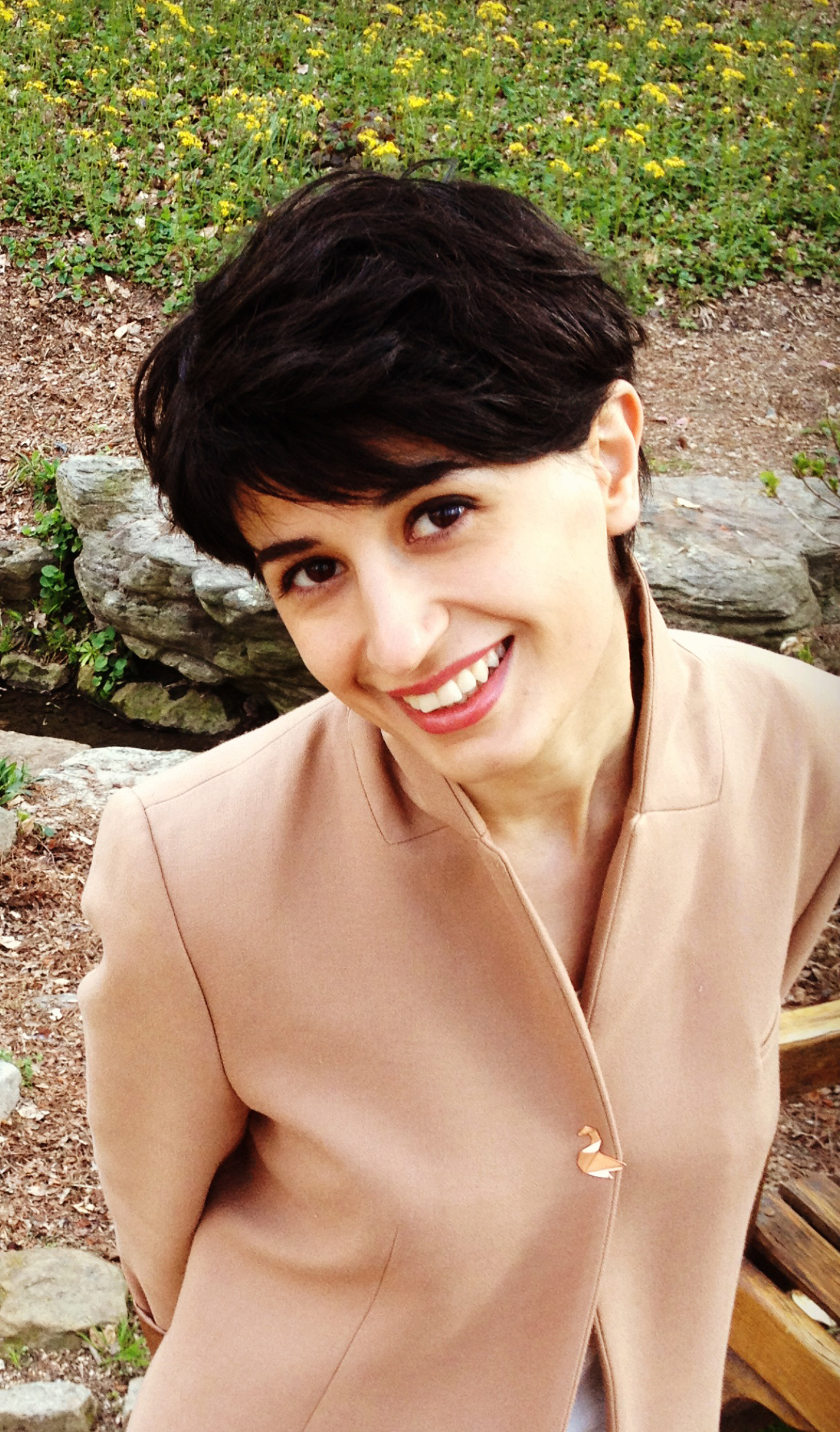
Mehrafza Mirzazad Barijugh in Chapel Hill, North Carolina, 2013

Mehrafza Mirzazad Barijugh (Oroumieh, 8 September 1985) is an Iranian industrial designer, living in the United States. She completed her studies in industrial design at Middle East Technical University (METU) in Ankara, Turkey. In 2010, she became the first female designer from either Iran or Turkey to be presented with the Red Dot Award: Design Concept Best of the Best prize for her ETU (Emergency Transporter Unit for Amputated Body Parts) design.

== Biography ==
Mirzazad Barijugh was born in Oroumieh, Iran. She studied at the prestigious National Organization for Development of Exceptional Talents school during her middle and high school years. At the age of 18, she moved to Turkey to study industrial design at Middle East Technical University (METU), in Ankara. During her studies at METU, her work emphasized the design of medical products. After graduating in 2009, she moved to Istanbul, where she worked as a freelance industrial designer. In addition to her freelance work, Mirzazad Barijugh continues to work on conceptual medical products. In 2012, she received a Design Turkey award for an accident site blood-testing device, a project she collaborated on with Turkish designers Efe Erinç Erdoğu and Rasim İspirgil. In 2013, she designed an insulin distribution system for diabetes patients.

She relocated her offices to Carrboro, North Carolina, in 2013.

== Awards ==
- Red Dot Award: Design Concept Best of the Best (2010)
- Design Turkey: Good Design Award (2010)
- Faces of Design: Talent Award (2010)
- İMMİB: Endüstriyel Tasarım Yarışmaları (2011)
- Design Turkey: Good Design Award (2012).
- Ignite: Diabetes Ideas Challenge Award (2013)
