= Helen Lee (artist) =

MIT graduate

Helen Lee is an artist, glassblower, designer, and educator.

== Education and career ==
Lee was born in Summit, NJ in 1978 in Summit, New Jersey. Lee graduated from Massachusetts Institute of Technology in 2000 with a Bachelor of Science in Art and Design with a concentrations in Architectural Design and Writing. In 2006 she earned a Master of Arts with a concentration in Glass from the Rhode Island School of Design. Lee has worked as a designer and glass artist for over ten years.

She is currently an associate professor and Head of Glass at University of Wisconsin-Madison. Her work deals themes of language as signifier of meaning and physical form. She describes her practice as an "examination of boundary, duality, and transformation—dwelling on the moments in which breath becomes sound, sound becomes spoken, the spoken word turns written, and the written word is shaped into dimensional form by her own breath." She rendering are often innovative in their process, such as her Alpha-Zanfirico work, based in graphic and digital design. These twisty canes, designed using MIT's VirtualGlass program, are contained in orbs or glass droplets which when cross-sectioned reveal lowercase letters in black.

She has taught and lead workshops at the Rhode Island School of Design, the California College of the Arts, Toyama City Institute of Glass Art, Haystack Mountain School of Crafts, Pilchuck Glass School, the Chrysler Museum Glass Studio, and the MIT Glass Lab. From 2009-2011 she was an Affiliate Artist at Headlands Center for the Arts.
