= Jesse Hirsh =

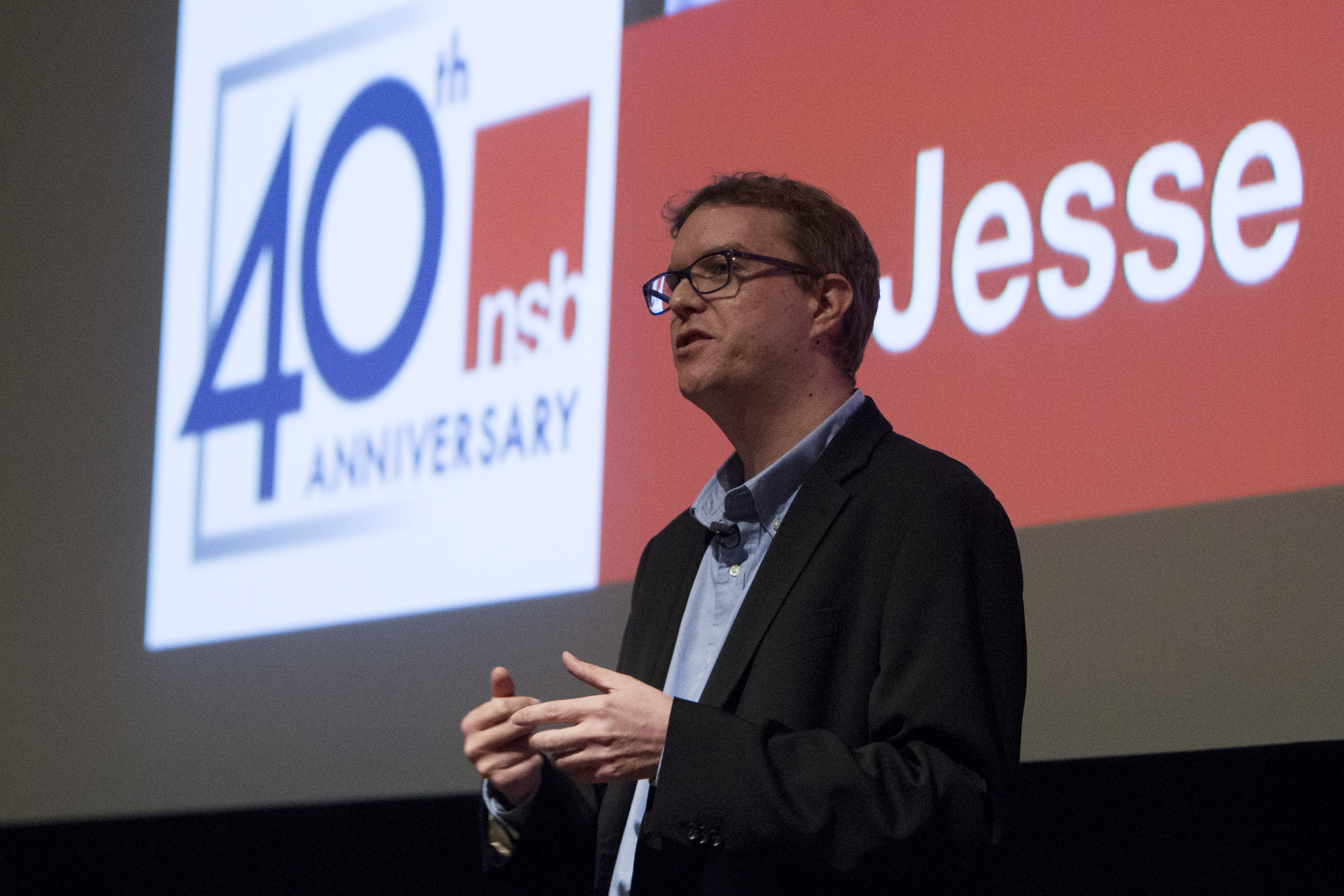
Jesse Hirsh at National Speakers Bureau Engage Speaker Talks

Jesse Hirsh is a broadcaster, researcher, public speaker and Internet evangelist in Toronto, Ontario, Canada. He has appeared on CBC Radio, and has a weekly spot on CBC Newsworld where he explains and analyses trends and developments in technology. He co-hosts an interfaith show on Omni Television called 3D: Dialogue.

== Personal life ==
Hirsh was educated at the McLuhan Program in Culture and Technology at the University of Toronto.

In 1995, while studying there, Hirsh was arrested for unauthorized use of a computer.
