= Tom Joyce =

American sculptor

William Thomas Joyce
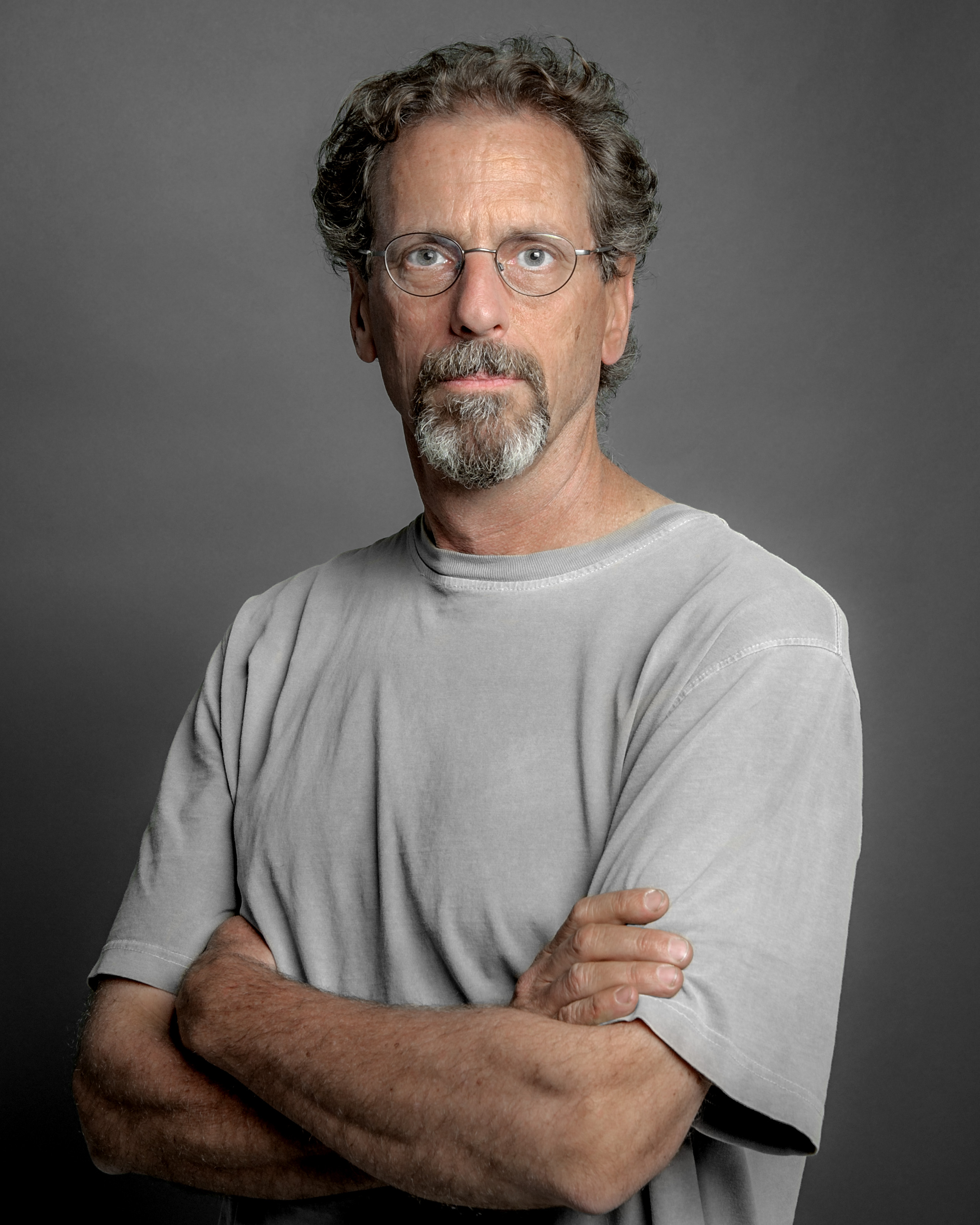
- Born: October 28, 1956 (age 69); Tulsa, Oklahoma
- Education: Life Experience
- Known for: Sculpture
- Spouse: Anne-Marie Bouttiaux
- Awards: MacArthur Fellow; US Artists Fellowship
- Website: www.tomjoycestudio.com

Signature
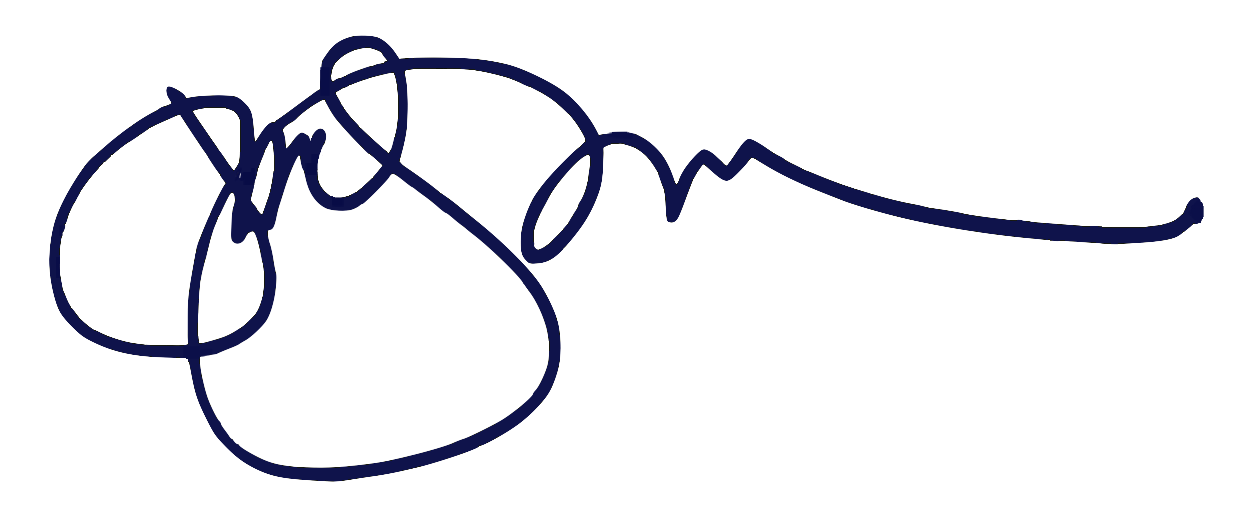

Tom Joyce (born 1956) is a sculptor and MacArthur Fellow known for his work in forged steel and cast iron. Using skills and technology acquired through early training as a blacksmith, Joyce addresses the environmental, political, and social implications of using iron in his work. Exhibited internationally since the 1980s, his work is included in 30-plus public collections in the U.S. and abroad. Joyce works in Santa Fe, New Mexico producing sculpture, drawings, prints, photographs, and videos that reference themes of iron in the human body, iron in industry, and iron in the natural world.

== Early life and career ==
Born in Tulsa, Oklahoma in 1956, the oldest of four siblings, Joyce attributes accompanying his father on summer archeological excavations conducted for the University of Oklahoma in the 1960s as a significant influence toward choosing a life of working with his hands. Joyce stated in a 2008 lecture at the Segal Design Institute at Northwestern University in Chicago: "As a pre-teen adolescent, unearthing disparate shards of once complete objects, made from diverse materials, and attempting to visualize the whole form from fragments, has instructed my practice as an artist to the present day." When his family moved to El Rito in Northern New Mexico in 1970, at age 14 Joyce began an informal apprenticeship with neighbor Peter Wells, a letterpress printer and blacksmith. Joyce learned to handset type on foot-operated 19th century printing presses and was taught the rudiments of hand forging while assisting Wells on the restoration of historic printing equipment for the Museum of New Mexico's Print Shop and Bindery. At 16, after three summers of working with Wells, Joyce was offered the blacksmith shop when Wells relocated his printing business, the former Sunflower Press. Joyce quit high school to devote himself full-time to learning the trade and developed a classically oriented curriculum of studying historic ironwork in the storage collections of New Mexico's many museums. He supported himself through a wide range of commissions from farmers, ranchers, builders, architects, designers, and other artists.

In 1977 Joyce moved to Santa Fe, New Mexico, establishing a larger studio to design and produce contemporary objects for homes, architecture, and public art. He initiated an apprenticeship program in 1979 that offered training to students from the U.S. and abroad. A McCune Foundation grant received in 1996 expanded the program to include "at risk" middle and high school students, giving New Mexico youth an opportunity to learn metalworking techniques in free, after-school classes.

Since Joyce's first lecture on his work at the University of Wisconsin, De Pere in 1982, he has presented at numerous institutions, universities and college campuses throughout the United States and abroad. As an invited U.S. delegate, panelist, and keynote speaker, he has participated in conferences and symposia in Canada, Czech Republic, Belgium, England, Finland, Ireland, Italy, South Africa and Sweden. In 1989, while lecturing at the First International Festival of Iron in Cardiff, Wales, Joyce, along with German artist Achim Kuhn, were given the Highest Honorary Fellowship into the Worshipful Company of Blacksmiths with the Addy Taylor Cup. It was the first time the award had been given to a non-British blacksmith since the charter was formed in 1571.

Throughout the 1990s, Joyce gradually reduced the number of commissions to focus more exclusively on series of work for galleries, including folded bowls based on formal geometric proportions, wall pieces made from remnant material accumulated from his previous commission works, and sculpture incorporating plaster, books, newspaper, wood and iron. In 1996, eighty works of art were exhibited in a mid-career retrospective, Tom Joyce: Twenty Years, organized by the National Metal Museum in Memphis, Tennessee, the first major survey of the artist's work.

In 2001, Joyce began exploratory working relationships with several forging and casting facilities to realize sculpture and drawings on a larger scale. In an ongoing series of work titled Sotto Voce, alluding to the hidden origins of the material he utilizes, Joyce conceptually references the part industrial blacksmiths perform within the current era since the 19th century industrial revolution.

Working hands-on in various industrial settings, multi-ton remnants from parts being manufactured for multinational corporations, government agencies, and military forces around the world are forged into sculptures that appear at first as soft as clay. Cutting, folding and eroding the material transforms what were once semi-recognizable shapes, into sculptures that refer to the parent material's current use, wherever it may be employed in the world.

== Works ==
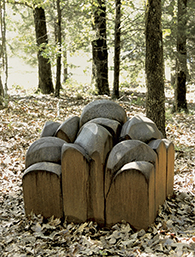
Bloom III (2005)
Forged high carbon steel
28" x 30" x 30"

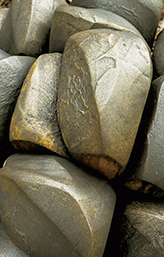
Bloom III, detail (2005)
Forged high carbon steel
28" x 30" x 30"

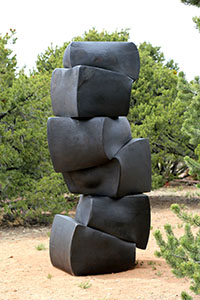
Stack IV (2014)
Forged high carbon steel
108" x 46" x 46" (45,000 lbs)

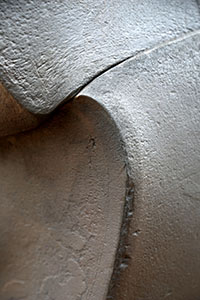
Stack IV, detail (2014)
Forged high carbon steel
108" x 46" x 46" (45,000 lbs)
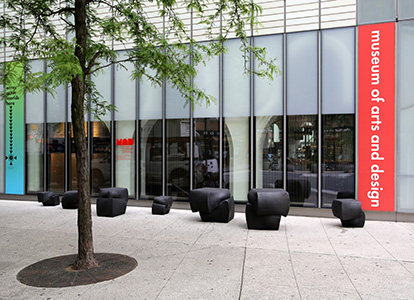
Two to One (2007/2014)
Museum of Arts and Design
Forged stainless steel
30" x 360" x 84"

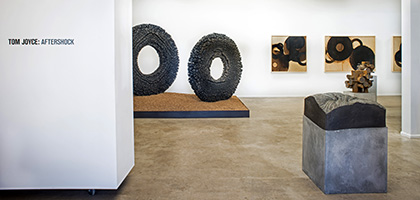
Aftershock (2014)
Exhibition view
James Kelly Contemporary

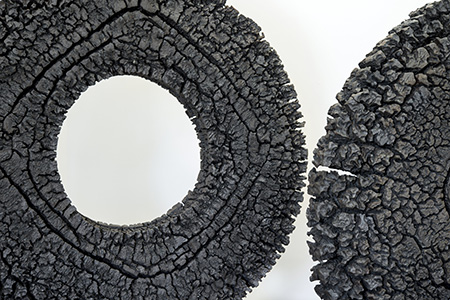
Aureole I & II (2015)
Forged high carbon steel
75" x 75" x 8" (6,492 lbs) &
74" x 74" x 7" (5,660 lbs)

== Exhibitions ==
Exhibiting internationally since 1981, Joyce's work has been shown at the National Museum Cardiff; Stadt Galerie, Lünen, Germany; Graf-Zeppelin Haus, Friedrichshafen, Germany; Exposición Central, Guadalajara, Mexico; Lounais-Suomen Käsi-ja Taideteollisuusoppilaitos, Mynämäki, Finland; Steiglitz Museum of Applied Arts, Moscow, Russia; and Musée des Arts Décoratifs, Paris, France.

In the US, Joyce has exhibited at the Museum of Arts and Design, New York, New York; Alfred University Art Museum, Alfred, New York; Renwick Gallery, Smithsonian Institution; Minneapolis Institute of Art; National Building Museum, Washington, D.C.; Detroit Institute of Arts; Houston Museum of Contemporary Craft; Museum of Fine Arts; New Mexico Museum of Art and Center for Contemporary Arts, Santa Fe, New Mexico; Albuquerque Museum; Luce Foundation Center for American Art, Smithsonian American Art Museum, Washington, D.C.; Mint Museum, Charlotte, North Carolina; National Metal Museum, Memphis, Tennessee; and the Storefront for Art and Architecture, New York, New York.

== Collections ==
Permanent public collections of Joyce's work are held at the National September 11 Memorial & Museum New York, New York; Museum of Arts and Design; Smithsonian Institution, Washington, DC; Minneapolis Institute of Art; Detroit Institute of Arts; New Mexico Museum of Art; Luce Foundation Center for American Art, Smithsonian American Art Museum; Mint Museum; National Metal Museum; Museum of Fine Arts; Fuller Craft Museum, Brockton, Massachusetts; and Yale University Art Gallery, New Haven, Connecticut.

== Awards ==
- 2013 - John Michael Kohler Art/Industry Residency
- 2011 - United States Artists Windgate Fellow
- 2009 - Governor's Award for Excellence in the Arts
- 2007 - Artist of the Year, Santa Fe Gallery Association
- 2006 - Distinguished Artist of the Year Award, Rotary Foundation for the Arts
- 2003 - John D. and Catherine T. MacArthur Foundation Fellowship
- 2003 - Aileen Osborn Webb Award, American Craft Council's College of Fellows
- 2002 - John Michael Kohler Art/Industry Residency
- 1996 - Honorary Award for Outstanding Contribution to the Art and Science of Blacksmithing, Artist-Blacksmith's Association of North America

== Honors ==
- 2014 - Honorary Doctorate, Santa Fe University of Art and Design
- 2009 - Commissioned to design and execute the MacArthur Foundation Award for International Justice awarded to Richard J. Goldstone
- 2008 - Commissioned to design and execute the inaugural MacArthur Foundation Award for International Justice awarded to Kofi Annan
- 2007 - Featured in the PBS television documentary series, Craft in America
- 2007 - 21st Century Luminarias and Legacy Project, New Mexico Community Foundation
- 2004 - Smithsonian Institution's Oral History Program interview, Archives of American Art
- 1989 - Highest Honorary Fellowship into the Worshipful Company of Blacksmiths, London, England
