= Corning Museum of Glass =

Museum in Corning, New York

- Interactive fullscreen map
- Established: 1951
- Location: Corning, New York, United States
- Coordinates: 42°08′59″N 77°03′15″W
- Visitors: 400,000 (2012)
- Website: www.cmog.org

The Corning Museum of Glass (CMoG) is a museum in Corning, New York, United States, dedicated to the art, history, and science of glass. It was founded in 1951 by Corning Glass Works (renamed Corning Incorporated in 1989) and currently has a collection of more than 50,000 glass objects, some over 3,500 years old.

== History ==
The Corning Museum of Glass, originally founded as an educational institution for Corning was established as a not-for-profit known as The Corning Glass Center, in 1951, commemorating the company's 100th anniversary. Thomas S. Buechner, who would later become director of the Brooklyn Museum, was the founding director of the glass museum, serving in the post from 1951 to 1960 and again from 1973 to 1980.

Karol Wight has been the executive director of the museum since 2011, and its president since 2015.

=== Growth and Renovations ===
The Gunnar Birkets Addition in February 2022

The original footprint of the museum, library, and auditorium were housed in an international style building designed by Harrison & Abramovitz in 1951. The complex of buildings continued to grow from there, and now represents a number of architectural styles. Gunnar Birkerts developed a new modernist addition which featured several new gallery spaces that flow continuously from one to the next, which was opened on May 28, 1980.

As part of a five year, 65 million dollar plan to overhaul the musuem, a glass-blowing teaching facility, known as The Studio, opened for classes in 1996. More planned renovations and additions by Smith-Miller + Hawkinson were completed in 2001, with exhibition spaces designed by Ralph Appelbaum Associates. These additions supported additional program of a new addmissions lobby, cafe, retail space, sculpture gallery, and glass demonstration stage. The admissions lobby features a system of steel-supported frameless glass plate.

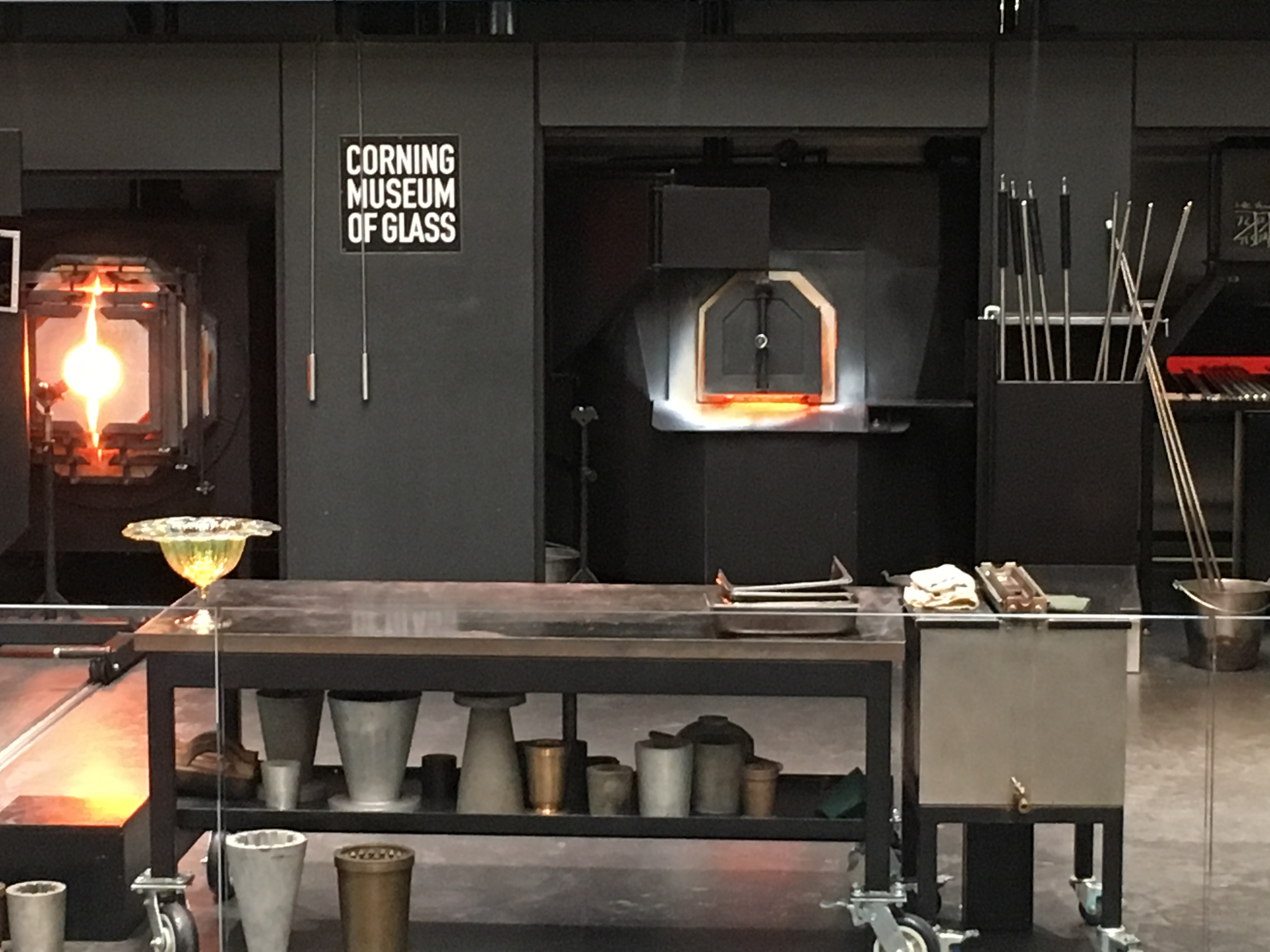
Hot glass workshop with bench and furnace openings

2001 also saw the completion of new facility to house the accumulated collection of the Rakow Research Library. This facility, designed by Bohlin Cywinski Jackson, offered better security, environmental controls, and flood mitigation measures to protect sensitive materials within the colleciton. The design features extensive architectural glass elements including glass stairs and bridges, and a glass sun shading system on the extreior facade.

In 2012, the museum again expanded, with a redesign by Thomas Phifer. The Contemporary Art + Design Wing opened on March 20, 2015.

In October, 2024, the museum officially opened a $55.3 million expansion of The Studio from 24,000 square feet (2,200 m^{2}) to 60,000 square feet (5,600 m^{2}). The expansion provides space for artists and students for short and long-term residency. The Residency Center also hosts the Glassmaking Institute, which offers a two-year program.

=== 1972 Flood ===
In June 1972, Hurricane Agnes severely damaged the museum. A case holding 600 rare books was tipped over, and the books were covered by mud and shards of glass panes. Half of the entire library collection was damaged in the flood, and according to Martin and Edwards, 528 of the museum's 13,000 objects had sustained damage.

During the extensive recovery efforts, the library occupied an abandoned Acme grocery store across the street from the museum. Altogether, staff and volunteers dried, cleaned, and restored over 7,000 water-logged and frozen books over the next two years. The rare books were sent to Carolyn Price Horton, a leading restoration expert, who disassembled, washed, deacidified, and rebound them. On August 1, 1972, the museum reopened with restoration work still underway.

== The Glass Collection ==
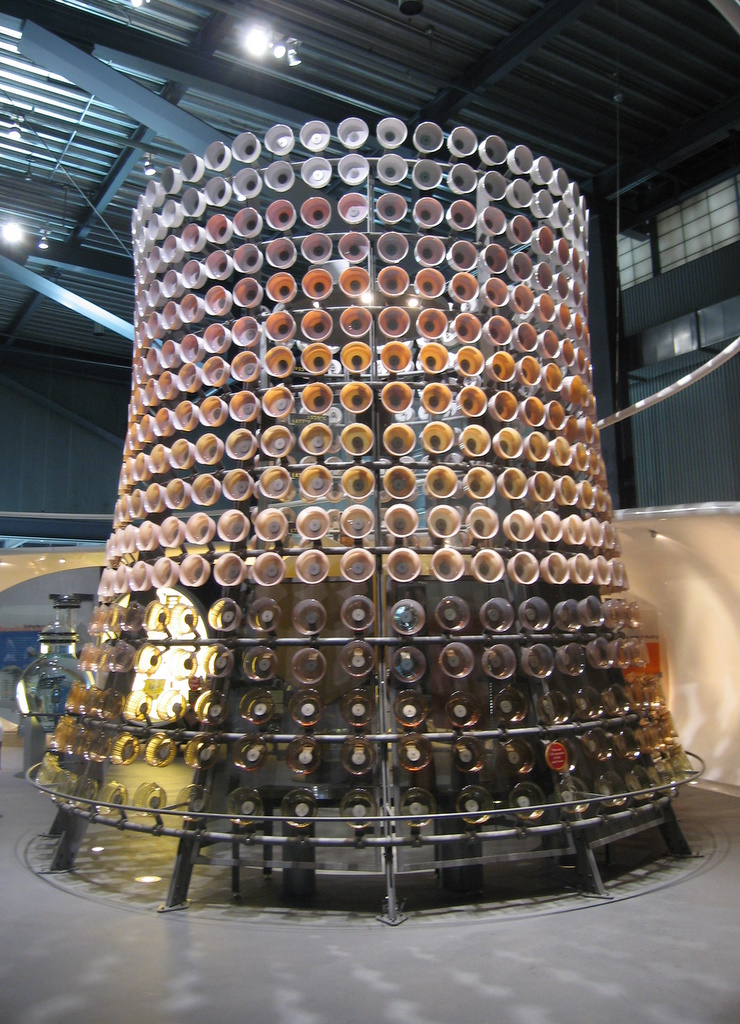
Tower sculpture consisting of 600 glass bowls

=== Galleries ===
The museum's collection of contemporary artworks includes pieces by significant artists such as Lino Tagliapietra, Dante Marioni, Klaus Moje, Karen LaMonte, Dale Chihuly, Libenský / Brychtová, Ginny Ruffner and Josiah McElheny. The galleries include: Glass in Nature, Origins of Glassmaking, Glass of the Romans, Glass in the Islamic World, Early Northern European Glass, The Rise of Venetian Glassmaking, Glass in 17th–19th Century Europe, 19th Century European Glass, Asian Glass, Glass in America, Corning: From Farm Town to "Crystal City", Paperweights of the World and Modern Glass.

In addition to these galleries, there is the Jerome and Lucille Strauss Study Gallery, Frederick Carder Gallery, Ben W. Heineman Sr. Gallery of Contemporary Glass, and the Contemporary Glass Gallery.

The Contemporary Art + Design Gallery in 2023

The museum's Ben W. Heineman Sr. Family Gallery of Contemporary Glass focuses on vessels, objects, sculptures, and installations made by international artists from 1975 to 2010. The purpose of the gallery is to show the different ways in which glass is used in art, craft, and design. The gallery is named for the Ben W. Heineman Sr. family, who donated a major collection of contemporary glass to the museum in 2005.

=== Exhibitions ===
The CMoG offers exhibitions year-round. Past exhibitions have included: Medieval Glass for Popes, Princes and Peasants, East Meets West: Cross-Cultural Influences in Glassmaking in the 18th and 19th Centuries and Mirror to Discovery: The 200-Inch Disk and the Hale Reflecting Telescope at Palomar. Several special exhibitions are offered at the museum and the Rakow Research Library each year, from shows focused on specific artists to major exhibitions on important topics in glass and glass history.

=== The Rakow Commission ===
Inaugurated in 1986 by the CMOG, the Rakow Commission supports the development of new works of art in glass. This program, which provides $25,000 each year, is made possible through the late Dr. and Mrs. Leonard S. Rakow, who were museum fellows and benefactors of the museum. Each commissioned work is added to the museum's collection and is displayed publicly for the first time during the annual seminar.

== Selected collection highlights ==
Christ Falls on the Road to Cavalry

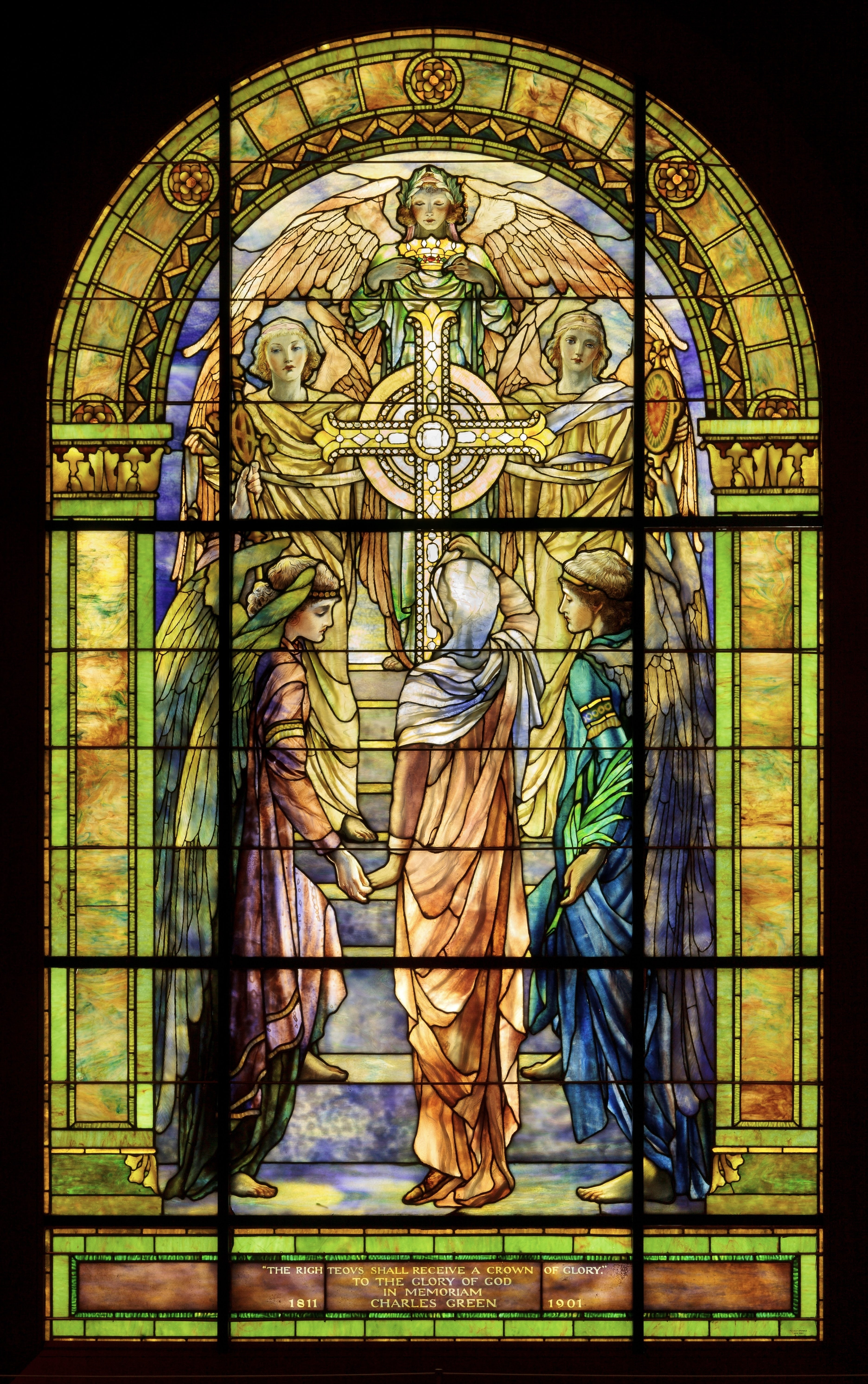
Louis Comfort Tiffany

== Glassmaking ==
Visitors can watch live glassmaking, or learn to make glass at the museum.

The museum offers several live glassmaking demonstrations. The Hot Glass Show is a demonstration where one of the museum's glass blowers provides a live glass-blowing demonstration, which is also narrated by another of the glass blowers. The Hot Glass Show is performed at the museum, and on the road.

At the museum, the Hot Glass Show is offered daily and is included in the cost of admission. At each demonstration, the glassmaker takes a glob of molten glass and shapes it into vases, bowls, or sculptures. Throughout the demonstration, a narrator describes the process, and cameras give viewers a close-up look into the furnaces where the glass is heated. The show gives viewers a look into an ancient Roman technique that is still used today for glass making. Each show lasts between 20 and 40 minutes. The museum takes the Hot Glass Show on the road, bringing the demonstration to the public, designers, and other museums in the US and abroad.

=== GlassLab ===
GlassLab is the design program at the museum. GlassLab's focus on material and process aims to help designers and artists realize new forms, functions and meanings for glass. The program is by invitation only and provides designers with access to explore concepts in glass. GlassLab designers come from various disciplines, such as product, graphic, and fashion design. In public "design performances" or private workshops, designers and glassmakers collaborate and prototype design concepts.

Some of the artists and designers who have participated in the program include, Shin and Tomoko Azumi, Mehrafza Mirzazad Barijugh, Constantin and Laurene Boym, Stephen Burks, the Campana brothers, Matali Crasset, Michele Oka Doner, James Irvine, Helen Lee, Arik Levy, Abbott Miller, Josh Owen, Georgianna Stout, Masamichi Udagawa, and Massimo Vignelli.

== Research ==
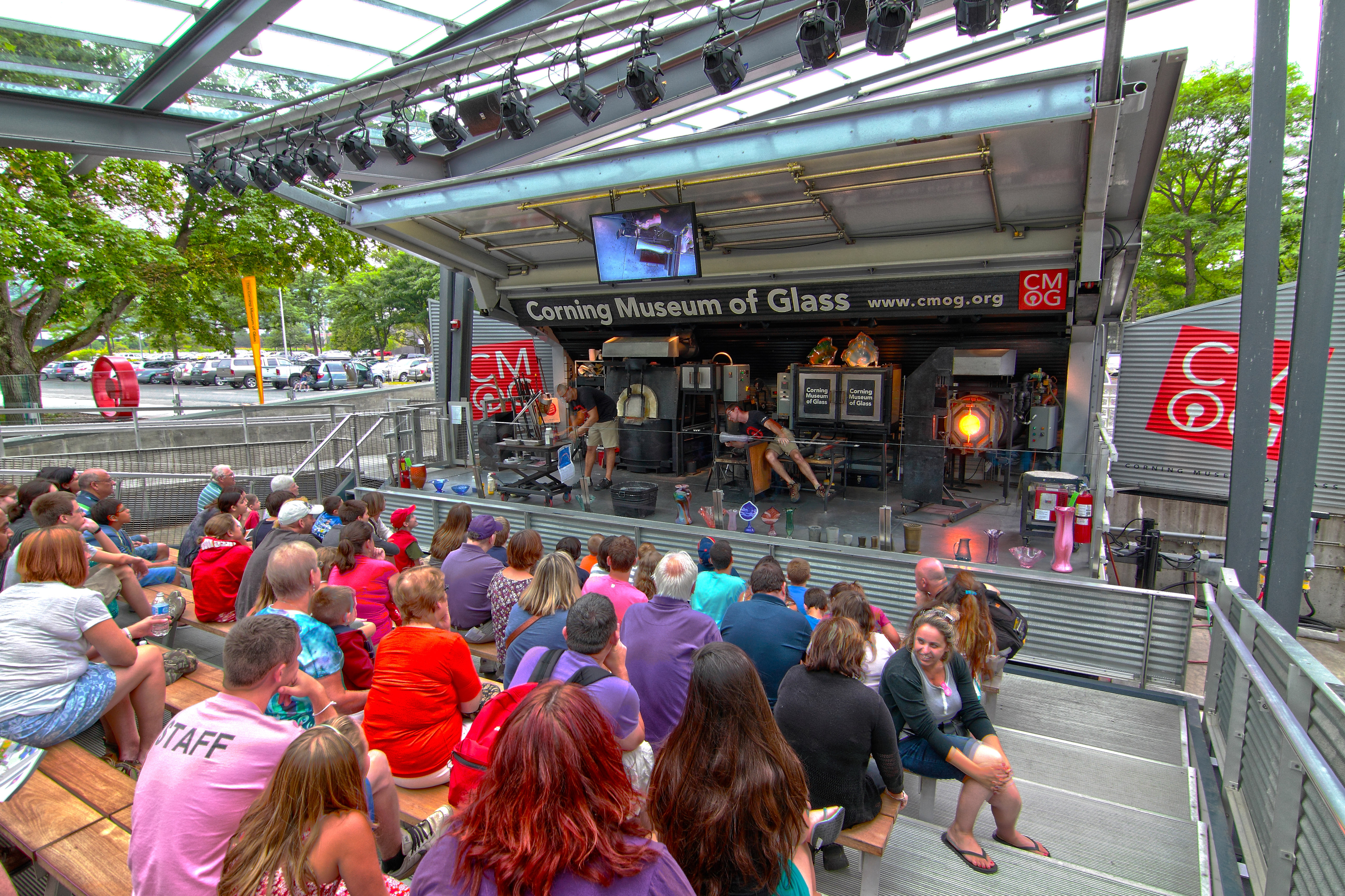
A live outdoor hot glass show in 2011

The museum actively researches, publishes, and provides lectures about a range of glass topics. It hosts The Rakow Research Library, which houses a collection of materials on the art and history of glass and glassmaking, and is open to the public.

=== Rakow Research Library ===
The Rakow Research Library, founded as part of the CMoG in 1951, is a public institution that houses a comprehensive collection of materials on the art and history of glass and glassmaking. The library collection ranges from medieval manuscripts to original works of art on paper to the latest information on techniques used by studio artists. More than 130 archives contain unique material from individual artists, galleries, companies, scholars, and organizations. The library also presents exhibitions featuring rare items from its collection. In 1985, the museum renamed its library the Leonard S. and Juliette K. Rakow Library in honor of donors Dr. and Mrs. Rakow. The collection does not circulate. However, the library is a member of the Online Computer Library Center (OCLC), an international bibliographic service, and microfiche copies of books on glass and photocopies of periodical articles can be borrowed through interlibrary loan.

== In popular culture ==
The Canadian reality glassblowing competition television series Blown Away includes an artist residency at the CMOG as part of its prize. The museum also provided assistance during the series' production.
