= Jean-Pierre Weill =

American artist

Jean-Pierre Weill is an artist and author.

== Biography ==
=== Early life ===
Born in Paris, France, in 1954, Jean-Pierre was one of four children born to Luce Weill and Arthur Klein. Early in his life, Weill's family moved from Paris to New York. When Weill finished high school in 1972 he enrolled in St. John's College to study the classics.

=== Personal life ===
In 1983, Weill married fellow artist Rachel Rotenberg. Together the couple had five children (Elisha, Davida, Yadin, Nadav, and Safira) . In 2014, Weill and Rotenberg moved to Israel, following their two eldest children, who were starting young families. Their first step upon moving was to build studios attached to their new home.

== Career ==
=== Spoken Arts, Inc. ===
After graduating from St.John's, Weill joined Spoken Arts Inc., a family recording company with the goal of producing an audio library of leading 20th Century writers and poets reciting their own works.

=== 3D Painting on Glass, Vitreography (art form) ===
While experimenting in the visual arts, Weill developed a distinct medium to compose and present paintings through a series of images drawn on glass panes and suspended within a shadow box frame. Weill termed his method vitreography and trademarked the term in 1992. Weill founded Jean-Pierre Weill Studios, where he created his 3D paintings on multiple levels of glass. He developed multiple lines of artwork in this style, grouped by dimensions, price, and edition size. His paintings offer both the artist and the viewer an additional axis of expression and interpretation through 3-dimensional space. Weill's artwork has been well-received, selling in hundreds of galleries. In 2014, when Weill moved to Israel, his two daughters, Davida and Safira, joined his studio, bringing new perspectives to his unique line of artwork.

=== The Well of Being: a children's book for adults ===
Weill wrote and self-published his first book in 2012. Titled, The Well of Being: a children's book for adults, the book explores the relationship between self-perception and life-perception through simple words and fanciful illustrations. The book received notable endorsement from Ram Dass and a favorable review from Kirkus Reviews, the latter having included it in a short list of "Best Indie Books of 2013 to Help Enhance Your Life." After receiving a very positive review on brainpickings, rights to the book were purchased by MacMillan International Publishers (UK) and Flatiron Publishers (USA). Weill is currently writing a sequel.
