= Apollo 18: The Moon Missions =

1999 simulation game

- Developer: AIM Software
- Publisher: Project Two Interactive

Apollo 18: The Moon Missions is a simulation video game developed by American studio AIM Software and published by Project Two Interactive on March 31, 1999, for Windows.

The game takes place on two disks: a video-heavy tutorial disk, and the simulation training at Johnson Space Center. Players learn proper commands and sequence, and then apply this to the Apollo 18 to ensure a successful launch.

While the Apollo 18 is fictitious, the game is based on the real events that led to the 1969 Moon landing.

== Reception ==
IGN felt that the game ultimately left feelings of boredom and frustration. Gamesmania gave the title a rating of 20% while PC Joker gave it 19%. GamePro criticised the Spartan 200 page manual.
