= American craft =

Craft work produced by independent studio artists

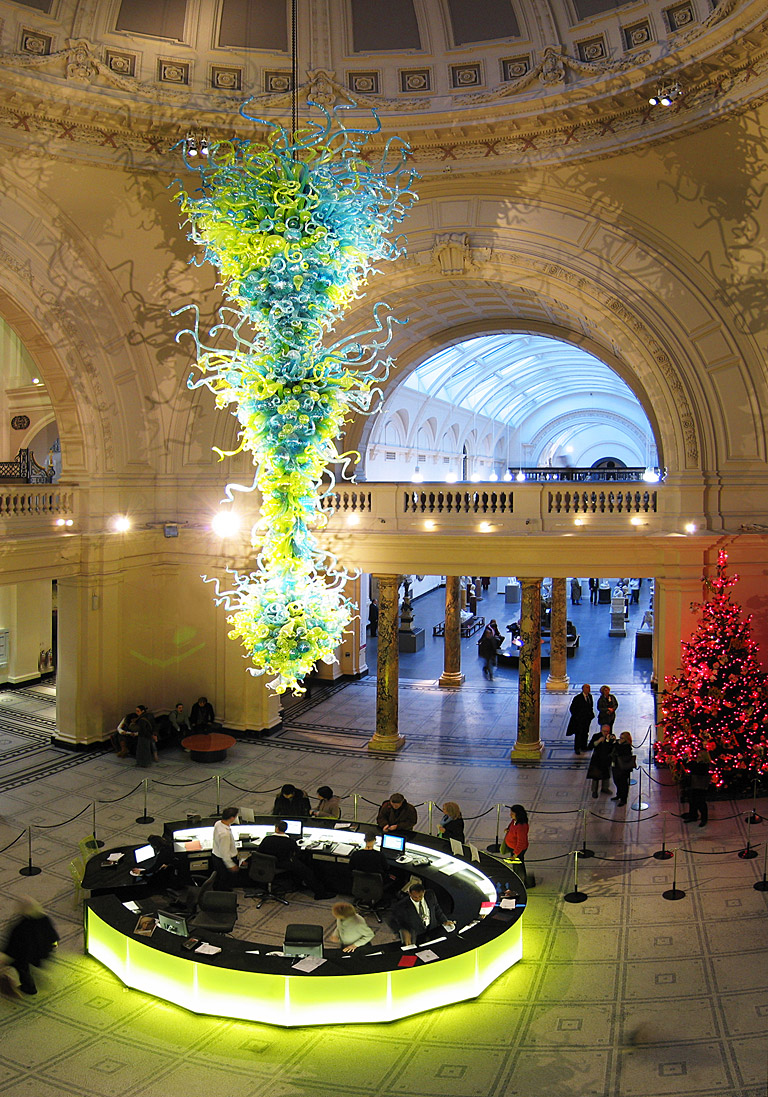
Dale Chihuly's 30-foot blown-glass chandelier in the Victoria and Albert Museum in 2000

American craft is craft work produced by independent studio artists working with traditional craft materials and processes. Examples include wood (woodworking and furniture making), glass (glassblowing and lampworking), clay (ceramics), textiles, and metal (metalworking). Studio craft works tend to either serve or allude to a functional or utilitarian purpose, although they are just as often handled and exhibited in ways similar to visual art objects.

== History ==
The American studio craft movement is a successor to earlier European craft movements. Modern studio crafts developed as a reaction to modernity and, particularly, the Industrial Revolution. During the nineteenth century, Scottish historian Thomas Carlyle and English social critic John Ruskin warned of the extinction of handicrafts in Europe. English designer and theorist William Morris continued this line of thought, becoming father of England's Arts & Crafts Movement. Morris distinguished the studio craftsman in this way: "[O]ur art is the work of a small minority composed of educated persons, fully conscious of their aim of producing beauty, and distinguished from the great body of workmen by that aim." Both European and American craft traditions have also been influenced by Art Nouveau. Both of these movements influenced the development of the contemporary studio craft movement in the United States during the late nineteenth century, throughout the twentieth century and to the present.

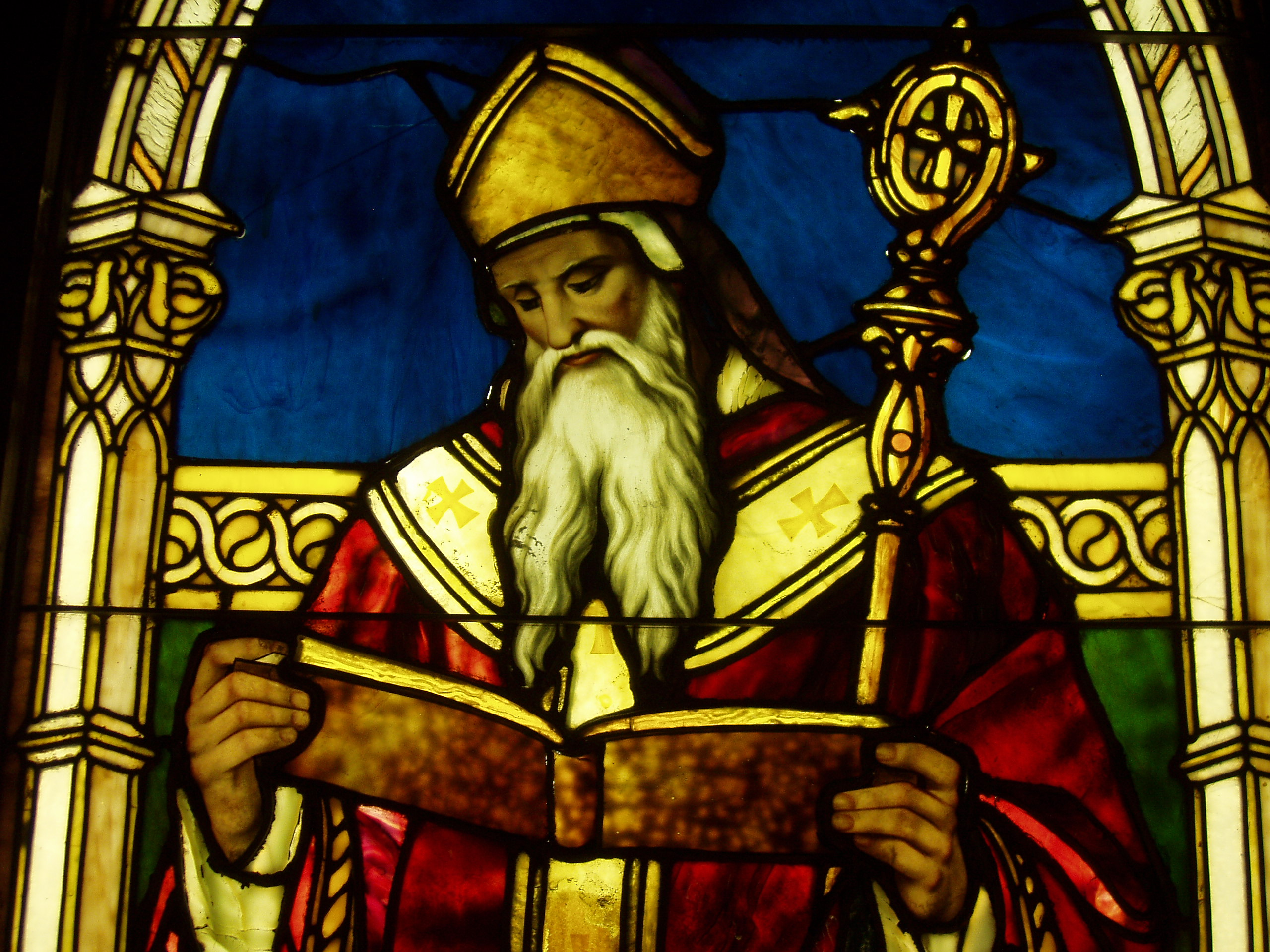
Window of St. Augustine; by Louis Comfort Tiffany, now in the Lightner Museum, St. Augustine, Florida

== American craft pioneers ==
In the early nineteenth century it became popular for rural Americans of modest means to take the decoration of their homes and furniture into their own hands. The artist Rufus Porter was an early proponent of the American craft movement. In 1825 he published A Select Collection of Valuable and Curious Arts, and Interesting Experiments Which are Well Explained, and Warranted Genuine, and May be Prepared, Safely and at Little Expense, which is a book of instructions for domestic decorative arts, including wall, floor, and furniture painting.

By the end of the nineteenth century, the preindustrial craft trades had almost disappeared. Industrial expansion and westward movement had largely severed American culture from early Colonial American and Native American craft roots. Against this backdrop, Louis Comfort Tiffany was a pioneer of the American craft movement, arguing for the placement of well-designed and crafted objects in the American home. Tiffany's elegant stained glass creations were influenced by the values of William Morris and became America's leading embodiment of Art Nouveau.

Gustav Stickley, the cabinetmaker, was an early leader in the development of Studio Furniture and the American craft movement. Stickley's designs were distinguished by their simplicity and by their harmony between interior decorative art and architecture. Stickley's magazine, "The Craftsman," was a forum for this movement from 1901 through 1916. Originally focused on expounding ideas from the England's Arts and Crafts Movement, "The Craftsman" increasingly developed American craft concepts over the years of its publication. Stickley's ideas later had influence on Frank Lloyd Wright and future generations of American craftsmen, artists and architects.

The Roycroft movement was an American adaptation of the British arts and crafts movement founded by Elbert Hubbard and his wife Bertha Crawford Hubbard in the small-town of East Aurora, New York in 1895. Its focus was on writing and publishing ornate books, but it also made furniture and metal products. Roycroft was organized as a living/working artisans' community along the lines of a Medieval European guild.

== Early craft institutions ==
The studio crafts movement was fostered by the establishment of crafts programs within post-secondary educational institutions. In 1894, for example, North America's first university ceramics department was begun at Ohio State University in Columbus, Ohio. This was followed in 1901 by the establishment of the first ceramics art school at Alfred University in Alfred, New York. Similarly, the Rhode Island School of Design in Providence, Rhode Island established the first metal arts class in 1901 and the first textiles class in 1903.

After World War I, a postwar spirit of internationalism influenced the establishment of other important craft institutions, such as the Cranbrook Academy of Art in Bloomfield Hills, Michigan. Cranbrook craftsmen translated organic and geometric forms into the style that would be known as Art Deco. At Cranbrook, teachers like Maija Grotell produced important work in their own right while also teaching a new generation of young studio craft artists such as Mary Kring Risley.

== The Depression years and World War II ==
During the Depression years, the federal Works Progress Administration funded crafts projects as well as public works and murals as a way to both keep workers working and as a way to increase national morale. This enabled crafts to flourish at a local level. At the same time, American art programs began to include craft studies into their curricula.

World War II brought an influx of European artists and craftsmen. These European exiles brought with them a range of historical traditions including not only European craft practices but also knowledge of Asian and other non-Western cultures. One example of this influx is Tage Frid, a Danish furniture maker, who established the reputation of the Furniture Making program at Rhode Island School of Design, and there are certainly others. Also during the post World War II period a general dissatisfaction with industrial society began to fuel further support for handmade art objects. In 1943, the American Craft Council was founded to support craftspeople and cultivate an appreciation for their work. The ACC's founder, Aileen Osborn Webb was a potter interested in creating marketing opportunities for studio craftsmen. The organization eventually grew to include American Craft magazine and the Museum of Arts and Design (then called the Museum of Contemporary Crafts and at one point known as the American Craft Museum). As a result of these phenomena, post-war American craft became stylistically more refined as well as technically more proficient.

== The 1950s and Peter Voulkos ==
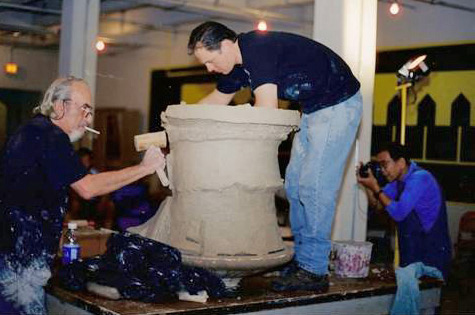
Peter Voulkos (left) assisted by John Balistreri.

During the 1950s, some artists turned to the truth-to-materials doctrine. This movement entailed an emphasis on the collective production of crafts work. Craftsmen sometimes worked together during this period to develop more ambitious projects. Throughout the 1950s and afterwards, potter Peter Voulkos developed increasingly largescale and nontraditional ceramic works, influenced by Abstract Expressionism, which transformed traditional understandings of the craft media. Like the Abstract Expressionists, Voulkos emphasized performance, process and primal expression in his ceramic forms. In some cases, Voulkos deconstructed and reconstructed traditional ceramic vessel forms such as plates, ice buckets, and tea bowls. In other works, Voulkos created new nonutilitarian forms, such as his purely sculptural, large-scale cylindrical "stacks."

Voulkos was also influenced by Zen Buddhism after a 1952 encounter with Japanese potter Shoji Hamada. Hamada encouraged Voulkos to embrace a Zen approach to ceramics based not only upon technical proficiency but also upon a mental and spiritual union between creator and art object. Voulkos later cited Hamada's statement that it "took him ten years to learn the potter's wheel and another ten years to forget it"—an insight that inspired Voulkos' early attempts to fully form a teapot in two minutes.

Voulkos taught at Black Mountain College in 1953, where he was further exposed to the avant-garde movements. In 1954, he founded the ceramics department at the Otis College of Art and Design (then called the Los Angeles County Art Institute). In California, Voulkos' pottery rapidly became abstract and sculptural. Voulkos then moved to the University of California, Berkeley, where he founded another ceramics department and taught from 1959 until 1985. At Berkeley, Voulkos became increasingly prominent for his massive, cracked and slashed pots.

== The 1960s and the new glassblowing movement ==
The culture of the 1960s was even more conducive to the development of studio crafts. This period saw a rejection of materialism and exploration of alternative ways of living. For some, the creation of handicrafts provided just such an outlet. In 1962, then-ceramics professor Harvey Littleton and chemist Dominick Labino began the contemporary glassblowing movement. The impetus for the movement consisted of their two workshops at the Toledo Museum of Art, during which they began experimenting with melting glass in a small furnace and creating blown glass art. Thus Littleton and Labino were the first to make molten glass feasible for artists in private studios. Harvey Littleton extended his influence through his own important artistic contributions and through his teaching. Over the years, Harvey Littleton trained many of the most important contemporary glass artists, including Marvin Lipofsky, Sam Herman (Britain), Fritz Dreisbach and Dale Chihuly. These Littleton students in turn developed the new movement and spread it across the country. Marvin Lipofsky, for example, is credited with being one of the founders of the Glass Art Society and introducing studio glass to California. In 1967, Lipofsky founded the glass program at the California College of Arts and Crafts, which he headed for two decades.

In 1971, Dale Chihuly and Ruth Tamura began the influential Pilchuck Glass School near the rural town of Stanwood, Washington, financially supported by John and Anne Hauberg who supported the idea for a glass-blowing summer school program in the rural Northwest. The subsequent development of this program became the Pilchuck Glass School. Influenced by the Haystack Mountain School of Crafts (the first school to have a glass furnace), and the Penland School of Crafts, Pilchuck Glass School has become a center of the contemporary American studio glass movement, of which Chihuly is a leading figure. Artist Toots Zynsky, a Pilchuck pioneer, observed that the choice of a Western location for the school reflected a conscious rejection of the Eastern art establishment. The naming of the school also reflected the founders' countercultural attraction to Native American culture. Chihuly chose the name "Pilchuck," derived from the Chinookan words for "red" and "water," alluding to the iron-rich waters of the nearby Pilchuck River.

== The Renwick Gallery ==
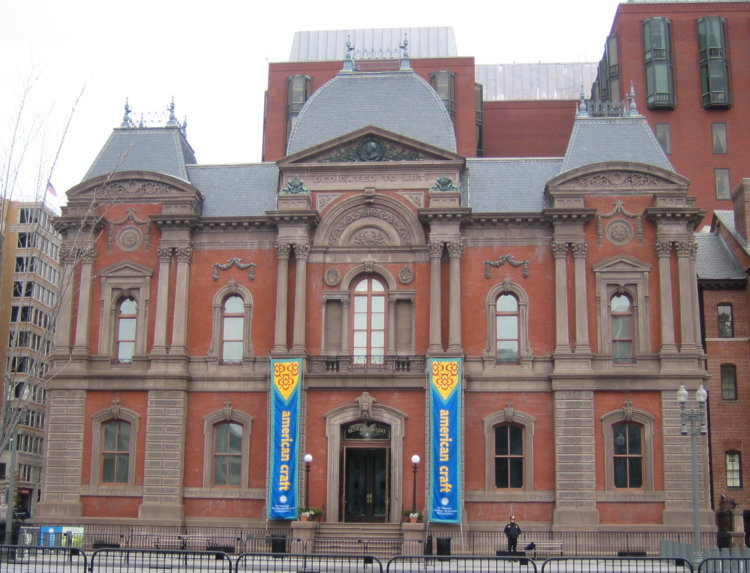
The Renwick Gallery, at the Smithsonian

In 1972, the Smithsonian Institution's Renwick Gallery was founded as a studio craft department of the Smithsonian American Art Museum. Housed in the original Corcoran Gallery of Art building across Pennsylvania Avenue from the White House, it provided a distinguished setting for American studio craft objects in Washington, D.C.

== The Year of American Craft ==
In 1992, President George H. W. Bush signed a proclamation designating 1993 as The Year of American Craft. As part of this commemoration, Renwick Gallery director Michael Monroe selected seventy-two works by seventy American craftsmen which were donated to the White House to serve as The White House Collection of American Crafts. This collection was displayed for four months at the National Museum of American Art in 1995.

== Types ==
- American Craftsman
- American Fancy
- Appalachian Spring (store)
- Applied art
- Art Nouveau
- Art quilts
- Art Deco
- Arts and crafts
- Blacksmithing
- Ceramics
- Craft
- Decorative arts
- Fiber art
- Glass art
- Glass blowing
- Handicraft
- Mosaic
- Quilt
- Studio craft
- Studio Furniture
- Studio pottery
- Woodturning

== Sources ==
- Biography.com Peter Voulkos Biography (1924–2002) (Retrieved 2007-09-01)
- Timothy Anglin Burgard, The Art of Craft: Contemporary Works from the Saxe Collection. Fine Arts Museums of San Francisco, 1999. ISBN 0-88401-098-8 (paperback). ISBN 0-8212-2637-1 (hardcover).
- Barbaralee Diamonstein, "Values, Skills and Dreams: Crafts in America", in Michael Monroe, The White House Collection of American Crafts, Harry N. Abrams, Inc. 1995. ISBN 0-8109-4035-3.
- Julie Hall, Tradition and Change: The New American Craftsman, E.P. Dutton, 1977. ISBN 0-525-22195-6.
- Kenneth Trapp and Howard Risatti, Skilled Work: American Craft in the Renwick Gallery. Smithsonian Institution Press, 1998. ISBN 1-56098-806-1
- Pohl, Francis K. Framing America. A Social History of American Art. New York: Thames and Hudson, 2002 (pages 118–122)
