= The Well of Being =

Book by Jean-Pierre Weill

First edition

The Well of Being: a children's book for adults is artist Jean-Pierre Weill's first book and a pioneering endeavor to bring a child's perspective to serious adult literature. The book combines the gravity of adult issues such as the pursuit of well-being and self-actualization with the levity of a picture book and the disinhibition of a child.

== Origins ==
According to the author, "The Well of Being is a pictorial narrative and my first book. The book took a few turns before I learned where it was headed. I thought I was writing a pictorial adventure about T. S. Eliot’s famous Love Song of J. Alfred Prufrock. I had drawn illustrations of Mr. Prufrock muttering tedious arguments to himself as he visited a museum or walked along muddled half deserted streets. I cataloged his (and my) dark moods - his confusion and longings and ennui, and his states of victimhood. I then decided to expand the repertoire of watercolors to include my positive states of mind, my moments of contentment and joy. Traces of Eliot’s poem all but disappeared as I discovered the book’s true purpose: to guide modernist Everyman - and along with him, myself - to the wellbeing he longs for, dimly remembers yet no longer believes in."

== Plot ==
The story is a running duality, exploring the formations of universal order and of individual identity. The story told is at once personal and universal, literal and allegorical. Commenting on this duality, Kirkus Reviews notes that "readers may feel encouraged to read their own life experiences into these stark images, using Weill’s paintings like spiritual Rorschach blots. What wisdom or reassurance they draw from such an exercise will depend on what they put into it." Spiritual themes and religious myths are creatively interlaid with the plot to give the book a distinct historico-cultural dimension. The story may be seen as much as a modern retelling of human history and tradition as it is an argument for its reconditioning.

Starting with the first cause and moving to the Big Bang, the book covers evolution before settling on its primary subjects of human psychology, fortune, and freewill. These subjects are explored through stories and reflections from the author's own life. The plot picks up in the Garden of Eden, a symbol of childhood security and well-being from which we are all eventually evicted. This is where the reader is introduced to the protagonist, a faceless man revisiting his original sin, his childhood fall from grace that proved to be an enduringly formative experience. The story around which the rest of the book pivots is that of the faceless little boy who, taken by a fit of creative expression, decides to adorn his bedroom wall with a scenic mural. After completing the painting, the boy waits with pride for his mother's surprise and adulation. Instead of approval the boy's creation is met with fury. This, the reader learns, is when the protagonist first perceived that he was flawed and inadequate; deep within him, it seemed, laid mischief and wrong thinking.

The focus of the book then shifts back to the fully grown faceless man and his struggle for emotional homeostasis and well-being. Ever since that childhood experience, the faceless man tried to contain his inadequacy, scheming to present himself in different ways to mask his fundamental deficits. This scheming resulted in a convolution of associative thought-processes and value symbols. It is these sorts of associations, expounds The Well of Being, that all people carry with them that extensively govern human psychology, implanting themselves as unshakeable truisms in the minds of their hosts. And, continues the book's narrative, human psychology plays no small part in determining the course and perception of human fortune.

In this way, the plot of The Well of Being may be seen as a pragmatic, if not philosophical, affirmation and advocacy of human freewill.

== Publication ==
After pursuing publication through mainstream publishing houses since 2010, Weill found that he was unwilling to cede the creative control demanded by his suitors. Determined to proceed, Weill took to the internet to raise funding for a self-publication. In October 2013, Weill's Kickstarter campaign concluded after having surpassed its fundraising goal of $6,500. The Well of Being: a children's book for adults went to print and began selling shortly thereafter.

== Reception ==
The Well of Being received endorsements from Ram Dass, Daniel Goleman, and Cynthia Ozick, as well as the Baltimore Fishbowl. With Goleman commenting that "Jean-Pierre Weill speaks straight to the heart in a voice at once profound and provocative. Weill's creative genius shines - as writer, artist and thinker. Everyone should read this book - it's a mind changer." Additionally, The Well of Being received favorable reviews from Kirkus Reviews and the Baltimore Jewish Times. The former calling the book "a beautifully crafted, uplifting meditation on the inner, personal dimensions of hope", and the Baltimore Jewish Times declaring that "[The Well of Being] merits a place of honor in the waiting room of every therapist’s office, in yoga studios, at meditation centers and on bookshelves in homes everywhere. And in every place where those of us who are no longer children seek comfort, insight, faith and meaning."
