= Mary Kring Risley =

American ceramicist (1926–2000)

- Born: 4 July 1926
- Died: 13 January 2000 (aged 73); Middletown
- Alma mater: Cranbrook Academy of Art; University of Michigan
- Occupation: Potter, ceramist, writer
- Employer: Wesleyan Potters (1953–); Federal Government of the United States; Haystack Mountain School of Crafts; Wesleyan University
- Spouse(s): John Risley

Mary Kring Risley (July 4, 1926 – January 13, 2000) was an American ceramicist. She published The ceramic industry in the Philippines (1954) based on her work in the Philippines with the Foreign Service. After returning to the United States, Risley became a leading figure in the Wesleyan Potters Guild, teaching there and at Wesleyan University. She and her husband John Risley were influential in the postwar American craft movement, which emphasized both the functional and artistic qualities of objects.

== Early life and education ==
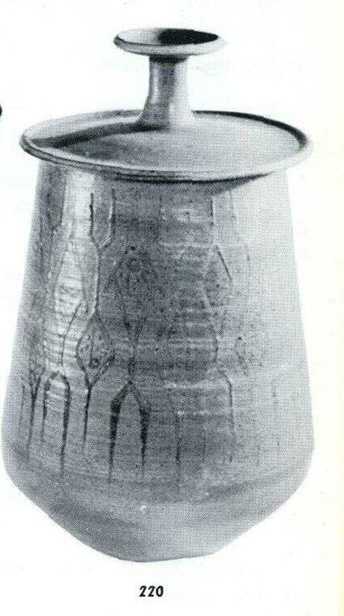
Mary Kring Risley, "Jar", from Craftsmanship in a Changing World (1956)

Mary Kring earned a B.A. in Drawing and Painting from the University of Michigan in 1948. She then attended Cranbrook Academy of Art in Bloomfield Hills, Michigan. There she met her future husband, artist John Risley. They married in 1951, the same week that Mary Kring graduated from Cranbrook with her MFA in Ceramics.

== Career ==
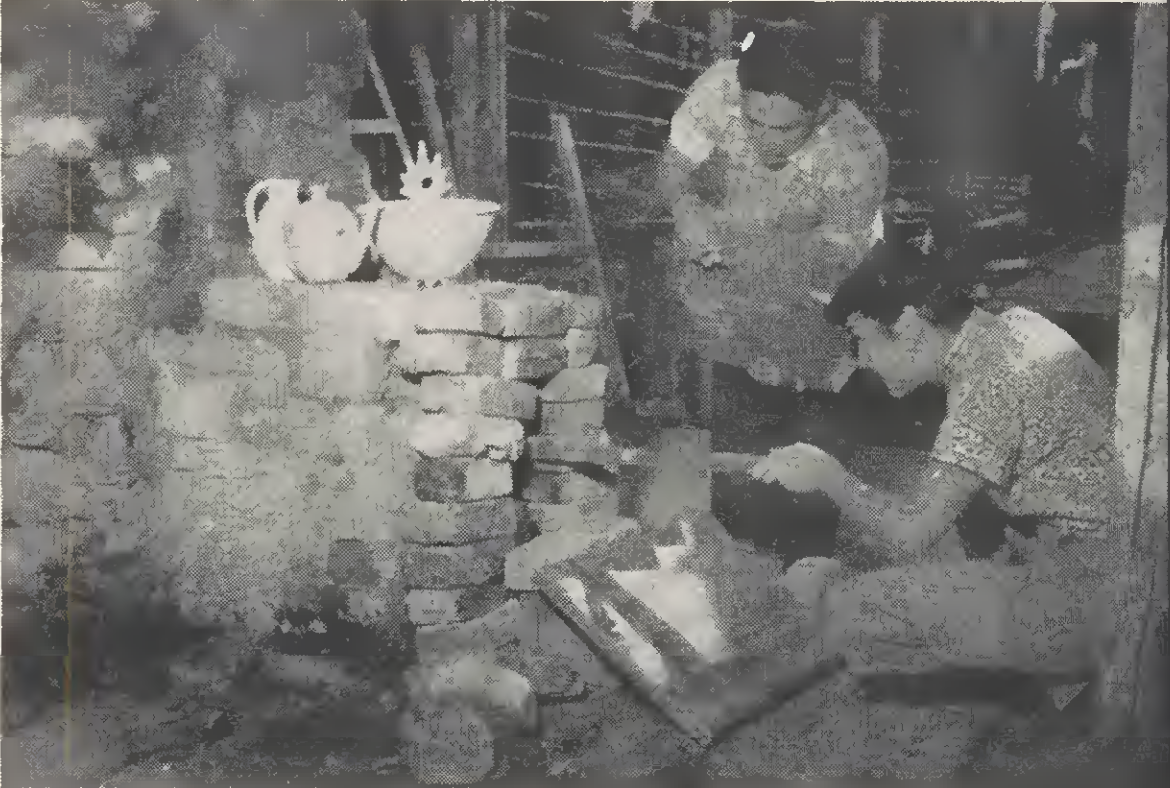
Mary Kring Risley (right) firing pottery in the Philippines

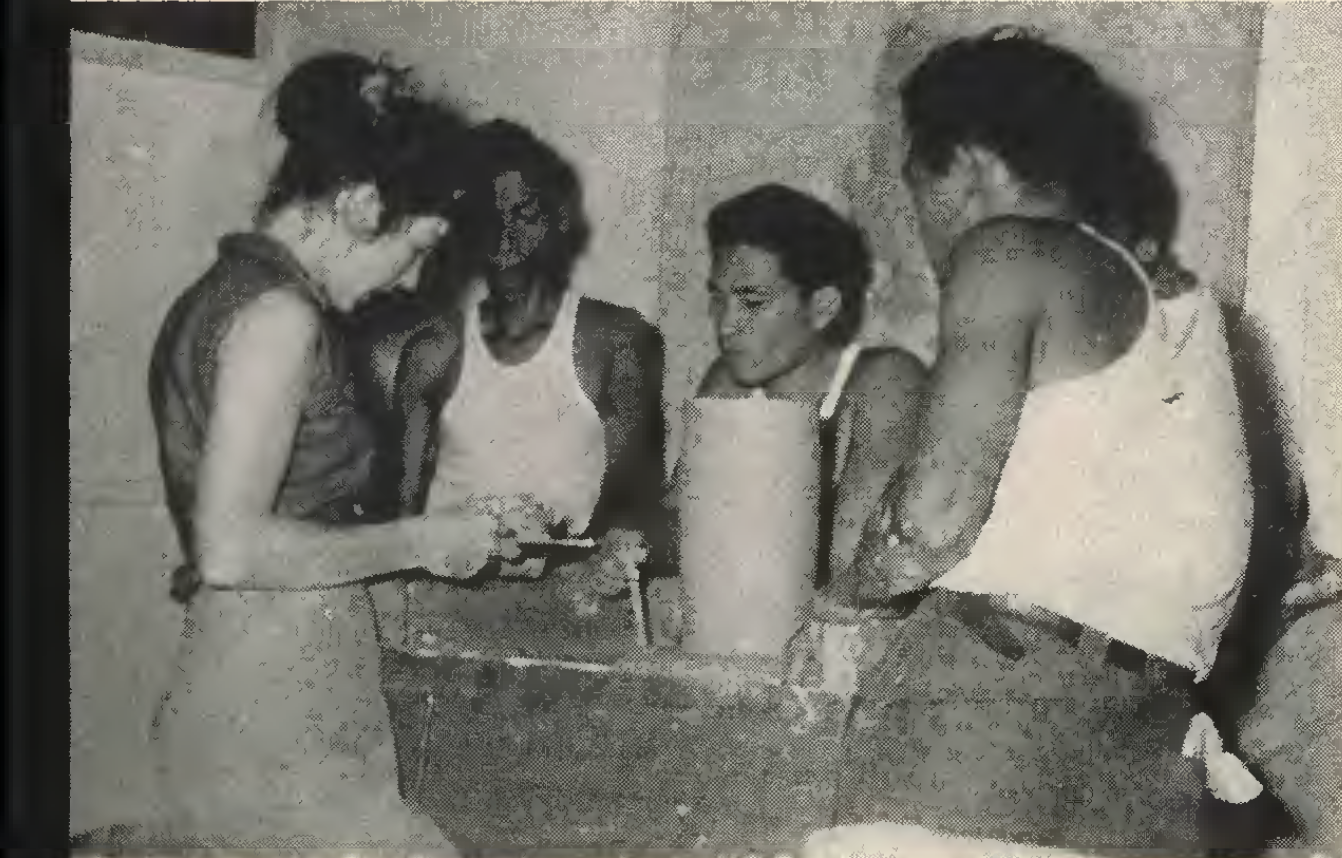
Mary Kring Risley (left) with trainees at the Philippine Government pottery shop

For their honeymoon, the Risleys went to the Philippines on a three-year placement with the Foreign Service. This project also included Cranbrook textile designers Lysbeth Mai Wallace and Marianne Strengell, and furniture designer Olav Hammarstrom. The Risleys worked for the State Department in the Philippines and later in Taiwan, connecting local craft industries with contemporary design.

In 1952, Mary Kring Risley was appointed by the United Nations Technical Assistance Program to work with the Government of the Philippines as a ceramics expert on a ten-month project. Goals of this project included expansion of small-scale potteries, improvement of equipment, a trainee program, and the development of clays and glazes. Based on her work, she published The ceramic industry in the Philippines (1954).

After returning to the United States, the Risleys settled in Middletown, Connecticut. There they rebuilt and furnished a house in which almost everything was handmade. John Risley taught at Wesleyan University from 1954 to 1988.

Mary Kring Risley was key in establishing the Wesleyan Potters Guild, a craft school and non-profit cooperative guild in Middletown Connecticut. She became the instructor at Wesleyan Potters in 1953. She was also an instructor at the Haystack Mountain School of Crafts in 1953.

"Since ideas are always at the mercy of the process, technique is a necessary involvement and a pleasurable challenge. This interest in method has guided me in my work in ceramics and has led me to experiment in other media, but it is with clay and its surfaces that I feel most comfortable."- Mary Kring Risley

Mary Kring Risley was an adjunct associate professor of art at Wesleyan University. Wesleyan University lists an extensive collection of the theses and dissertations of students who Mary Kring Risley advised.

== Publications ==
- Risley, Mary Kring (1954). The ceramic industry in the Philippines. New York: United Nations Technical Assistance Program.
