= Appalachian Spring (store) =

Store in Washington D.C.

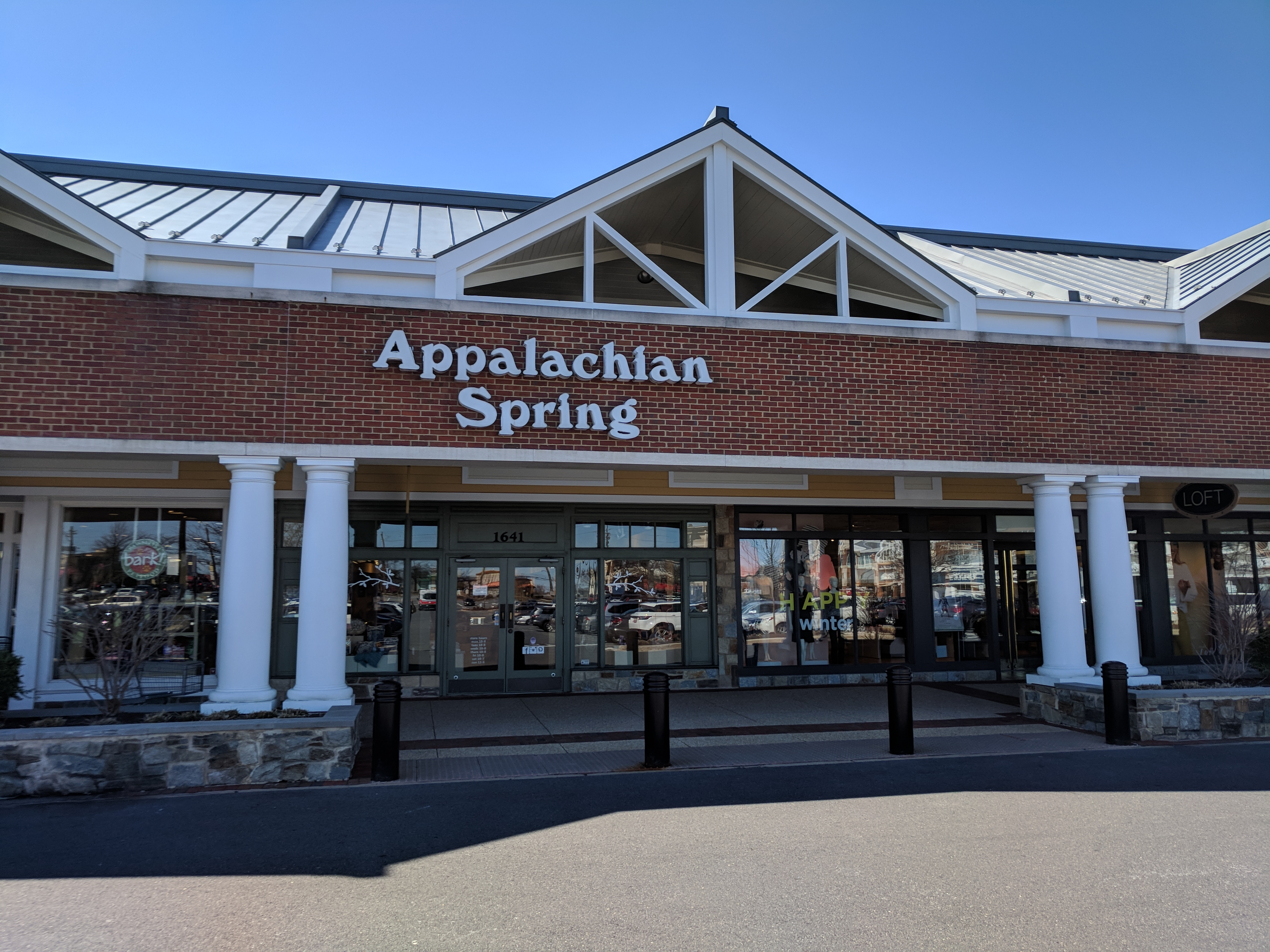
Appalachian Spring store in Rockville, Maryland, March 2018.

Appalachian Spring was originally a retail company founded in 1968 by David and Paula Brooks in the Georgetown section of Washington, D.C., United States. David and Paula Brooks began with the goal of bringing to the community a collection of American craft. To find the products they looked to the artists and craftspeople that lived and worked in the Appalachian states of the United States, the region in which they had grown up. While most of the work is made in the United States, Appalachian Spring has added the work of craftspeople from other parts of the world.

At their peak, Appalachian Spring had five retail stores in the Washington, DC and Richmond, Virginia areas, as well as a retail website.

However, the founders retired after 50 years and as of November 2018, all but one store in Rockville, Maryland closed down.

David and Paula Brooks are founding members of the Craft Retailers Association for Tomorrow, David is chairman and Paula is a member of the Business Practices Committee.

== Awards ==
Appalachian Spring was voted Top Retailer Of American Craft for two consecutive years, 1995 and 1996 by Niche Magazine and craft exhibitors at the Philadelphia Buyers Market of American Craft and the Baltimore American Craft Council shows. After winning two years in a row a Hall of Fame was created and Appalachian Spring was inducted as the first Gallery of Honor members.
