= Toots Zynsky =

American glass artist

- Born: Mary Ann Zynsky; 1951 (age 74–75)
- Education: Rhode Island School of Design
- Style: glass art

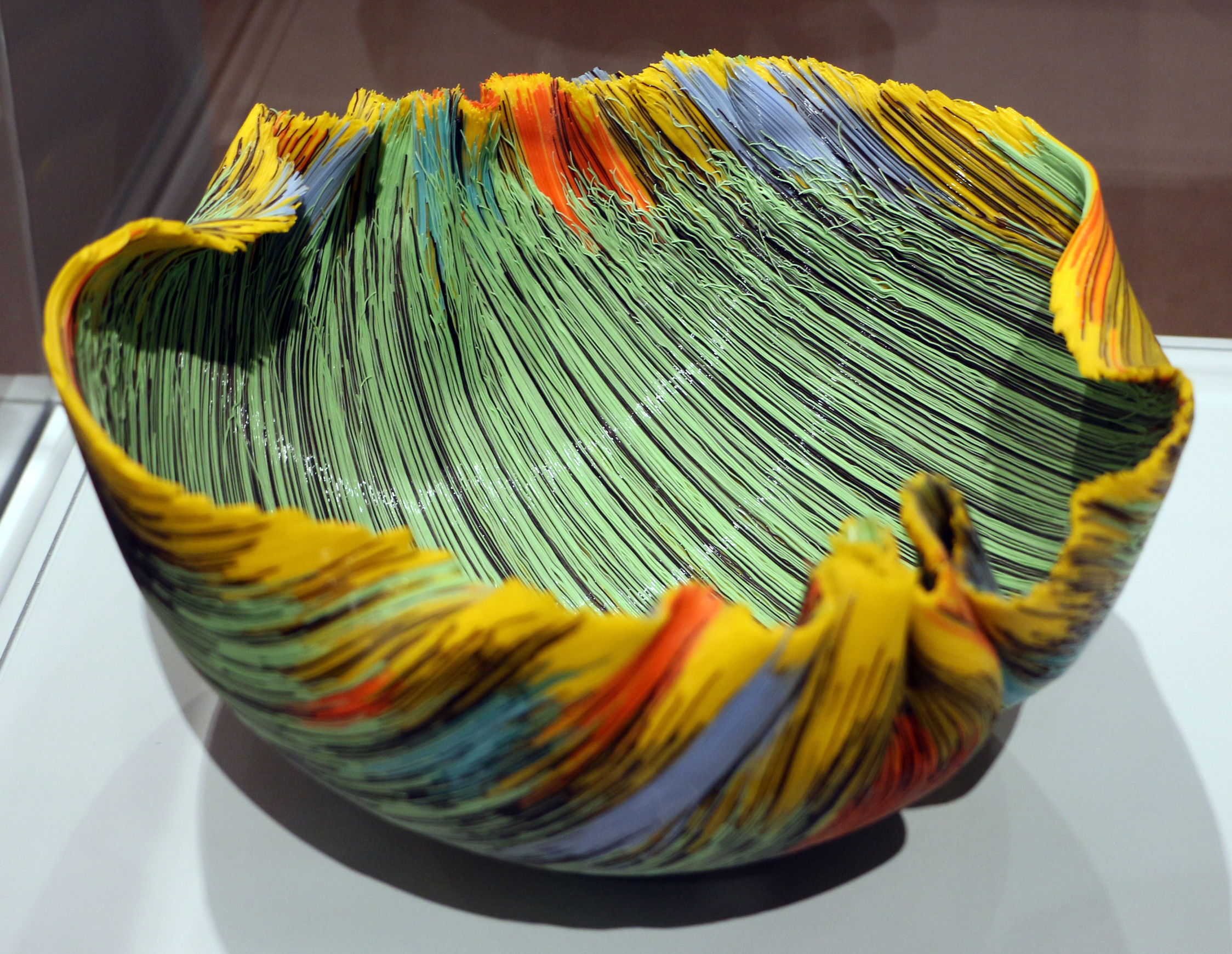
Bird of Paradise, 1987, in the Speed Art Museum

Mary Ann Zynsky, better known as Toots Zynsky is an American glass artist. Zynsky developed the filet-de-verre technique of glass sculpture.

== Early life ==
A native of Boston, Zynsky was known as "Toots" almost from the time she was born. She studied at the Rhode Island School of Design, receiving her BFA before traveling to Seattle to work at the Pilchuck Glass School under Dale Chihuly; she has continued to return there as an instructor. In 1970, She spent six months in the 1980s in Ghana researching the local music.

Over a sixteen-year period, Zynsky lived in the Netherlands, Ghana, France, and Italy.

== Career ==
Zynsky's work is known for featuring the filet-de-verre technique, which she pioneered, in which fine threads are pulled from glass canes. It is unlcear whether she began using this technique in 1982 while working at the New York Experimental Glass Workshop (now UrbanGlass) or during her time in Europe shortly after. The FiberArts Journal described the process of Zynsky's filet-de-verre technique:

To make the threads, Zynsky pulls heated glass canes into fibers as thin as hair. Using the threads as her palette, she builds them into layers. After heating the fibers to fuse them, she places the piece over a mold. In the final step, Zynsky squeezes and forms the vessel into its distinct shape. When completed, the vessels have a rough edge and textured surface that shows the original threads, much like looking at a fine warp-faced fabric.

In an interview, Zynsky said she "[uses] the glass thread in a way like a drawing or a painting. It's a very similar thought process to me." When discussing her inspiration, Zynsky cited her love of dance and music, saying, "when I hear music it translates to color for me."

Zynsky has shown her work at exhibitions worldwide. In 1988, she was awarded the Rakow Commission for work added to The Corning Museum of Glass. She designed the torch, in the shape of a prosthetic limb, for the 2002 Paralympic Winter Games. She was a resident artist at the Corning Museum of Glass in 2016. In 2008, she was named to the American Craft Council College of Fellows.

Her work is included in the collections of the Smithsonian American Art Museum and the Seattle Art Museum.

== Honors and awards ==
- 2016,The Corning Museum of Glass and Corning Incorporated Specialty Glass Artists-in-Residence
- 2015, Smithsonian Institution Visionary Award
- 1988, Rakow Commission, Corning Museum of Glass, U.S.A.
