= Vitreography (art form) =

As an art form, vitreography is a style of contained 3-dimensional scenes displayed in a shadow box frame.

== Process and effect ==
Elements of the scene are isolated and drawn/painted on separate, suspended glass panes. The elements merge in the shadow box frame, utilizing the glass' transparency, to give a layered dimensionality to the scene and its components. Depending on the angle of perception, background, ground, and foreground will all interact differently. Through this method the artist is given a new axis of expression with which to experiment and engage an audience. In this way, vitreography may be seen as the fine art rendition of the Ken Burns effect, giving new dimension and life to still images.

== Origins ==
Both the particular art form and the application of the term "vitreography" were pioneered by the French-American artist Jean-Pierre Weill, Weill having trademarked the word in 1992. Painting on successive glass panes to add real-world dimension to a depiction is seen by some as the natural bridge between the arts of sculpting and painting. What distinguishes vitreography from other stacked glass pane paintings is that each level of a vitreography largely maintains its independence, creating scenes within a larger scene rather than a singular amalgamation.

== Vitreography today ==
Vitreography remains a fringe art form, as few artists experiment with the technique. Nonetheless, Weill has earned acclaim for his vitreographs, which sell for thousands of dollars.
