= Rachel Rotenberg =

American sculptor (born 1958)

Rachel Rotenberg (born 1958) is a Canadian-born sculptor.

== Family life ==
Rotenberg was born and raised in Ontario, Canada. After residing in different cities in the USA like Baltimore and Brooklyn, she immigrated to Israel in 2015.

== Education ==
Rotenberg attended the School of Visual Arts, in New York, and York University, in Toronto where she received a BFA in 1981.

== Career ==
Rotenberg has produced creative works since the early 1980s and is known for her wood sculptures made out of Canadian red Cedar lumber. She also works with concrete and metal.

Rotenberg was among the artists in included in the Guggenheim Fellowship of 2023, and has received two artist grants from the Pollock-Krasner Foundation. She earned the Creative Baltimore Individual Artist Award in 2009. In 2023, her works are slated for display at the American University Museum, backed by artist grants, including ones from the Canada Council for the Arts.

Museums where her work has been displayed include the Baltimore Museum of Art, the Delaware Art Museum, the McLean Project for the Arts, and the Museum on the Seam in Jerusalem.
