= American Fancy =

American Fancy was a decorative style popular in the United States between 1790 and 1840. Author Sumpter Priddy writes, American Fancy is a "cultural phenomenon born out of new and enlightened ways of seeing, understanding, and responding to the surrounding world. Fancy expressed itself in just about everything that pleased the senses; generally colorful and boldly patterned, it elicited delight, awe, surprise, whim, and caprice."

In the late 18th century, "fancy" was a synonym with "imagination," and America was developing a new fascination with the imaginative. The Fancy style began with "trifles," generally snuff boxes, fans, and combs made for women and consisted of whimsical patterns and bright colors.

Invented in the early 19th century, Kaleidoscopes inspired the creation of many textiles, furniture, and glass works in the American Fancy style.

American Fancy began to decline around the 1830s; with the invention of photography cultural interest shifted toward realism and away from the abstract patterns that defined American Fancy.
