= Tomé Fèteira =

Tomé Fèteira, S.A.
- Company type: Public company
- Industry: Manufacturing
- Founded: 1856 in Vieira de Leiria, Marinha Grande, Portugal
- Founder: Joaquim Tomé Fèteira
- Headquarters: Vieira de Leiria
- Products: Files and saw blades
- Website: http://www.tomefeteira.com

The Tomé Fèteira, S.A. is a Portuguese tool manufacturing company. It produces files, saw blades, bowsaws, handles, forging machines, and automatic cutting machines.

The company was founded in 1856 by Joaquim Tomé Fèteira, a metalworking craftsman from Vieira de Leiria in the Marinha Grande Municipality. Metalworking was already traditional in the region, providing tools for the timber industry connected to the nearby Pine Forest of Leiria.

After its founding, the production of the company soon exceeded the needs of the local timber industry, and the company started to sell products to the rest of Portugal. By early 20th century, the company had begun to export its products. In the 1940s, foreign sales accounted for 4/5 of its production.

The company was named PME Leader and PME Excellency in 2010 by IAPMEI.
