= European Glass Experience =

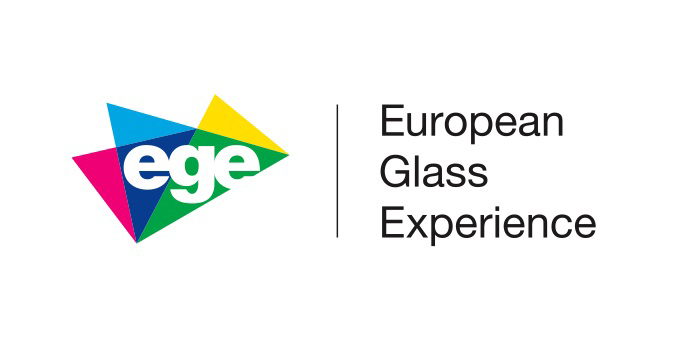
Logo of the projcet

European Glass Experience is a project coordinated by the City of Venice in collaboration with Consorzio Promovetro Murano and the Murano Glass Museum. It represents an international celebration of contemporary glass art and, most of all, of its makers.

== Project ==
EGE was officially launched on September 11, 2013 during a press conference at Ca' Farsetti in Venice, and its aim is to valorise the glass art on a European level, and to promote the works of local and international young artists. European Glass Experience was established to reinforce glass production and to improve the artistic heritage of traditional glass working experience. The project has among its partners The Finnish Glass Museum, Riihimäki, Finland, and the Fundación Centro Nacional del Vidrio, La Granja de San Idelfonso, Segovia, Spain. Associated partners are the Glass Factory in Boda Glasbruk, Sweden, the Muzeum Witrazu (Stained Glass Museum) in Kraków, the International Festival of Glass in Stourbridge, England and the Glass Museum of Marinha Grande (Portugal). European Glass Experience project is co-financed by a prestigious two-year grant from the Culture Program 2007–2013 of the European Union. The project will last two years, and it is composed by an exhibition which will take place in three different museums, divided into two sections: 40 unreleased glass artworks and 20 sketches which will become artworks, realised by Promovetro's Murano glass masters.

== The exhibition ==
The exhibition began at The Finnish Glass Museum, Riihimaki, Finland, in March 2014, curated by Uta Laurén, and then continued to the Fundación Centro Nacional del Vidrio, Spain, under the directorship of Paloma Pastor. The final venue will be the Murano Glass Museum, directed by Chiara Squarcina in March 2015. Further additional venues, among the associated partners, will possibly follow. European Glass Experience team panel, made of museum directors, curators, and glass experts, selected nearly 80 sketches and artworks, coming from young artists of different cultures. Murano Glass masters associated with Promovetro are going to realize a selection of the most peculiar sketches in glass.
