= Daniel Gildemeester =

18th-century Dutch trader in Portugal

- Born: 1714; Utrecht, Dutch Republic
- Died: 1793 (aged 78–79); Lisbon, Portugal
- Occupations: Merchant, diplomat
- Known for: Founder of the Seteais Palace in Sintra, Portugal

Daniel Gildemeester (1714–1793) was a Dutch businessman who settled in Portugal and became very wealthy, in part because he obtained the monopoly on the export of Brazilian diamonds from Portugal. The Dutch Consul-General in Lisbon, he is known as the founder of the Seteais Palace in Sintra.

== Arrival in Portugal ==
Gildemeester was born in Utrecht in 1714. He was one of three Dutch Protestant brothers who settled in the Portuguese capital of Lisbon. The first was Jan Gildemeester (1705–1779), father of the art collector, Jan Gildemeester, and in the 1730s Daniel and then Thomas (1720–1788), joined him and together established important business and social networks.

In 1740, Jan Gildemeester was appointed as the Consul-General of the Dutch Republic in Portugal. However, he had a poor relationship with Sebastião José de Carvalho e Melo, 1st Marquis of Pombal, chief minister of Portugal, and decided to return to the Netherlands in 1757, after the 1755 Lisbon earthquake and several disagreements with Pombal. He was succeeded in the Consul-General role by Daniel who, in contrast, had excellent relations with Pombal.

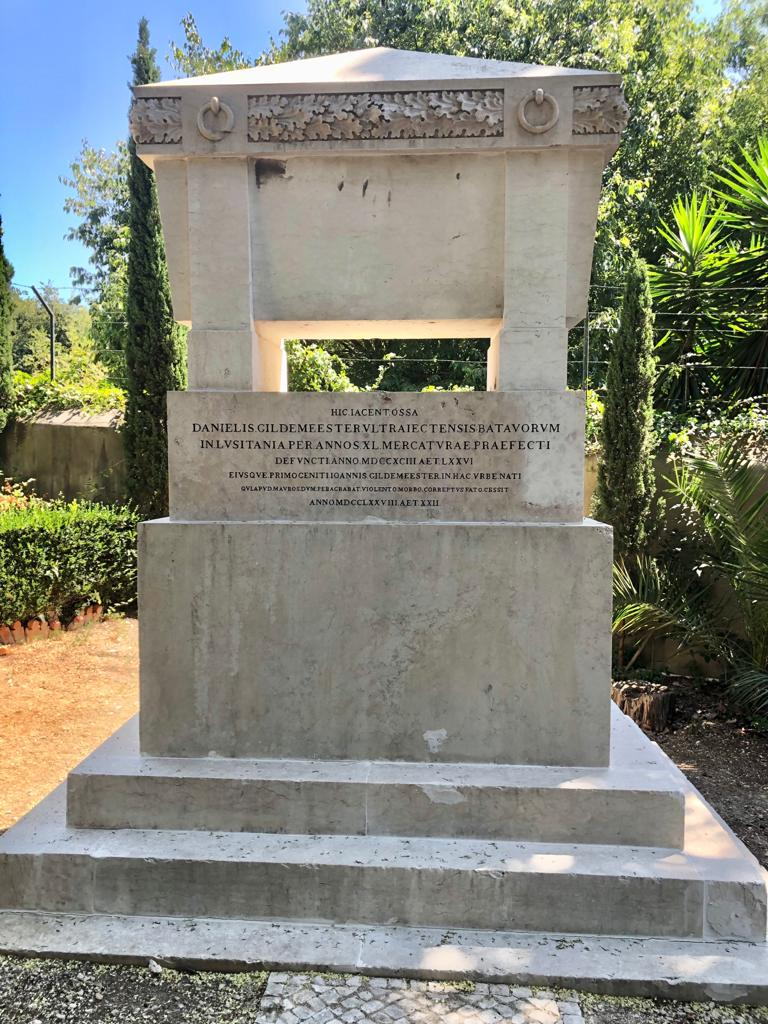
Gildemeester's tomb in Lisbon

== The diamond trade ==
The ability of Portugal to extract diamonds from its colony, Brazil, during the second quarter of the 18th century was not enough to enable it to fully exploit European diamond markets. Existing Dutch Jewish traders of diamonds from Asia were able to make it difficult for Brazilian diamonds to compete. The Marquis of Pombal, who believed that there was collusion between the existing Dutch and British exporters and the traders in the Netherlands, reached an agreement with Gildemeester for him to be the sole buyer of Brazilian diamonds for export from Portugal. At that time, everything produced in Brazil was sold through Portugal. Gildemeester committed to buying 40,000 carats a year, an arrangement that lasted from 1761 to 1787. Having a monopoly of the supply of Brazilian diamonds, he was able to stabilize the market and maintain their price in the Netherlands.

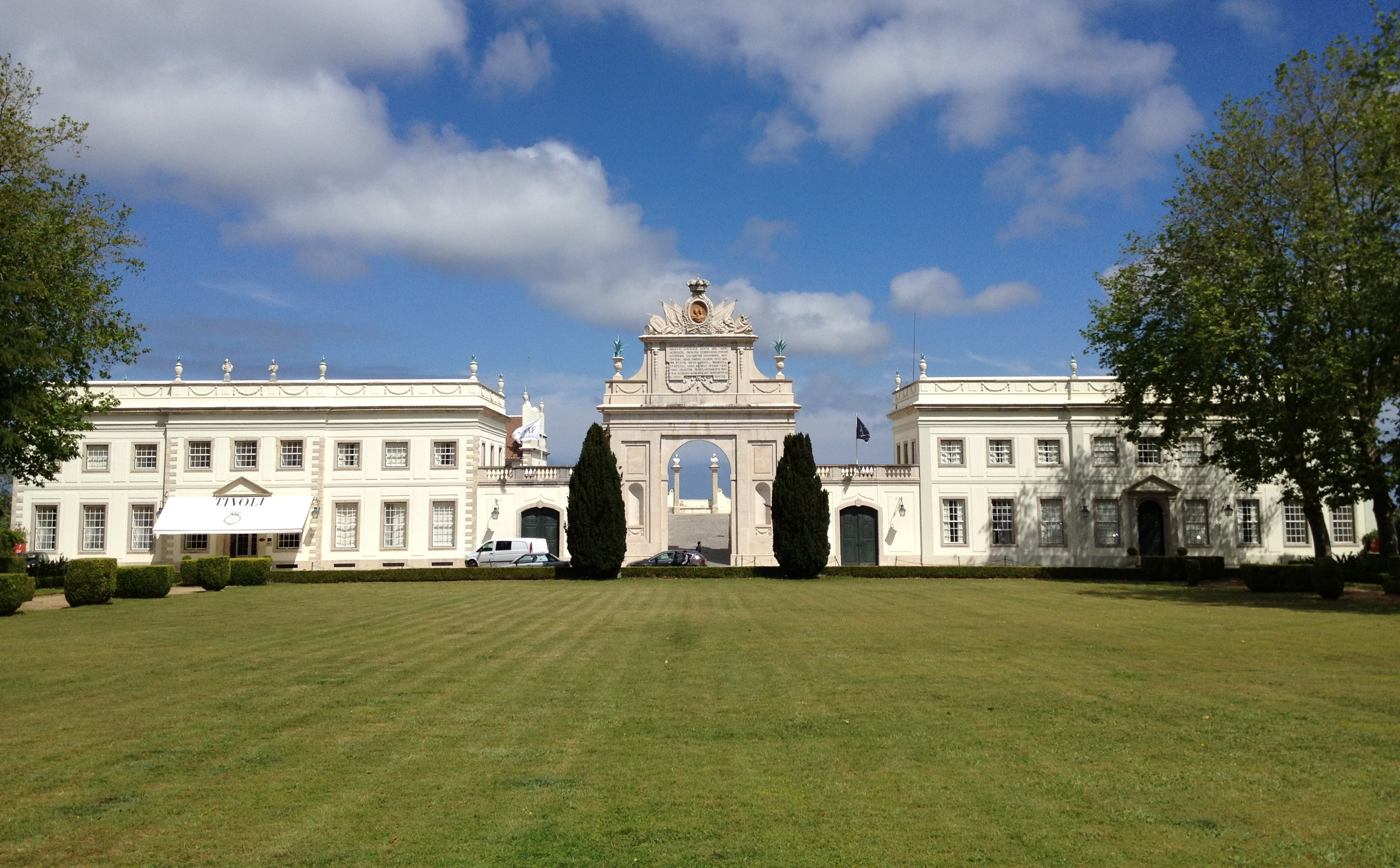
Seteais Palace in 2013

== Relations with the British ==
The British Cemetery, Lisbon was originally a British and Dutch Protestant cemetery. In 1779, Johannis Gildemeester, son of Daniel, was buried in a large tomb at a spot that the British had been planning for a new entrance to the cemetery. This caused considerable controversy but attempts by the British to persuade Gildemeester to move his son's grave were unsuccessful, given his high status, and it remains there to this day. When he died in 1793, he was buried in the same tomb.

== Sintra ==
Gildemeester made a large sum from the diamond trade. He purchased an area of land in Sintra, known as the Quinta da Alegria, but this land lacked a house and Gildemeester rented a home in Sintra for the summers from the Marquis of Pombal. He constructed what is now the western wing of the Seteais Palace (now a hotel) on his land, which was inaugurated on 25 July 1787. This was conveniently close to the home of his friend, Gerard de Visme, a wealthy British trader, who had a house on the site of what is now known as the Monserrate Palace.

== Death ==
Gildemeester died in 1793. It is said that he had been fond of giving lavish hospitality, which by the time of his death had consumed much of his wealth. His son, Daniel, also became Consul-General.
