= William Stephens (glassmaker) =

English entrepreneur and glass manufacturer

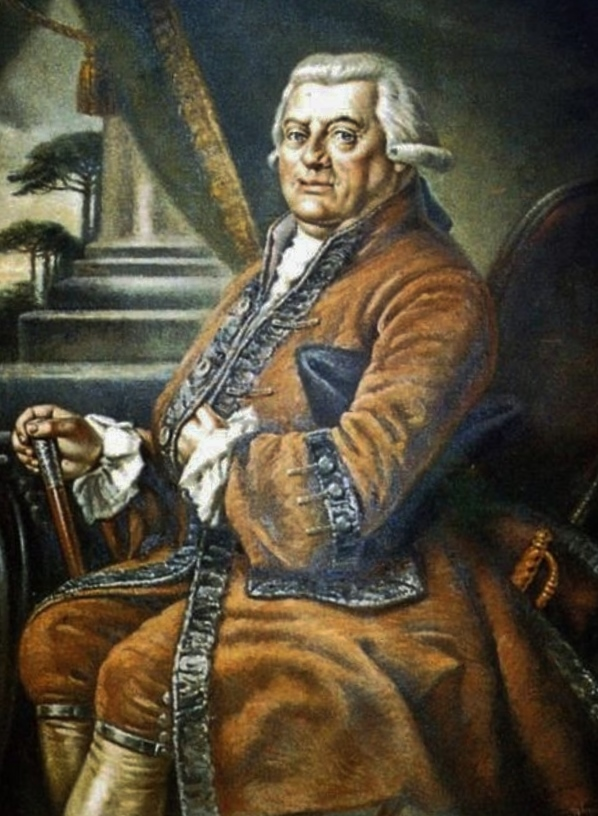
- Born: 16 May 1731; Cornwall, England
- Died: 11 May 1803 (aged 71); Lisbon, Portugal
- Occupation: Industrialist

William Stephens (16 May 1731 – 11 May 1803), known in Portugal as Guilherme Stephens, was an English entrepreneur and glass manufacturer who made a fortune in Portugal manufacturing lime after the 1755 Lisbon earthquake and then operating the Portuguese Royal Glassworks. He was a brilliant organiser, intelligent and charismatic, and he charmed dictators, queens and princes to become one of the richest industrialists in Europe.

== Early life and education ==
Stephens was the illegitimate son of Oliver Stephens, a schoolmaster in Cornwall, and Jane Smith a servant girl from the Pentillie estate. He was brought up by his grandparents at Pillaton. His father was trapped in a childless marriage, and had to move to Exeter but kept in touch with his son. When his wife died in 1743 Oliver Stephens married Jane Smith and had a larger family so that William Stephens was several years older than his siblings. He was educated in Exeter Free Grammar School and in 1746 went to Portugal where his uncle, John Stephens, was a merchant.

== Merchant in Portugal ==
English merchants in Lisbon were in a privileged position with exemptions from local tax and regulations. Stephens was signed on for seven years apprenticeship, but his uncle's business failed and he was taken as a partner on by a successful merchant, George Medley. At this time Carvalho e Melo was starting his rise to power and began getting into disputes with the English merchants. Then, in 1755, an earthquake destroyed Lisbon and much of the English commercial activity. Carvalho e Melo, however, enhanced his power by taking control of the situation.

== After the earthquake ==
Stephens recognised that there would soon be an urgent demand for building materials, and saw a way in which he could make more lime by using anthracite waste (culm) shipped from England, than the Portuguese could by using wood which was in short supply. As an unknown Englishman, he succeeded in getting an interview with Carvalho who was immediately enthusiastic about the idea. There was a difficult start as his English contact first sent the wrong sort of coal, and then the cargo ships were captured by the French. However Stephens rode these difficulties and was also helped by the passing of the Culm Act by the British Parliament in 1758 which exempted the material from duty. Stephens became a close and trusted friend of the Marquis of Pombal, the Portuguese Prime Minister, but for a number of reasons including economic depression and by rival Portuguese lime manufacturers he was unable to sell enough lime and was on the verge of bankruptcy by 1762. It was at this time that his three brothers and a sister were shipped out to join him in Portugal. With Carvalho's assistance the business recovered and was in full production by 1769. In the meantime Stephens had come under pressure from the King Joseph I and his minister Francisco Xavier de Mendonça to reopen and operate the royal glassworks factory in the village of Marinha Grande which had fallen into disuse.

== Glass manufacture ==
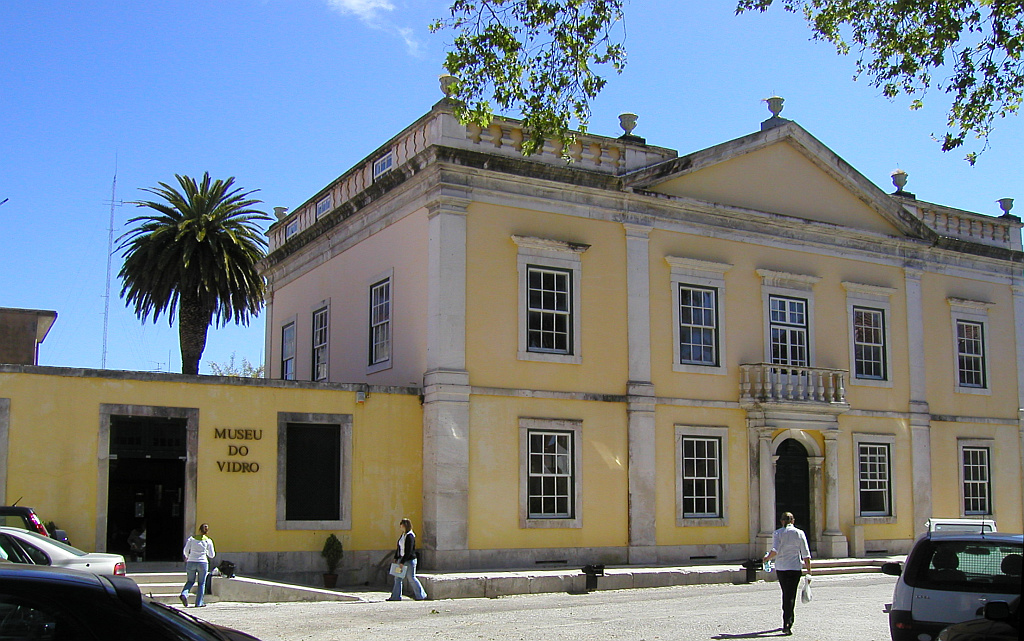
Palácio Stephens in Marinha Grande, currently the Museum of Glass

Stephens was given control of the glassworks and was granted several privileges, including an interest-free loan and exception from all taxes. He rebuilt the factory, but sales were affected by competition from imported glass and he persuaded Carvalho, now known as the Marquis of Pombal to raise import duties, giving him a monopoly of glass supply in Portugal and its colonies. This and the resurrected lime business made Stephens a wealthy man, and he built a palatial villa at Marinha Grande. However he also had enlightened views that a happy and motivated workforce was important to achieve productivity. He introduced a programme of social welfare to Marinha Grande. He opened schools, organised an illness relief fund and pension system, closed the taverns and introduced cultural activities, reorganised the food supply, and most significantly introduced developments to agriculture. He followed with interest the schemes of Thomas Coke of Holkham Hall and transformed agricultural productivity in the area.

Stephens had been introduced to Portuguese Court circles, and when Pombal fell from power on the king's death in 1777, he paid court to the new sovereign Maria I of Portugal and soon became her favourite industrialist. Stephens still remained loyal to his friend the Marquis of Pombal in his isolation from power. Maria increased Stephens' privileges and made two royal visits to Marinha Grande, but her mental health was unstable. In 1792, her son Prince John took over the reins of power, confirming the privileges conferred by his mother.

With the clouds of war gathering in 1803 Stephens died at the family house in Lisbon, leaving the glass factory to his brother, John James Stephens. On John James' death the glass factory was ceded to the Portuguese government. Both are buried in the British Cemetery, Lisbon, along with other brothers. The fortune passed to the Lyne family and finally descended to Stephens Lyne-Stephens and the Court of Chancery.
