= The British Factory in Lisbon =

Body of British Merchants in Lisbon, Portugal

The British Factory at Lisbon (called the English Factory before the Union of 1707 and the feitoria inglesa in Portuguese) was the association of British merchants resident in Lisbon. A factory in this sense was not a workshop but a body of factors. Factors are resident commercial agents, with the funds, officers and privileges attached to them. It was the largest British mercantile community in Portugal and had a smaller counterpart in Porto.

== Origins and organisation ==
The Factory appears to have grown out of the confraternity attached to the English merchants' chapel of St George in São Domingos.

It was never incorporated, held no charter, and appears in official papers simply as the Consul and the Merchants. Its presiding officer was the Consul-General, at first chosen by the merchants and later nominated by the Crown. It had its own by-laws and maintained a burial ground, a chapel, a chaplain, a hospital and a relief fund. The fund came from consulage, a levy of four réis per milréis (or thousand Portuguese réis) on British goods imported into Portugal, which an Act of 1721 allowed to be recovered through the masters of British ships. There were about sixty English merchants at Lisbon in 1660 and some ninety by 1717. The Lisbon Almanach for 1788 to 1791 lists about seventy British houses.

== Privileges ==
The Factory's privileges rested on the Anglo-Portuguese commercial treaty of 1654, which its members called their Magna Carta. A secret article capped customs duties on English goods at 23 per cent of their value. The most valued privilege was exemption from the ordinary Portuguese courts through a Judge Conservator, without whose written order no British subject could be arrested except when taken in the act. The judge was a Portuguese lawyer nominated by the Factory and paid by it, and the post was worth about £300 a year. A burial ground was leased in 1717 and became the British Cemetery.

== Decline ==
The 1755 Lisbon earthquake destroyed much of the Factory's property, and Parliament voted a relief grant of £100,000. Under the Marquis of Pombal the Factory had to defend privileges that had long gone unquestioned, among them its position in the corn trade. Its grievances were printed in London in 1766 and referred to the Board of Trade, and W. H. Lyttelton was sent to Lisbon in 1768 to demand redress. The Anglo-Portuguese treaty of 1810 ended the old system of privileges. The body continued to meet for some years, and a minute book among the Lisbon embassy records runs from February 1811 to June 1824. Most of its archive is lost: the papers were shipped to England during the French occupation and went down with the vessel in the Bay of Biscay, and Richard Lodge admitted in 1932 that he knew neither when the Factory began nor when it ended. The last journal of the Factory is held by the British Historical Society of Portugal.

== See also ==
- Anglo-Portuguese Alliance
- Methuen Treaty
- Factory House
- British Cemetery, Lisbon
- The British Factory in Porto
