= William Godfrey Thomas Pope =

English businessman in Portugal (1880–1943)

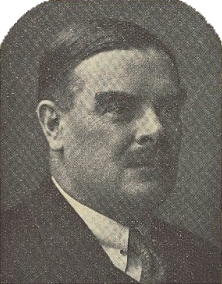
- Born: William George Baden Thomas Pope; 15 April 1880; Lisbon, Portugal
- Died: 15 May 1943 (aged 63); Lisbon
- Occupations: Engineer and businessman

William Godfrey Thomas Pope OBE (15 April 1880 – 15 May 1943) was a British citizen, who distinguished himself as an engineer and businessman in Portugal as General Manager of the Anglo-Portuguese Telephone Company.

== Early life ==
William Godfrey Thomas Pope was born on 15 April 1880, the son of Thomas Godfrey Pembroke Pope, who was chaplain of St George's Anglican Church in Lisbon, capital of Portugal. His mother, Louisa Ann (née Baden-Powell), was a half-sister to the founder of the Scouting movement, Robert Baden-Powell. He was first baptised as William George Baden Thomas Pope, but his father changed his name after the death of his younger brother Richard Godfrey Pope, in order to keep the name Godfrey in the family. William did not follow his father into the church but, instead, became an engineer. He went to Lancing College in West Sussex, England and Trinity College, Oxford, before studying engineering at the City and Guilds Technical College in London. In 1902 he returned to Portugal to work for the Anglo-Portuguese Telephone Company and, in 1904, married Eileen Hickie, who he had known for many years.

== Career ==
In 1905, the couple went back to London, where Pope worked for the National Telephone Company. After the birth of their son, they moved to Argentina, where Pope worked as an engineer and later as the Chief Engineer of the United River Plate Telephone Company in Buenos Aires. He returned to Europe with the outbreak of World War I and served in the Signals Division of the Royal Engineers in France, being awarded a Military Cross. Fighting alongside Portuguese units, he was awarded the Portuguese Cruz de Guerra. He briefly worked in the Communications Branch of the British Air Ministry. After demobilisation, he remained in the Reserve of Officers for 16 years, reaching the rank of Lieutenant Colonel.

After the War, Pope returned to Portugal in 1920 to become the general manager of The Anglo-Portuguese Telephone Company, which was responsible for communications in Lisbon and the neighbouring area. He held the position until his retirement in 1939. He was awarded the Order of Entrepreneurial Merit (Industrial category). On the outbreak of World War II he became responsible for propaganda at the British Embassy in Lisbon, for which he was made an officer of the Order of the British Empire in 1941.

At the Anglo-Portuguese Telephone Company, Pope oversaw a considerable expansion in its activities. However, he faced numerous problems, including the high rate of inflation and the decline of the Portuguese currency, when the company was purchasing much of its equipment from the United Kingdom. The company's costs were rising daily but its tariffs were fixed annually by the government, a situation from which Pope only extricated the company with great difficulty. A common criticism of the company was that all its managers were British, who were being paid high salaries, and this was allegedly the reason why it was charging high prices. Labour strikes were also a problem, until the authoritarian Estado Novo government banned strikes in 1933.

== Community life ==
Pope was an active member of the British community in Portugal, being on the committee of the British Hospital in Lisbon for many years. He served on the committee of the Royal British Club, and was briefly chairman. He was also active in the Boy Scout movement, being responsible for the development of several scouting centres. He was churchwarden and an organist at St George's Church. He was also the driving force behind the construction of St Paul's Church in Estoril, to the west of Lisbon. Pope also maintained good relations with the Portuguese elite, being friendly with the tenth president of Portugal, Manuel Gomes da Costa, who was briefly in that position in 1926.

== Death ==
Pope died on 15 May 1943 at the British Hospital in Lisbon, aged 63. He was buried in the British Cemetery, Lisbon. In addition to their son, he and his wife had a daughter. After his death, a road leading to a new, large telephone exchange was named after him.
