= Glass Museum of Marinha Grande (Portugal) =

Glass museum near Leiria, Portugal

Glass Museum of Marinha Grande (Museu do Vidro da Marinha Grande), Portugal
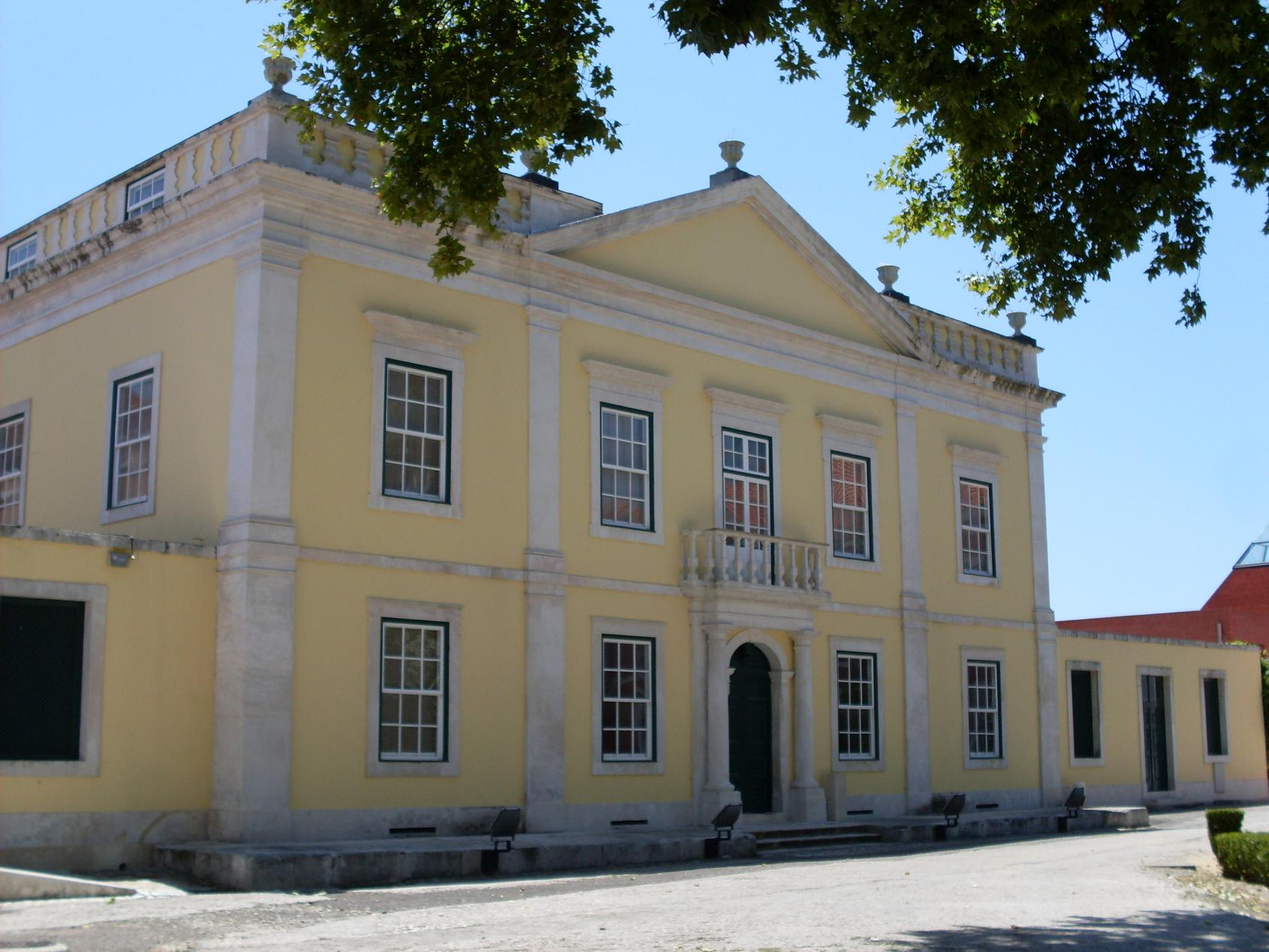

- Location within Portugal
- Established: 1998; 28 years ago
- Location: Palácio Stephens, Praça Guilherme Stephens / 2430-522 Marinha Grande, Portugal
- Coordinates: 39.7494°N 8.9335°W
- Website: https://www.cm-mgrande.pt/pages/308

The Marinha Grande Glass Museum (Portuguese: Museu do Vidro da Marinha Grande) is in the Marinha Grande (Portuguese pronunciation: [mɐˈɾiɲɐ ˈɣɾɐ̃dɨ]) municipality in the Leiria District of Portugal. The museum is situated on the site of the first major glassworks in Portugal, established by the British Stephens family, and makes use of some of the original buildings, including the owners’ residence.

== History ==
The glass industry in Marinha Grande began when an enterprise operated by John Beare, an Irishman, moved from the left bank of the river Tagus, to Leiria District in 1747 to take advantage of cheaper and better-quality raw materials there. Beare took all his workers with him. The attraction of the location was its proximity to sandy beaches and to a forest of 11,500 hectares of maritime pine trees, which had been planted in the 13th century, initially by King Afonso III and later by his son King Denis. Originally planted to act as a barrier to the invasion of farming areas by coastal sand, the pine trees proved ideal for powering glass factories. Beare experienced financial difficulties and, following the closure of the factory for two years, it was developed by an Englishman, William Stephens.

Stephens had been born in Exeter, England but made his way to Portugal at an early age, where, in 1746, he was apprenticed to a company in Lisbon operating lime kilns and, over time, had been very successful in the business. In 1769, fourteen years after the 1755 Lisbon earthquake Portugal was still desperate for glass to assist with rebuilding the country, much of which had been affected by the earthquake. This need for glass was clearly identified by the Marquis of Pombal, prime minister at the time, who played a major role in the reconstruction of Portugal after the earthquake. William Stephens had come to his attention as a competent businessman and Pombal persuaded King D. José to grant a Royal Charter to allow Stephens to re-open an existing glass factory, which became known as the Royal Glassworks (Portuguese: Real Fabrica de Vidros). Stephens was also given a large interest-free loan as well as permission to use the pine trees to fire the factory's kilns. He was nevertheless hesitant to take on the task, given his lack of experience with glass making, and is said to have taken two years to make up his mind to accept Pombal's offer.

Stephens was joined by his younger brother, John James, and by the end of the first year the Stephens brothers were employing 150 men in the glassworks, had manufactured 12,000 sheets of window glass and had sent over a hundred crates of glass to Lisbon. They recruited glass-making experts from both England and Genoa. In 1773, having petitioned the King to provide protection against imports from Bohemia, which, William Stephens argued, were being sold at low prices in order to drive the Marinha Grande factory out of business, they were granted a monopoly of glass supply within Portugal and its colonies. This monopoly and the tax exemptions William Stephens received as an English merchant in Lisbon enabled the brothers to become extremely rich.

The factory led to the rapid development of Marinha Grande, as many other companies were attracted to the area. It was a pioneer in the provision of social welfare by employers, providing medical care, sick benefits and pensions, as well as a school. The Stephens Brothers established a horticultural farm and a slaughterhouse, the latter to address a shortage of meat caused by the rapid increase in the number of workers at the factory. They followed the agricultural schemes of Thomas Coke of Holkham Hall and transformed agricultural productivity in the area. The factory also had its own theatre, in which the employees performed, on several occasions for visiting royalty. These enlightened ideas for the time were shared by the Marquis of Pombal and William Stephens was a member of a group advising him on social and educational reform.

On the death of William in 1802 the factory was continued by John James Stephens, who became the richest man in Lisbon, noted for his eccentricities. It was briefly taken over by the French during the Peninsular War but after the expulsion of the French the Royal Charter was renewed in May, 1810. On his death, John James bequeathed the factory to the Portuguese nation. For some time it was neglected. Its fortunes were gradually restored by the Portuguese industrialist, Manuel Joaquim Afonso, who introduced steam engines and new glass-making techniques. Then, between 1864 and 1894, another Englishman, George Croft, together with António Augusto Dias de Freitas, introduced new furnaces and technologies, with a particular emphasis on crystal production. Marinha Grande is now Portugal's biggest glass manufacturer and is known by the nickname of 'The Crystal City'.

The family fortune was inherited by Stephens Lyne-Stephens, an English Tory politician, who was reputed to be the richest commoner in England. On his death in 1860, his wife, a French ballerina, inherited the estate but there were numerous other claimants who went so far as to tamper with their family trees to bolster their claims. In the end most of the money seems to have ended up with lawyers and the British Government.

== The museum ==
The idea for a museum was first proposed by a Government Decree in 1954, which established the Stephens Brothers School Factory. However, development of the museum did not begin until 1994, with architectural responsibility being given to José Fava. The museum opened in 1998 and presents both the history of the evolution of glass, as well technological aspects of glass production. Part of the museum is located in the former house of the Stephens, which was built within the factory perimeter. Built around 1770, the building is notable for its neoclassical style.

The Marinha Grande museum is the only museum in Portugal specifically dedicated to the study of the art and craft of the glass industry. As well, it offers a cultural programme and is considered one of the most important educational centres on the subject of glass. The collection of the museum has been developed over the years by the Portuguese Association of Industrial Archeology (APAI) (Portuguese: Associação Portuguesa de Arqueologia Industrial). Some of the pieces on display are on loan from other Government agencies and from the municipality of Marinha Grande. Displays show the art of glassmaking and explain the techniques used as well as displaying the most significant examples of glass art from Marinha Grande and from other Portuguese glassmaking areas, such as Vila Nova de Gaia.

The museum houses examples of glass from the 17th to the present century, which are divided into two collections. The first, situated in the former home of the Stephens Brothers, covers artistic glass as well as the technology of the production of different types of glass, such as decorative, utilitarian and scientific glass. In particular, the exhibition area reflects the evolution of the glass industry in Portugal. It shows examples of the machines and tools used in the manufacturing and decoration processes; documents from the factory; production catalogues and drawings; as well as the clothing and objects of daily use of the workers. The Contemporary Art Nucleus is located in a modern building of three floors that has been integrated into the former factory. With a collection dating from 1999, it presents about 25 years of contemporary glass art created in Portugal and elsewhere, seeking to represent the most varied artistic and design trends. The museum is a partner of the European Glass Experience.
