= Anglo-Portuguese Telephone Company =

Portuguese telecommunications company, 1887-1967

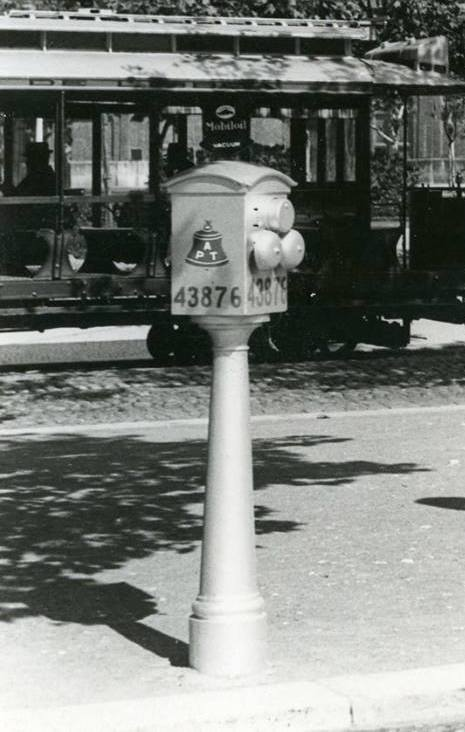
An APT call box in Lisbon in the 1940s.

The British-owned Anglo-Portuguese Telephone Company (APT) provided telephone services in Portugal's two largest cities of Lisbon and Porto between 1887 and 1967. It was locally referred to as the Companhia dos Telefones. In 1967, it was transferred to the Portuguese State.

== Origins ==
The first attempts by the Portuguese government to attract a company to operate a telephone service in Lisbon and Porto were unsuccessful. This was probably because the government was expecting to receive 5% of the gross profits. The second tender resulted in only one proposal, from the Edison Gower-Bell Telephone Company of Europe, Ltd. Under the agreement, the government would receive 7.125% of the company's net revenue. Edison was managed from Britain by its chairman, George Edward Gouraud. The contract was signed in January 1882 and gave Edison exclusivity in the operation of telephone services in Lisbon and Porto for 20 years, with the Portuguese State able to implement a service elsewhere in the country. Services began in Lisbon in April 1882 and in Porto in July of the same year.

In 1887, Edison decided to create a specific telephone company for Portugal. The contract with the government was changed, with the percentage to be paid by the new company now stipulated as 3% of the gross revenue. The new Anglo-Portuguese Telephone Company had two boards of directors, one based in London and the other operating in Portugal. Members of the latter included Afonso de Serpa Leitão Freire Pimentel, 1st Count of Gouveia and the businessman Jorge O'Neill. Becoming known locally as the Companhia dos Telefones, APT encountered a few early difficulties, including charges made by Lisbon City Council for using its roads to install telephone wires. However, the contract with the government was renewed in 1901. In 1927, the arrangements were extended until 1967.

== Early operations ==
During the first half of 1891, APT set up 64 lines in the city of Lisbon and made similar progress in Porto. By the turn of the century both Lisbon and Porto had over one thousand subscribers. In 1904 a connection between Lisbon and Porto was installed. When World War I broke out, APT had around 8000 subscribers. During World War I the company experienced difficulties in obtaining phones, cable and other equipment. Connecting new subscribers was delayed and by 1920 APT had a waiting list of 3000, taking more than two and a half months to fulfil orders. Its performance was also affected by the fact that some of its staff were drafted into the military.

== Criticisms ==
Initially, subscribers' phones were connected to a manual exchange where calls were connected by an operator. From the 1920s, travellers were pointing out that many other European countries already had direct dialling and complaints about APT's services began to make their way into newspapers and into the Portuguese parliament. In 1919, a company succeeded in winning damages for APT's failure to provide a service. In 1923, a subscriber won a court case after refusing to pay APT for the days when their phone was not working. Sometimes, delays in fixing problems were so long that businesses announced in the press when their phones had finally been reconnected.

In January 1921, the owner of the Teatro da Trindade in Lisbon sold it to the APT. The theatre had been opened in 1867. When it was originally constructed, there was a theatre and a separate hall, where events such as the first Portuguese presentation of Edison's phonograph had taken place. The APT demolished the hall and built its offices on the site and a few months later started to auction some of the contents of the theatre. This caused an outcry among the theatre-going public. An impresario, José Loureiro, then bought the theatre, which was not needed by APT, and it continues to flourish.

== Labour relations ==
The period from 1910 in Portugal was one of much labour unrest. In November of that year, a strike was declared by APT workers, who demanded better wages and fewer hours of work. There were more strikes in 1911, 1912, 1918 (when APT employees formed a union), 1920, and 1924. The situation improved somewhat when the company appointed a new general manager, William Godfrey Thomas Pope, in 1920, who came from a British family living in Lisbon. The company experienced difficulties in retaining staff. In addition to strikes, there were some acts of sabotage and, in 1920, bomb attacks were made on the homes of two APT directors. The Porto exchange was also sabotaged. Strikes and sabotage were not just caused by perceived low wages; the employees were also vociferous about the conditions of their work and received support from the media. Under the authoritarian Estado Novo regime, unions and strikes were banned at the end of 1933. APT does not appear to have been affected by the Portuguese general strike of 1934, called to protest the new laws, and there were no further strikes until one in 1942. At this time, the government requisitioned employees of utility companies into the military and threatened APT employees with being accused of desertion if they did not return to work.

APT made some efforts to improve labour relations by providing company medical services. In 1938 it ran an anti-tuberculosis campaign. Staff training had been instituted in 1910, with a school for telephone operators, and APT set up a training section for all employees in 1927. A Pension Fund was established in 1934. A major cause of dissent was a contract that female telephone operators were required to sign, stating that "in case of contracting marriage [the operator] will undertake to immediately leave the service of the Company". This rule, which Portugal also applied to nurses, was introduced in the 1920s and was not ended until October 1940.

== An era of inflation ==
Due to rapid price inflation, the government permitted numerous increases in the tariff charged by APT between 1918 and 1923. The increases were justified by the company because of the devaluation of the Portuguese escudo against the pound sterling, the improvements in services, and salary increases for workers. However, critics argued that APT was employing British managers, who occupied all the senior positions and were much more expensive than Portuguese ones. APT's labour and other costs were rising rapidly, but its tariff was based on an annual rate, which was quickly losing value. In 1924, the government agreed that charges should be based on calls made rather than an annual fixed charge but this decision was reversed almost immediately, after numerous complaints. After the 28 May 1926 coup d'état that led to the Ditadura Nacional, the forerunner of the Estado Novo, the company again renegotiated its contract. This agreement for a 40-year extension, which introduced tariffs per call but only for new subscribers, was signed in 1927. In 1928, the first international telephone connection was made to Madrid in Spain, followed soon after by a connection to England.

The Administração Geral dos Correios, Telégrafos e Telefones (General Administration of Posts, Telegraphs and Telephones – AGCTT or CTT) was the body responsible for supervising APT. In 1936, under pressure from AGCTT, APT was required to install meters to enable subscribers to check charges levied. In 1942, during a strike in APT, some directors of AGCTT argued for the nationalization of the company. In 1948, AGCTT opposed a request for a tariff increase, forcing Sir Alexander Roger, the UK Chairman of APT, to intervene directly with the Portuguese dictator, António de Oliveira Salazar, later leading to an audience with the President, Francisco Higino Craveiro Lopes.

== The end of APT ==
The number of subscribers increased rapidly as phones became more affordable, the service improved and the populations of Lisbon and Porto grew. Automation of telephone networks began in 1930 but full automation was not completed in Lisbon and Porto until the 1950s. Although Portugal was neutral during World War II, expanding the number of subscribers was affected by the dislocation that the War caused, leading to new waiting lists from 1941 onwards that reached 15,000 in 1948. APT installed its 100,000th telephone in 1950. On December 31, 1967, at the end of its contract, the Anglo-Portuguese Telephone Company ceased operating in Portugal, following a government decision to transfer the business to the Portuguese State. It was replaced by the public company, Telefones de Lisboa e Porto (TLP). In 1994, companies providing services to the rest of the country, Teledifusora de Portugal (TDP) and Telecom Portugal (TP), were merged with TLP to create a national telecommunications company called Portugal Telecom (PT), now a subsidiary of the French Group Altice.
