= Seteais Palace =

Coordinates: 38°47′47″N 9°23′46″W

- Palácio de Seteais
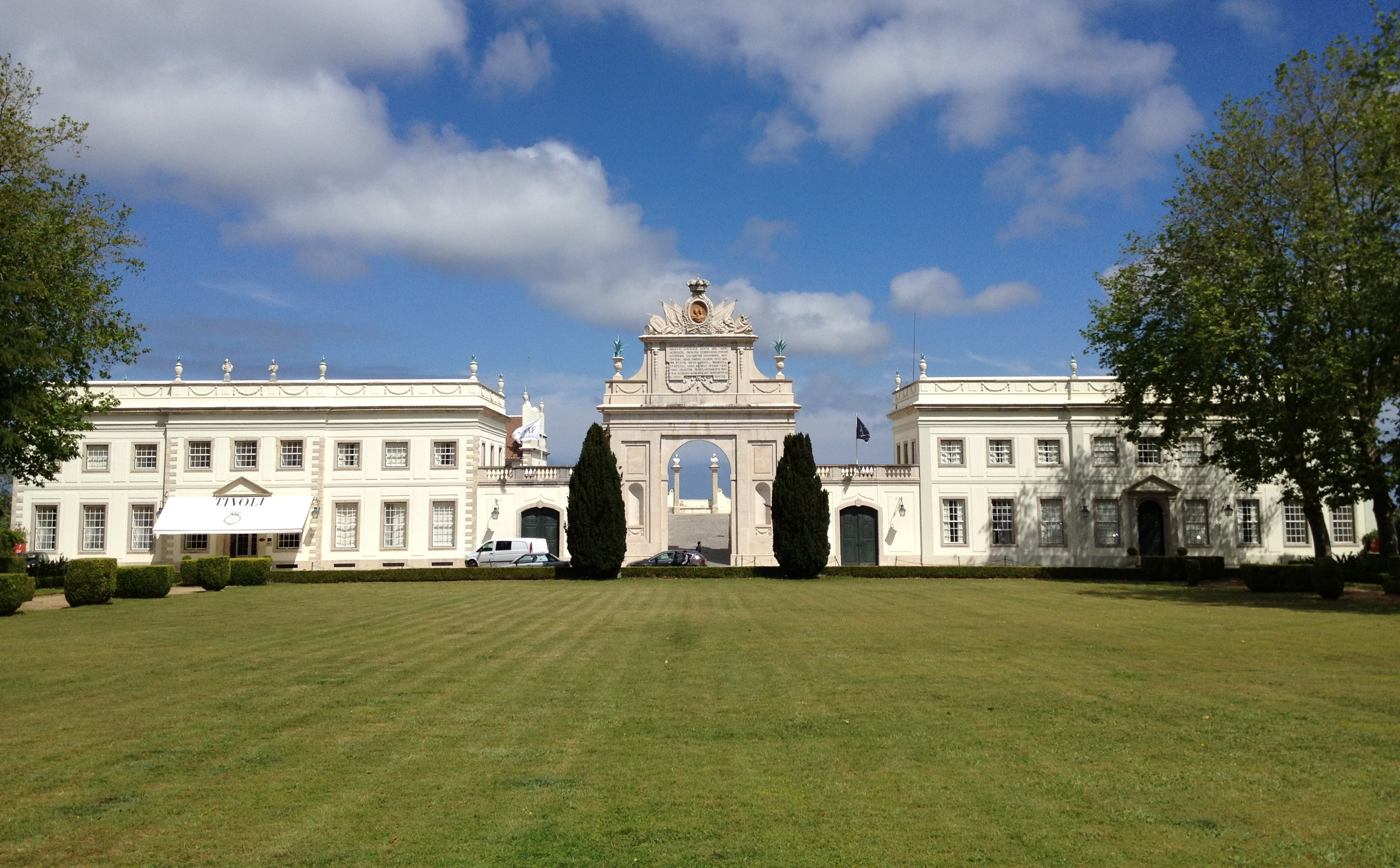
- Alternative names: Valverde Sintra Palácio de Seteais
- Hotel chain: Hóteis Valverde

General information
- Status: Luxury hotel
- Architectural style: Neoclassic
- Location: Sintra, Portugal

Website
- Valverde Sintra Palácio de Seteais website

UNESCO World Heritage Site
- Part of: Cultural Landscape of Sintra
- Criteria: Cultural: (ii), (iv), (v)
- Reference: 723
- Inscription: 1995 (19th Session)

Portuguese National Monument
- Type: Non-movable
- Criteria: Monument of Public Interest
- Designated: 28 June 1947
- Reference no.: IPA.00006094

The Seteais Palace (Portuguese: Palácio de Seteais) is a neoclassical palace located in Sintra, on the Portuguese Riviera, operating as a luxury hotel known as the Tivoli Palácio de Seteais Hotel. The palace is a national landmark and is included in the UNESCO Cultural Landscape of Sintra World Heritage Site listing.

== Etymology ==
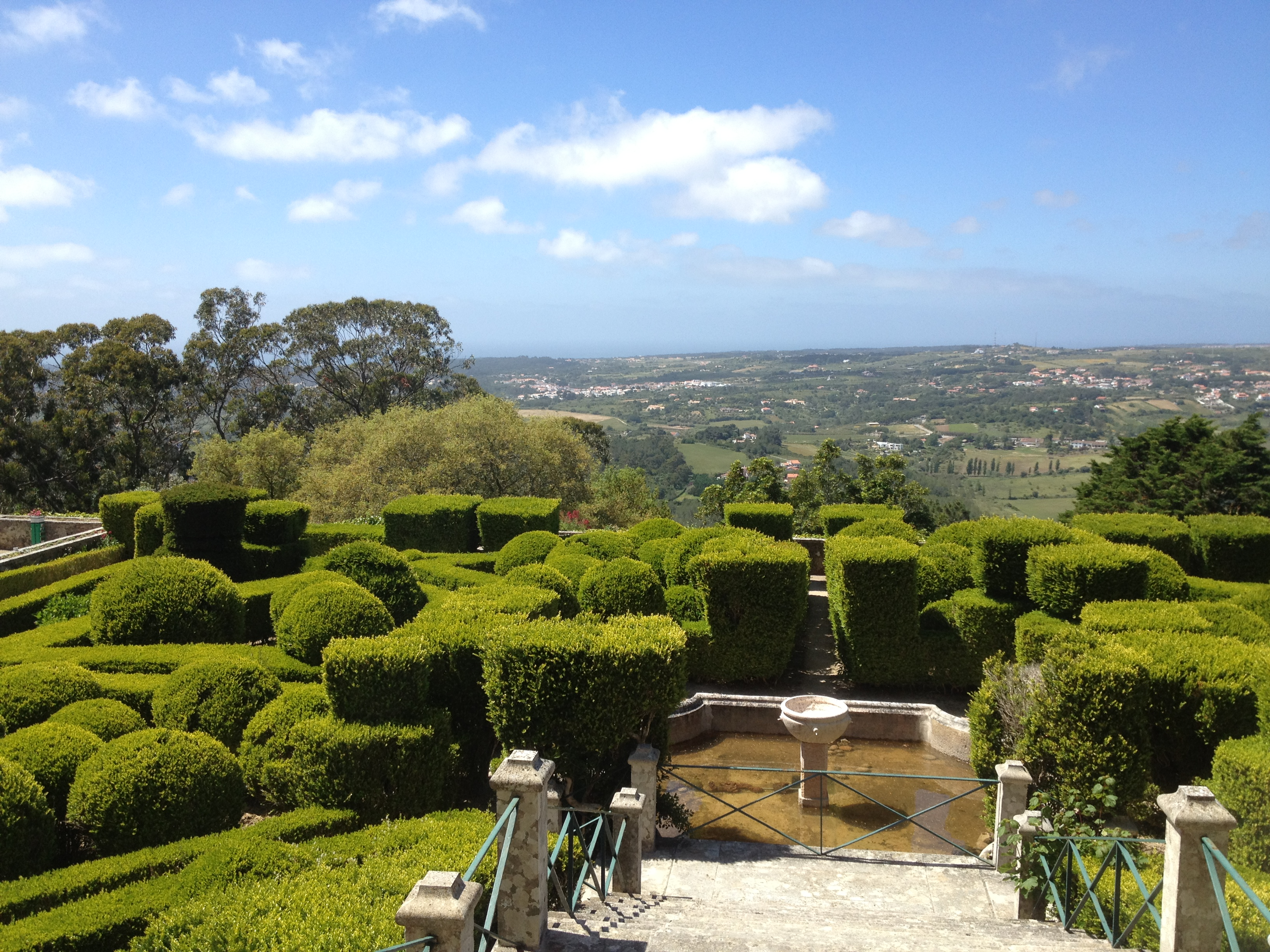
View from the palace gardens.

Jose Alfredo mentions in “Seteais fields” that this field is very old and has always been an integral part of the precinct behind the palace. Some people believe that its name comes from the tradition of shouting “ai” on the road where its echo is repeated 7 times. On the other hand, a very old manuscript by an anonymous author kept in Sintra library mentions that the origin of the word of Seteais derives from the land named Centeais where rye (Portuguese: Centeio) was being cultivated.

== History ==
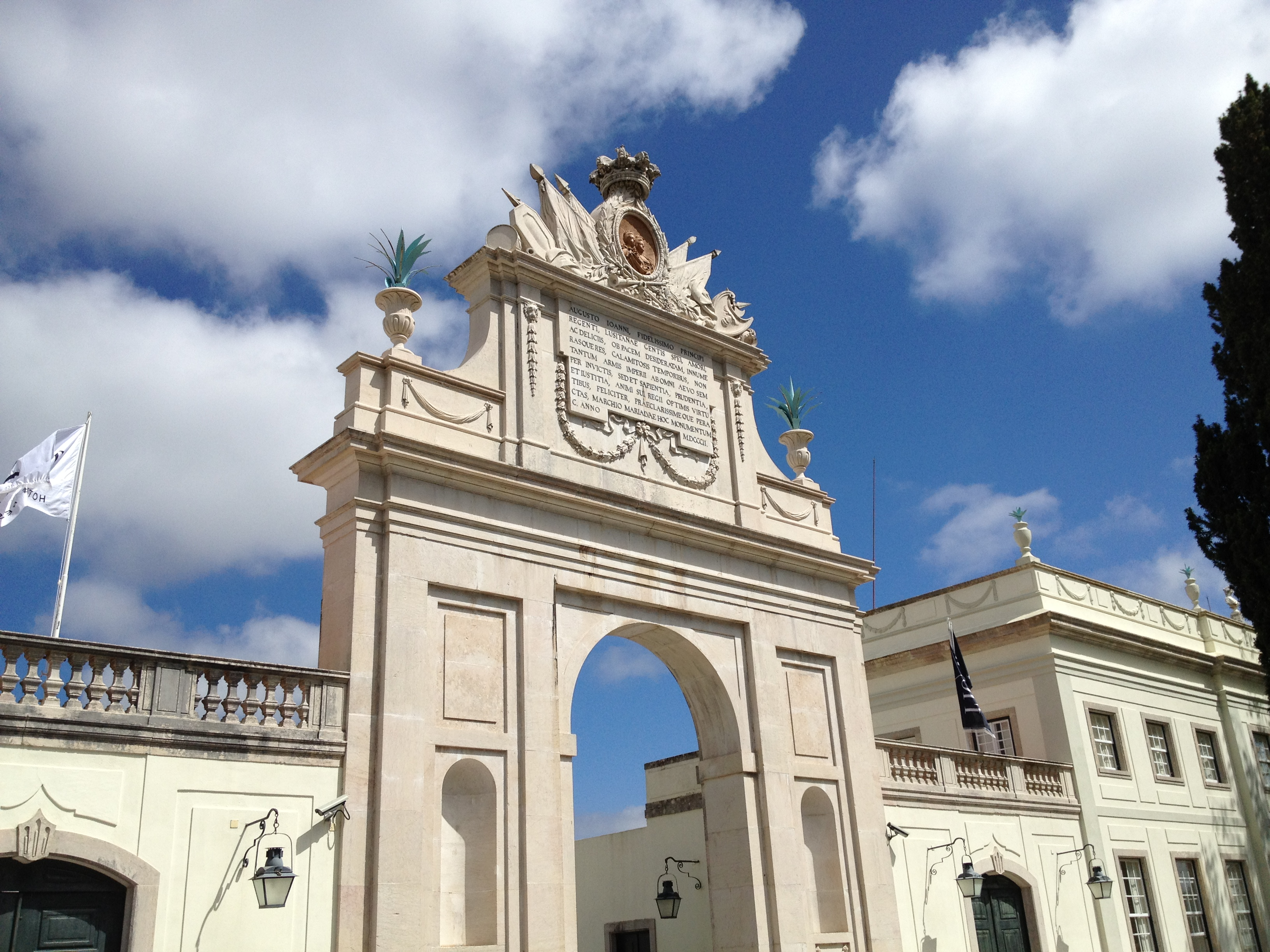
The triumphal arch erected in honor of the 1802 visit of King João VI of Portugal and Queen Carlota Joaquina of Spain to Seteais Palace.

The Seteais Palace was built between 1783 and 1787 for the Dutch consul Daniel Gildemeester, on lands granted by Sebastião José de Carvalho e Melo, 1st Marquis of Pombal.

Although Daniel Gildemeester owned land, then known as Quinta da Alegria, there was no house to live in. He had stayed in the palace of the Marquis of Pombal as a tenant during summer. He started to build his own mansion close to (Monserrate Palace) owned by his friend, the British consul Gerard de Visme, in order to leave the palace of the Marquis of Pombal.

The consul chose to build his house on the border of an elevation, from which the vast landscape around the Sintra Mountains could be admired. The palace was surrounded with a large garden with fruit trees.

In 1797, some years after the consul's death, his widow sold the palace to Diogo José Vito de Menezes Noronha Coutinho, 5th Marquis of Marialva. The palace was enlarged between 1801 and 1802, probably by neoclassical architect José da Costa e Silva, architect of the São Carlos Theatre in Lisbon. The palace was turned into a symmetrical U-shaped building, with the consul's house becoming one of its wings. The cornice of the buildings that compose the main façade was decorated with typical neoclassical motifs like vases, busts and reliefs of garlands. The gardens of the palace were remodelled following romantic trends.

The old and the new wings were connected in 1802 by a neoclassical arch, built in honour of Prince regent John and Princess Carlota Joaquina, who visited the palace in that year. The monumental arch, decorated with the bronze effigies of the royal pair and a commemorative Latin inscription, is attributed to architect Francisco Leal Garcia.

The walls of several inner rooms of the palace were decorated with frescos attributed to French painter Jean-Baptiste Pillement and his followers. Painted motifs include exotic vegetation and mythological characters, typical of the neoclassical taste.

After changing hands several times, the palace was acquired by the Portuguese government in 1946. The Seteais Palace has been used as a luxury hotel since 1954 but its original characteristics have been preserved.

== See also ==
- Palace of Sintra
- Pena Palace
- Palace of Queluz
- Palace of Mafra
- Monserrate Palace
