= Marinha Grande =

- Municipality
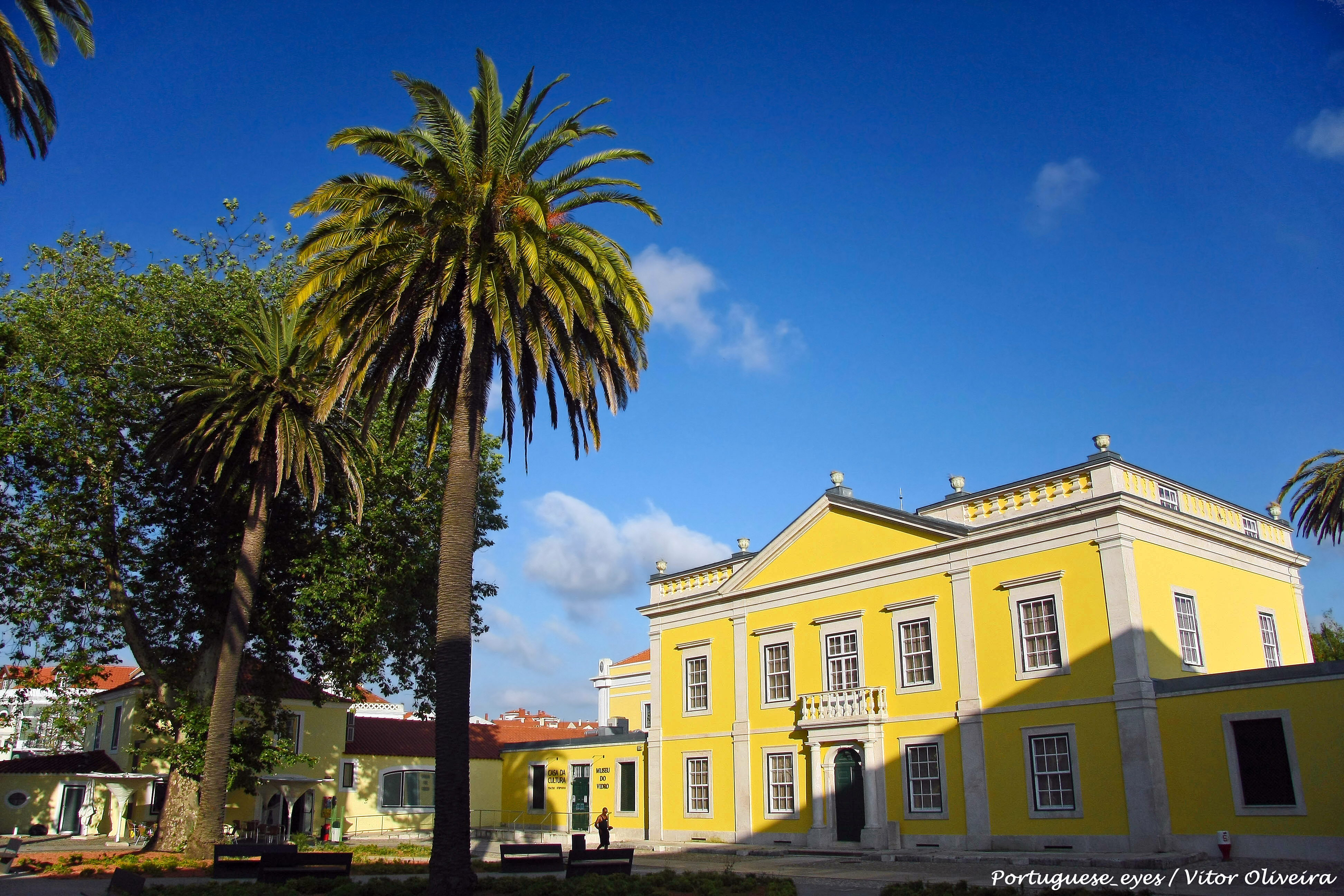
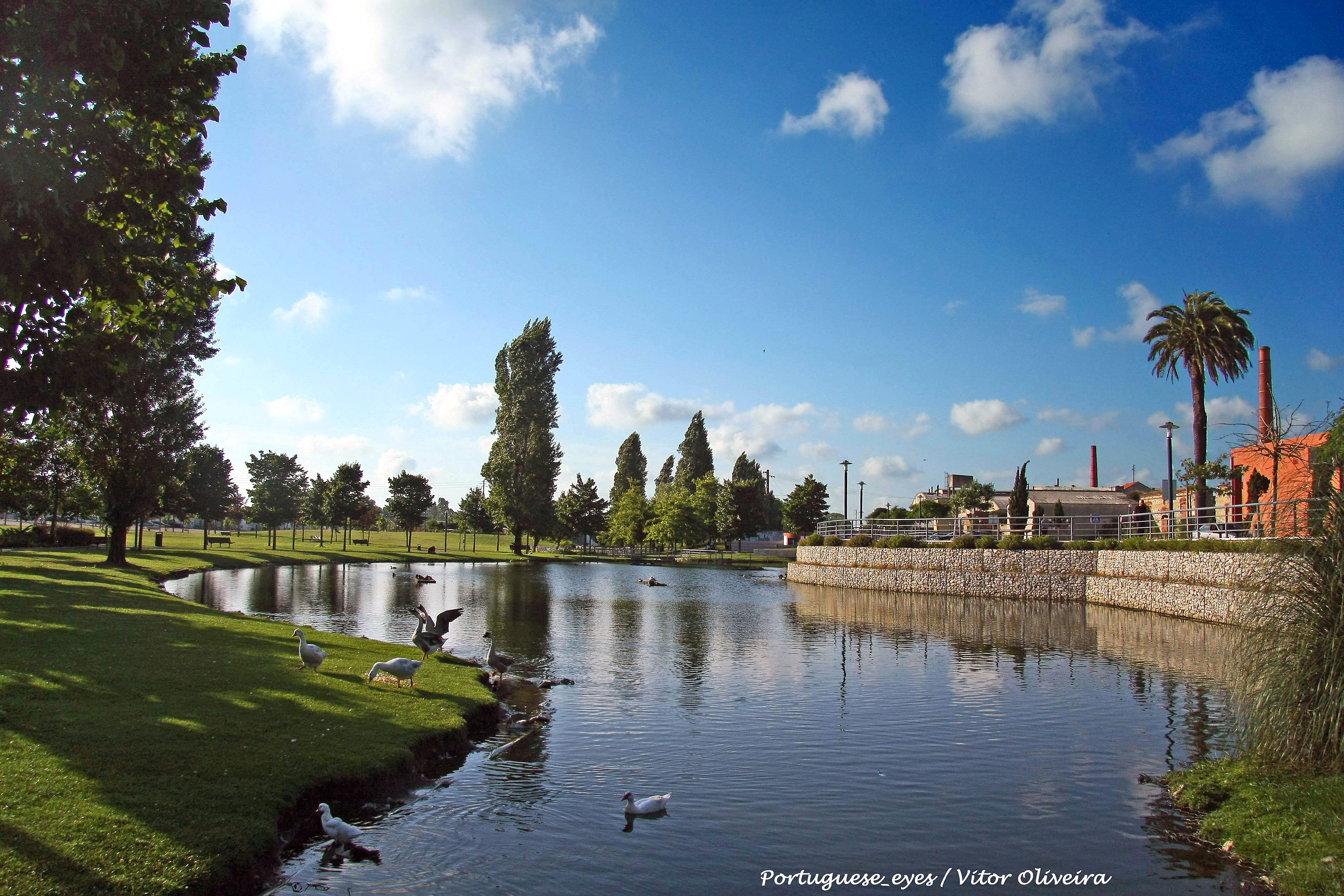
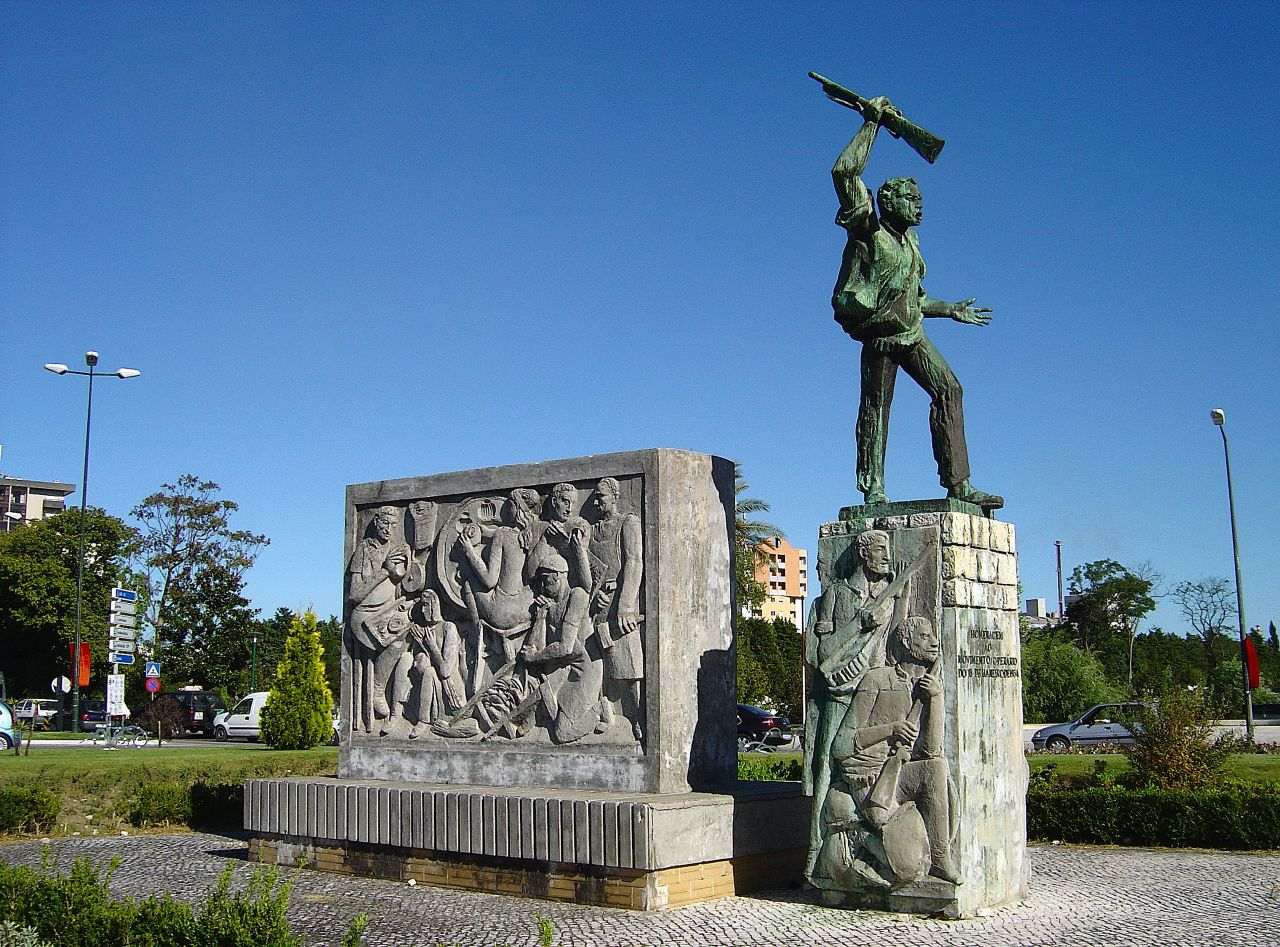
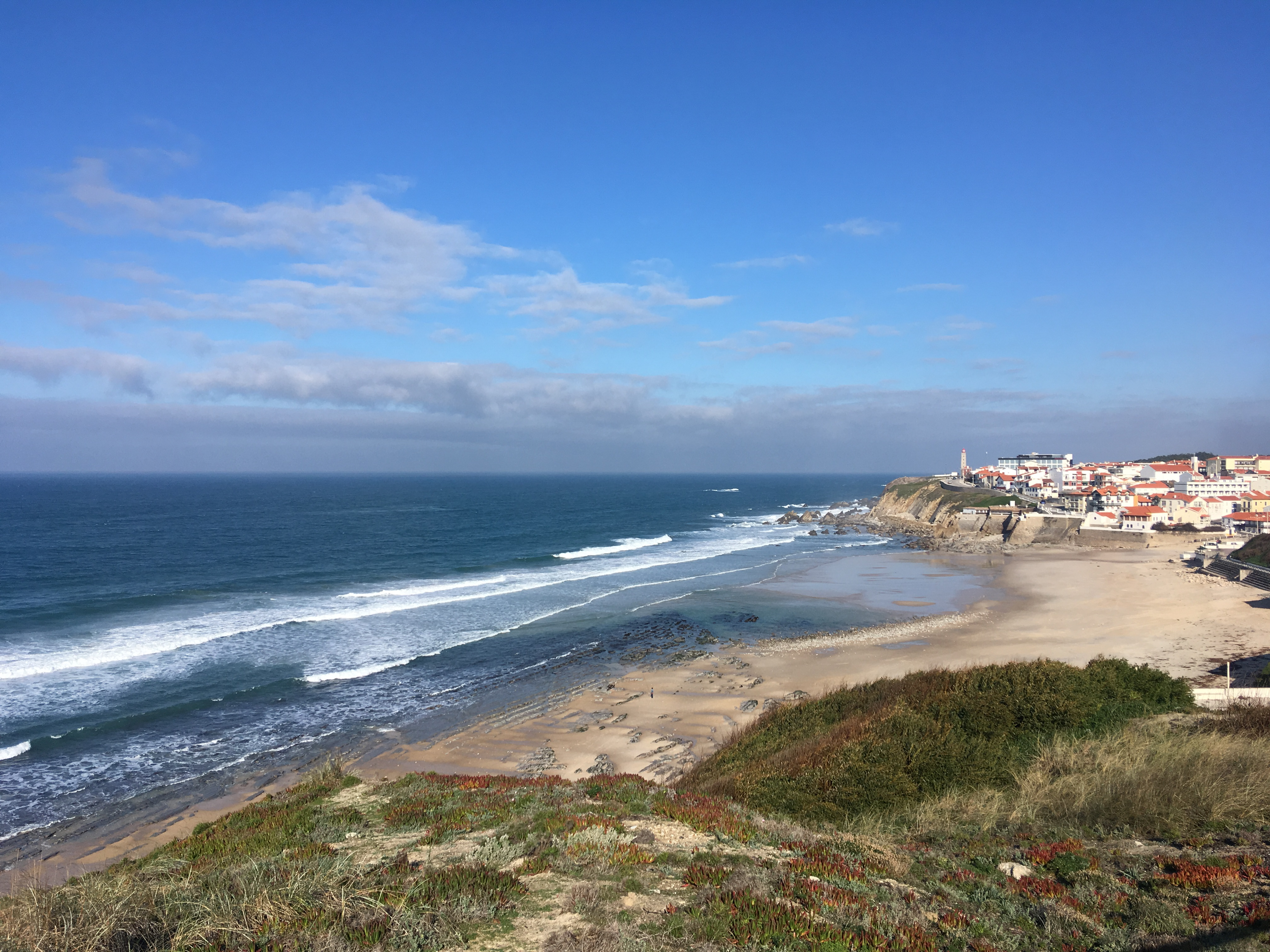
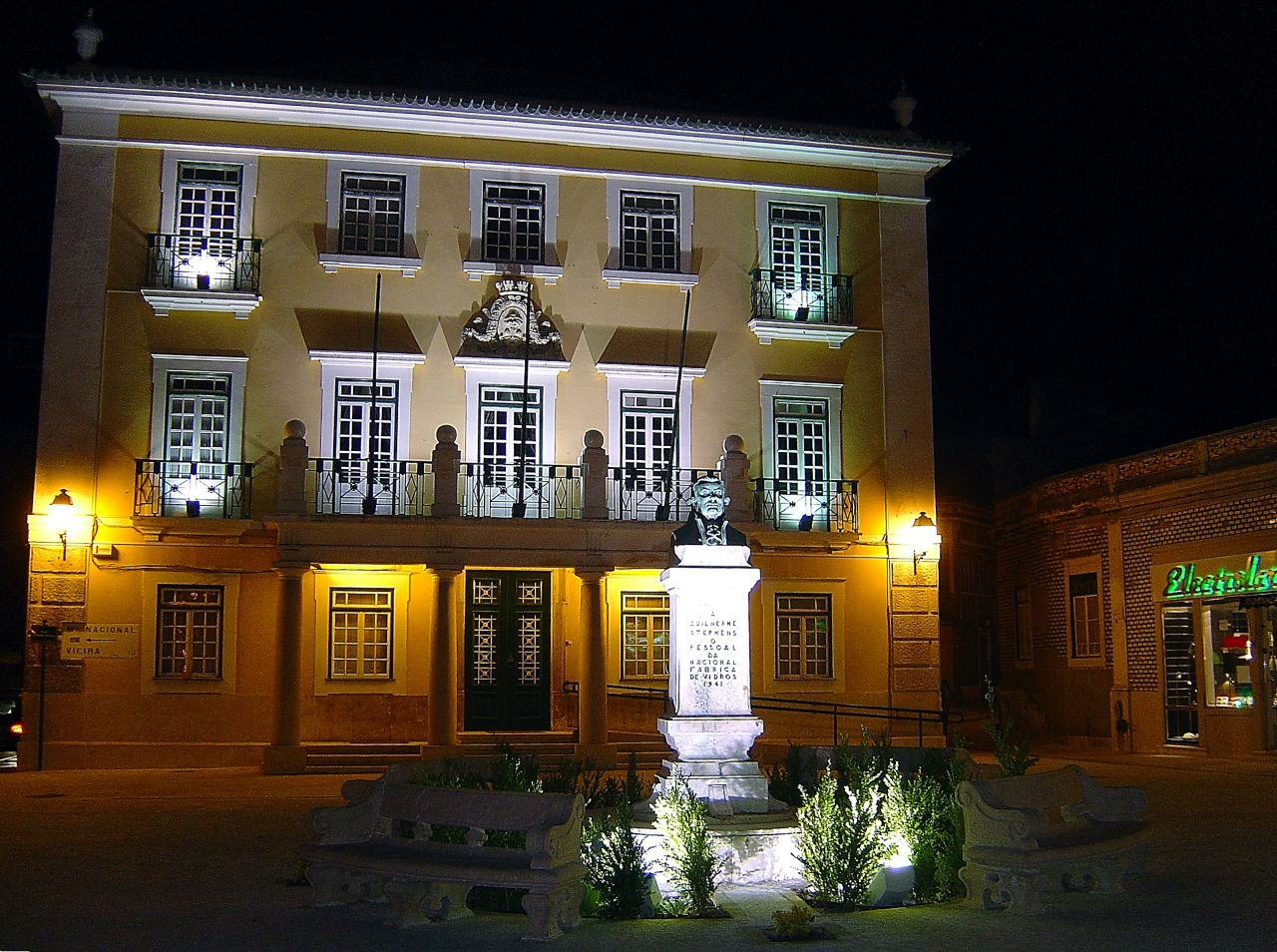
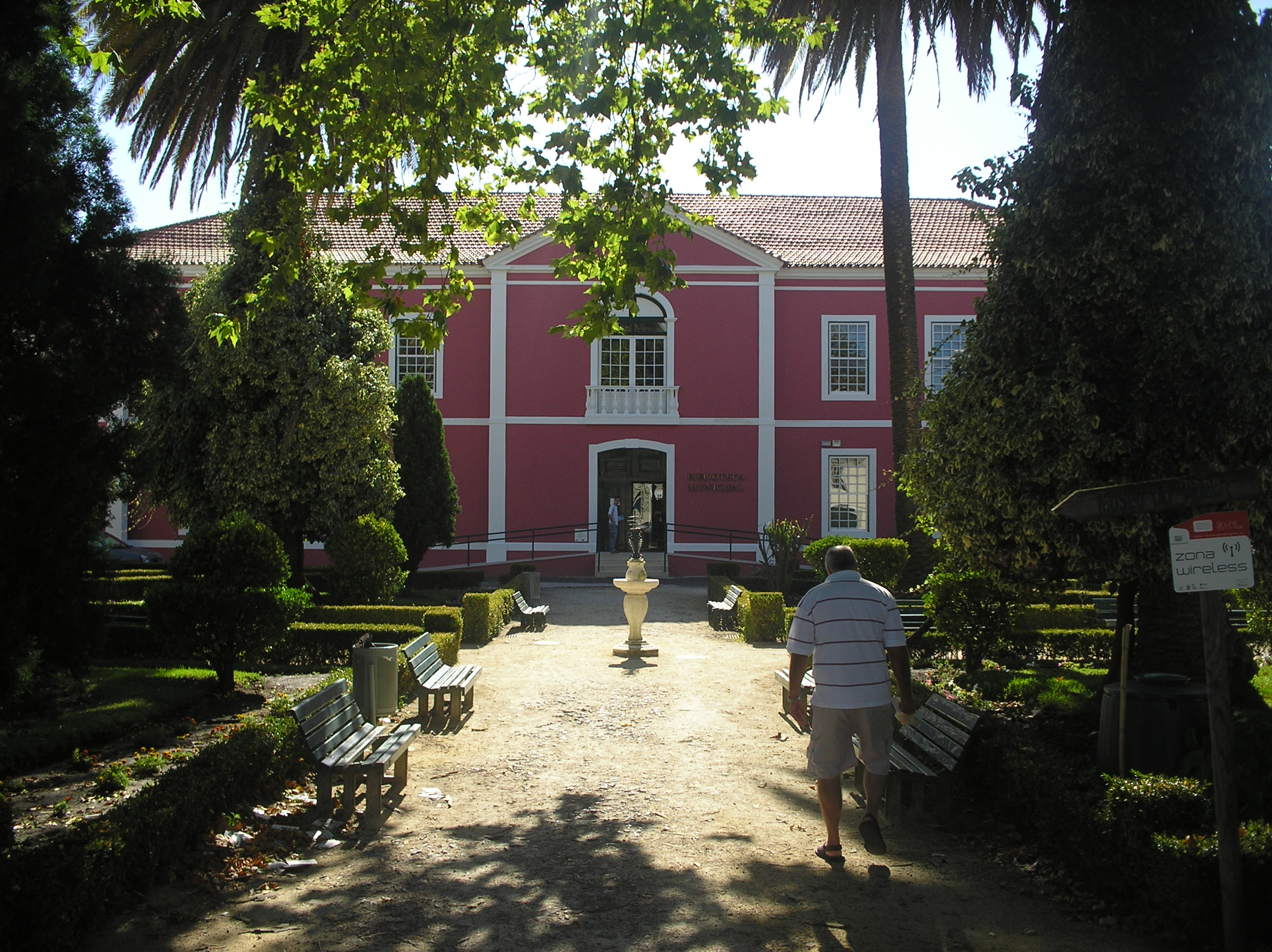

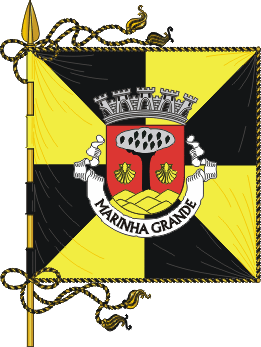
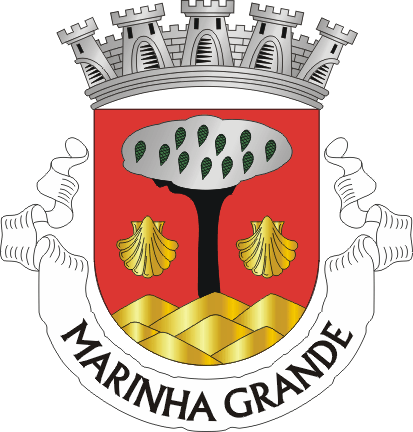
- Flag Coat of arms
- Interactive map of Marinha Grande
- Location in Portugal
- Coordinates: 39°45′N 8°56′W
- Country: Portugal
- Region: Centro
- Intermunic. comm.: Região de Leiria
- District: Leiria
- Parishes: 3

Government
  - President: Paulo Jorge Campos (PS)

Area
  - Total: 187.25 km^{2} (72.30 sq mi)

Population (2021)
  - Total: 39,032
  - Density: 208.45/km^{2} (539.88/sq mi)
- Time zone: UTC+00:00 (WET)
  - Summer (DST): UTC+01:00 (WEST)
- Local holiday: Ascension Day (date varies)
- Website: www.cm-mgrande.pt

Marinha Grande (Portuguese pronunciation: [mɐˈɾiɲɐ ˈɣɾɐ̃dɨ]) is a municipality in the Leiria District, Portugal. The population in 2021 was 39,032, in an area of 187.25 km². The city itself has a population of 32,330.

It is located right in the middle of the 700-year-old Leiria pine forest covering 100 square kilometres, and near excellent beaches such as Praia da Vieira, Nazaré, and São Pedro de Moel.

The present Mayor is Aurélio Ferreira, elected by the independent movement +MPM, a coalition formed by MPM and +Concelho. The municipal holiday is Ascension Day.

== Parishes ==
Administratively, the municipality is divided into 3 civil parishes (freguesias):

- Marinha Grande
- Moita
- Vieira de Leiria

== History ==
The Pinhal de Leiria forest was first planted in the 13th century by Dom Afonso III and expanded by Dom Dinis as a barrier against the sands and to supply timber to the maritime industry. In October 2017, a large-scale forest fire devastated about 86% of the area planted with pine trees. Since there, a lot of efforts promoted by public and private entities have tried to reforest the burned vegetation, but most of the landscape is still ruined.

The Marinha Grande glass manufacturing industry was first established in the middle of the 18th century. The Royal Glass Factory (Real Fabrica de Vidros) was bought by an English entrepreneur William Stephens who developed the factory and the business under the protection of the Marques de Pombal. The wood from the pine forest was used to fuel the factories. The former palatial home of William Stephens now contains the Museu do Vidro da Marinha Grande which houses glassware from the 17th to the 20th century. In 1826, the factory was given to the state and became one of the country's main producers of traditionally made fine crystal.

On 18 January 1934 there was insurrection in several locations of Portugal, in particular Marinha Grande, that aimed at taking down the authoritarian Estado Novo regime. The trigger was legislation in 1933 that dissolved trade unions and banned strikes. The revolts were easily suppressed by the regime. The strikers in Marinha Grande suffered a particularly heavy punishment. When, two years later, the regime inaugurated the Tarrafal prison, in the Portuguese colony of Cape Verde, a third of the early prisoners came from Marinha Grande, and some would eventually die there due to the camp's bad conditions.

In January 2026, Storm Kristin caused a catastrophic impact in the municipality of Marinha Grande, with losses exceeding €143 million.

== Economy ==
Marinha Grande is a major centre of Portugal's glass manufacturing and moulding industries. Approximately 250 companies in the town operate in the moulding sector. Its glassmaking industry has contributed to the use of the nickname "Crystal City."

The city is served by two highways (A8 connecting to Lisbon and A17 connecting to Aveiro and Oporto) and a train line. It is a 1-hour 15-minute drive away from Lisbon, 10 minutes away from Leiria and 45 minutes from Coimbra.

== Tourism ==
The pine forest is an aromatic forest and has waymarked paths for walkers. It has several campsites within it. There is a cycle route from Marinha Grande to São Pedro de Moel on the coast. There are tours around the glass works and to the glass museums.

== Sports ==
Atlético Clube Marinhense is the local team, it plays at Estádio Municipal da Marinha Grande, a venue shared in past with former Primeira Liga club, U.D. Leiria.

== Notable people ==
- William Stephens (1731–1803) an English entrepreneur and glass manufacturer, he reopened and operated the royal glassworks factory in Marinha Grande; it had fallen into disuse.
- José Gregório (1908-1961) a glassmaker in Marinha Grande, a trade unionist and Portuguese Communist Party activist.
- António Garrido (1932–2014) a Portuguese football referee.
- Orlando Gonçalves (born 1938) a Portuguese wrestler, competed at the 1960 and 1972 Summer Olympics
- Margarida Balseiro Lopes (born 1989) a Portuguese politician, a deputy in the Assembly of the Republic of Portugal
- Hugo Gaspar (born 1982 in Vieira de Leiria) a Portuguese volleyball player
