= Tim Edwards (artist) =

Australian glass artist (born 1967)

Tim Edwards (born 1967) is an Australian glass artist based in Adelaide, South Australia. He works at JamFactory and at his home studio with fellow glass artist and life partner Clare Belfrage.

== Early life and education ==
Tim Edwards was born in 1967 in Millicent, South Australia.

In 1988 he started studying at Deakin University's art school in Warrnambool, where he graduated in 1990 with a Bachelor of Arts (Applied Art) degree, with major studies in ceramics and sculpture. In 1991 he received a graduate diploma in ceramics from the University of Tasmania in Hobart.

In 1992 he trained in ceramics with Stephen Bowers, before completing a traineeship in glass art with Nick Mount in 1996 (becoming the first artist in the JamFactory's history to undertake a second traineeship).

He has also undertaken training at the Pilchuck Glass School in Washington, US.

== Career ==
Edwards worked as an artist at Blue Pony studio in Adelaide from 2001 to 2008.

He is closely affiliated with JamFactory, and as of 2022 is senior technician and artist at its Glass Studio.

From December 2024 to March 2025, his work was exhibited in a major JamFactory exhibition called Gathering Light, which was developed to coincide with Chihuly in the Botanic Garden, an outdoor exhibition of the work of Seattle glass artist Dale Chihuly in the Adelaide Botanic Garden. The exhibition also celebrated 50 years of glassblowing at JamFactory and the connections between the glass art communities of Adelaide and Seattle, in particular the Pilchuck Glass School. The work of six glass artists were displayed, the other five being Nick Mount, Liam Fleming, Kristel Britcher, Clare Belfrage, and Jessica Murtagh.

== Practice ==
Observing natural objects, shapes, and patterns, Edwards draws in lead pencil or black pen, planning glass forms in the drawings. He first blows or shapes his work in the hot shop, and then carves, cuts or grinds the glass, using a lathe with diamond and stone wheels. He mostly creates vessels.

He has said:

I am interested in the way things are seen and perceived. This becomes even more curious when there is some form of deception – that tug of war between seeing and knowing. For years I've looked at the way objects are rendered in the mediums of film, animation, comics and graphic novels. These varying graphic qualities feed into both my drawing and glassmaking.

For his 2022 prize-winning work Ellipse #8, he first spent about two hours blowing the piece, with help from assistants at JamFactory's Glass Studio. It then took him around 35 hours in his home studio "grinding perfect ovals out of the glass using high-end German stone and diamond tools".

== Teaching and other activities ==
Edwards has taught in the United States at the Pilchuck Glass School, as well as the Haystack Mountain School of Crafts in Maine, and Ohio State University, where he was Scholar in Residence.

He has also written a number of articles and essays, which have been published in books and journals such as New Glass Review.

== Recognition and awards ==
- 1997: Scholarship, Pilchuck Glass School, Washington, US
- 1997: First prize, Barbara Wallace Memorial Exhibition, South Australia
- 2004: Short Notice Grant to attend SOFA Chicago (Sculpture Objects Functional Art and Design), from Arts South Australia
- 2006: Rakow Commission from the Corning Museum of Glass (the second Australian to receive this major award)
- 2007: Artist-in-residence at the Tacoma Museum of Glass.
- 2018: A featured artist in the 2018 Adelaide Biennial, Divided Worlds
- 2022: Tom Malone Prize, at the Art Gallery of Western Australia, for his work entitled Ellipse #8.

In addition, Edwards has received a number of grants from the Australia Council and Arts SA.

== Personal life ==
Edwards is married to Clare Belfrage, who is also an internationally acclaimed glass artist, and they have two sons. They share a home studio in the Adelaide suburb of Kensington.

== Selected exhibitions ==
=== Group ===
Edwards' work has been exhibited in numerous group exhibitions, including:

- 1993: New Issues, Anima Gallery, Melbourne
- 1997: Barbara Wallace Memorial Exhibition, Millicent Craft Centre, Millicent, South Australia
- 2002: Australian Glass, Mitukoshi International Glass Art Festival, Taiwan
- 2004: Clare Belfrage and Tim Edwards, Recent Works in Glass, Foster/White Gallery, Seattle
- 2008: Duologue, a two-person show with Clare Belfrage at JamFactory, Adelaide
- 2009: Limited Lines, Canberra Glassworks, Canberra
- 2018: Divided Worlds: Adelaide Biennial at the Art Gallery of South Australia, Adelaide
- SOFA Chicago (several times)
- Adrian Sassoon galleries around the world (several)
- Traver Gallery in Seattle, US (several times)

=== Solo ===
- 2002: Tim Edwards, JamFactory, Adelaide
- 2004: BMG Art, Adelaide
- 2008: Wexler Gallery, Philadelphia, US
- 2016: A Journal, Sabbia Gallery, Sydney
- 2018: Seeing and Knowing, Traver Gallery, Seattle, US
- 2021: Elements, Sabbia Gallery, Sydney
- 2022: Perception Deception, in the Phone Booths at the Adelaide Railway Station
- 2024: Gathering Light

== Collections ==
=== Australia ===
- Art Gallery of South Australia, Adelaide
- Art Gallery of Western Australia, Perth
- National Art Glass Collection, Wagga Wagga, New South Wales
- National Gallery of Australia, Canberra
- National Gallery of Victoria, Melbourne

=== Elsewhere ===
- Corning Museum of Glass, Corning, New York state, US
- Museum of Glass, Tacoma, Washington, US
