= Liam Fleming =

Australian glass artist (born 1989)

- Born: 1989 (age 35–36); Adelaide, Australia
- Education: University of South Australia, JamFactory
- Known for: Glass art, glass sculpture
- Notable work: Transitory series
- Awards: Tom Malone Glass Art Prize (2023)

Liam Fleming (born 1989) is an Australian glass artist based in Adelaide, where he works in JamFactory's glass studio. He is known for his colourful distorted rectangular shaped glass sculptures, and his work has been exhibited around Australia and internationally.

== Early life and education ==
Liam Fleming was born in Adelaide, South Australia, in 1989. He was fascinated by glass from a young age, and was inspired after seeing a glass exhibition in Canberra as a child.

Aged 16, Fleming did some work experience at a glass studio, and then took glassblowing classes at the University of South Australia as part of its visual arts program, which he graduated from in 2011. He regularly visited the JamFactory while a student, and completed the studio's glass training program there in 2012.

== Career ==
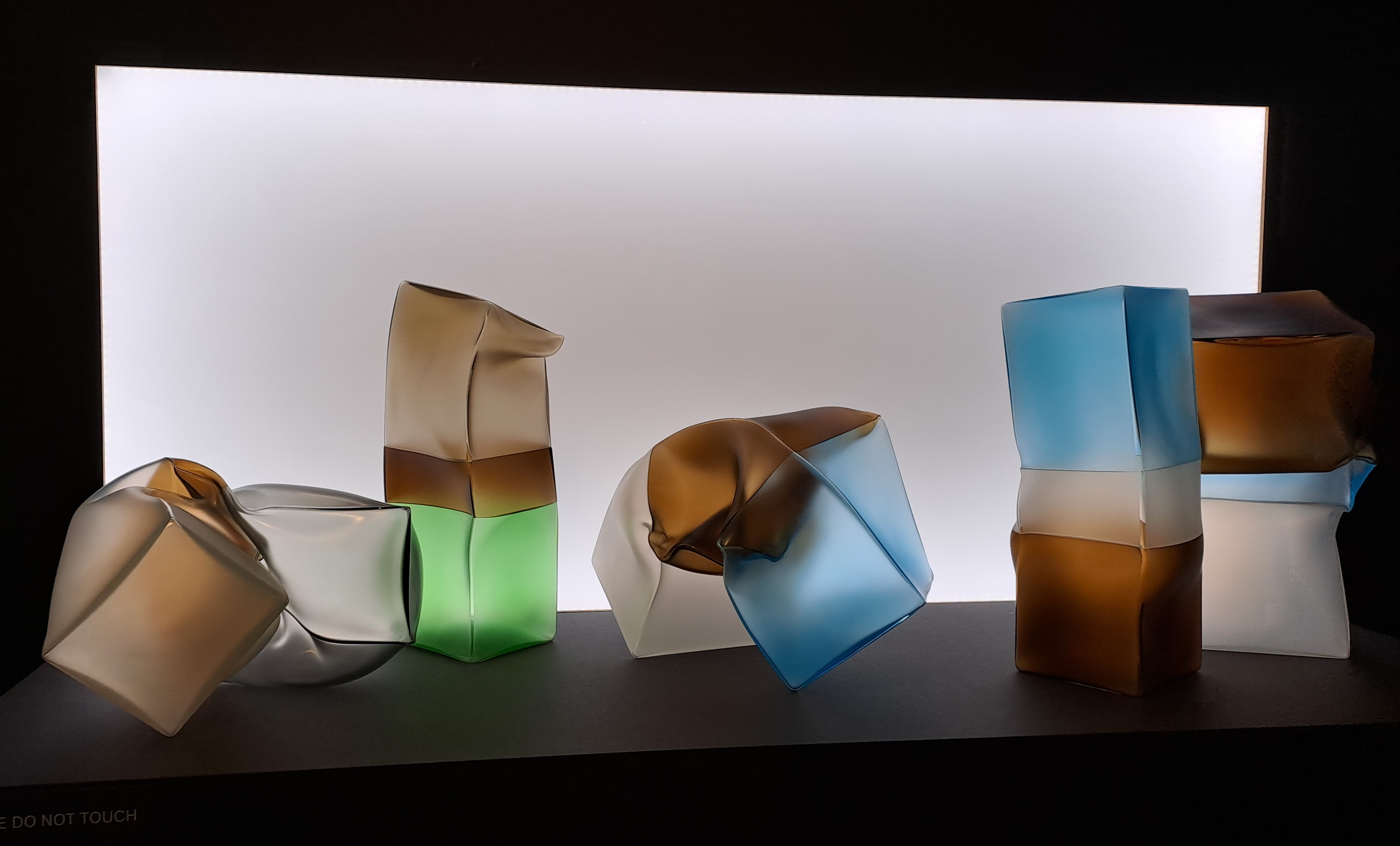
Transitory Series, 2025

Fleming has assisted glass artists Danielle Rickaby and Jaan Poldaas at JamFactory.

He is known for his coloured rectangular and cube-shaped works. He creates metal moulds in rectangular square shapes, creates prisms from them, and then blows these into varied shapes and sizes. He has said that his works are "completely non-representational", and his aims for a type of "response art", somewhat akin to modernist painters such as American artist Frank Stella. He is inspired by ceramic artists Kenneth Price and Ron Nagle, as well as famous American glass artist Dale Chihuly. He uses two very precise techniques, mould-blowing and cold lamination, and then fusing his creations at high temperatures in a kiln, joining objects in an imprecise way; the glass "slumps and warps, collapses under its weight, and expands with pressure". His work "explores the complicated relationship between craft, art, design and architecture".

Fleming has created works for the Pilchuck Glass School in Washington, US; the International Glass Art Society conference in Venice, Italy, where he was an invited speaker and demonstrator; and the Australasian Glass Conference in Whanganui, New Zealand.

He was production design manager for the JamFactory's glass studio for a number of years years.

As of 2025, Fleming is working as a studio technician at JamFactory. In 2024, he was also doing work with an Art Gallery of South Australia (AGSA) collection, and was planning to help resurrect the Eamonn Vereker glassblowing studio in Norwood.

== Recognition and awards ==
Fleming has undertaken artist residencies in Delhi, India; Oaxaca, Mexico; Murano, Italy; and Seattle, US, and has been the recipient of many grants and scholarships, including a full scholarship to attend Pilchuck Glass School in 2018, and an Art Gallery of South Australia bursary in 2020. In 2021, Fleming was the recipient of the Guildhouse Fellowship, which offers $35,000 to support research and development, including the creation of new work. The new work, entitled Light and Colour, was displayed at the gallery from 1 September – 3 December 2023.

In 2022, he was appointed artist in residence at Canberra Glassworks. In June 2025, Fleming was featured in British design magazine Wallpaper's list of 20 emerging designers worldwide.

He has been nominated for or won a number of awards, including:

- 2018: Finalist, Fuse Glass Prize
- 2019: Finalist, Tom Malone Glass Art Prize, Perth, Western Australia
- 2020: Finalist, The Design Files + Laminex Design Awards, Handcrafted category, for Graft Vase Series
- 2021: Finalist, The Design Files + Laminex Design Awards, Handcrafted category, for Post-Production
- 2021: Finalist, Ramsay Art Prize at the Art Gallery of South Australia, for Post-Production
- 2022: Finalist, Fuse Glass Prize
- 2023: Tom Malone Glass Art Prize, Perth, Western Australia
- 2025: Finalist, Ramsay Art Prize

== Exhibitions ==
Fleming's work has been exhibited widely, both in Australia and internationally. It features annually in Melbourne Design Week, and has been exhibited in London Design Week, Milan Design Week, and during Australia Now in Berlin, Germany.

In October to November 2022, a solo exhibition of his work, entitled Falling into Space, was displayed at the UNSW Galleries, in Sydney.

He was one of seven artists whose work was exhibited in the Gathering Light exhibition in 2024, along with Nick Mount, Tim Edwards, Clare Belfrage, Jessica Murtagh, and Kristel Britcher.

In 2025, he was selected to exhibit at the Triennale di Milano. In August 2025, he had his debut solo exhibition in Melbourne, at Tolarno Galleries, comprising 12 new works and titled Glass in 12 Parts.

== Collections ==
- Art Gallery of South Australia, Adelaide
- Artbank, Sydney
- National Gallery of Victoria, Melbourne
- Parliament House, Canberra (Transitory Form #4)
- Powerhouse Parramatta (Transitory Form #47)
