= Jenni Kemarre Martiniello =

Australian artist (born 1949-)

Jenni Kemarre Martiniello OAM (born 1949) is an Australian Aboriginal (Arrernte) glass artist. She is best known for making glass vessels inspired by woven forms traditionally made by Indigenous peoples. She is also known for her advocacy for and support of Indigenous artists.

== Early life ==
Martiniello was born in Adelaide, Australia. Her father was of Aboriginal and Chinese descent, and her mother, a mezzo-soprano and accomplished pianist, was of Anglo-Celtic descent. They met while working at John Martin's and got married, a potentially controversial union for a mixed-race couple at the time.

Martiniello had an early interest in art. While in high school, she took night classes at the Adelaide School of Art. However, after she graduated from high school, she decided to join the navy. She spent two years in the service, first as a radar plotter and later as a weapons assessor. She eventually left, dissatisfied with the way service members were treated. She then met and married her husband, an Italian migrant, and they settled in Canberra in the late 1960s. The two had multiple children together, but ended up getting a divorce ten years into their relationship.

After her divorce, Martiniello returned to school, this time studying sculpture at the Canberra School of Art (now the Australian National University School of Art and Design). While there, she experimented with many different mediums, including drawing, printmaking, and photography. She graduated with a Bachelor of Arts degree in 1985, then studied philosophy and art history (also at ANU).

== Career ==
=== Teaching and writing ===
Martiniello taught professional and community education at the University of Canberra, and Indigenous art history at the Yurauna Centre (part of the Canberra Institute of Technology). During this time she continued sculpting and drawing.

In 1999, Martiniello founded the ACT Indigenous Writers Group. She published several volumes of poetry, and in 2003 she was named an ACT Creative Arts Fellow for Literature.

=== Advocacy and education ===
In 2003, Martiniello and fellow artist Lyndy Delian founded the Indigenous Textiles and Glass Artists (ITAG) organization. The group advocates for Indigenous artists and helps them connect with other arts organisations. They help to mitigate any barriers due to historic colonization and discrimination of indigenous peoples. ITAG also hosts exhibitions and offers workshops for artists. Martiniello and Delian have also collaborated to create the Honouring Cultures program, which, in partnership with Canberra Glassworks, gives regional artists the chance to develop their glassmaking skills and international artists the opportunity to participate in skills exchange and collaborative work programs.

Martiniello founded Kemarre Arts in 2006. It was the Australian Capital Territory's first "independent Aboriginal-run social enterprise." The organisation supports artists in many ways, including through: grant writing, professional development programs, publishing, and product and pricing guidance. In 2012, Kemarre Arts won the ACT NAIDOC Award for Most Outstanding Agency.

=== Glassmaking ===
Martiniello first began to work in the medium of glass alongside Delian in 2008. They applied for a grant to teach indigenous artists glassmaking through a series of workshops at Canberra Glassworks, and were able to learn skills alongside roughly 20 other artists.

In 2011, Martiniello was an artist-in-residence at the Thomas Foundation. While there, she began experimenting with weaving patterns in glass. She took her inspiration from the Aboriginal tradition of weaving. As a child she had seen woven vessels such as fish traps and bags in museums, displayed as if they were "relics from a dead past of extinct cultural practices.” She was also able to watch women, including her Arrante grandmother, weave items such as eel traps, fish traps, dilly bags, bicornual baskets, and message sticks.

Martiniello combines this childhood inspiration with her newer knowledge of glass, using the Venetian technique of canework to imitate woven forms in glass. She experiments with colours to achieve a palette with references from the Australian landscape. She works with a team of people to realise her pieces, which continues a practice common among glass artists and also parallels Indigenous weaving circles. In both cases these groups of artists pass knowledge and skills down to the younger generation through demonstration and experience.

In 2013, Martiniello was awarded the National Aboriginal & Torres Strait Islander Art Award for her piece Golden Brown Reeds Fish Trap. The Australian award is the most prestigious prize for Indigenous art. The piece was inspired by woven fish traps from northeast Arnhem Land and Cape York, and took a team of seven artists to make.

Other selected awards and honors include the Canberra Critics Circle Award for Visual Arts (2011, 2013), the Wollotuka Acquisitive Art Prize (University of Newcastle, 2012), the Aboriginal and Torres Strait Islander Arts Visual Arts Fellowship (2013-2015), and the Bay of Fires Art Prize (2016).

She was awarded the Medal of the Order of Australia (OAM) in the 2022 Queen's Birthday Honours.

Her work is in several major collections, including the National Gallery of Australia, the National Museum of Australia, the Canberra Museum and Gallery, the Tasmanian Museum and Art Gallery, the Australian Parliament House Collection, the National Art Glass Gallery, the Belau National Museum, the Corning Museum of Glass, the Kluge-Ruhe Aboriginal Art Collection of the University of Virginia, and the British Museum.
