= Adrian Sassoon =

British art dealer and gallerist

- Born: February 1961 (age 65)
- Education: Eton College; Christie's Education
- Occupations: Art dealer and gallerist
- Years active: 1980–present
- Family: Sassoon family

Adrian Sassoon (born February 1961) is an English art dealer, art collector and writer. He was schooled at Eton College, where he was taught ceramics by Gordon Baldwin; and then went on to study further at Christie's Education. He worked as an assistant curator at the Getty Museum in the department of decorative arts. He is the owner and founder of Adrian Sassoon Ltd., a gallery specialising in contemporary art, and 18th-century French porcelain. From 2024, his gallery for contemporary art has been based in Belgravia, London.

== Early life and education ==
Sassoon has stated in interviews that he grew up in a family that had a strong appreciation for art and was therefore interested in it from a young age. He was schooled at Sunningdale School and Eton College, where he was taught ceramics by Gordon Baldwin.

He became fascinated with collecting art and began to do so while still a teenager.

== Career ==
Sassoon began his career working at the Getty Museum at the age of 19. He worked as a junior curator specialising in 18th-century French works of art. This speciality has remained with Sassoon throughout his career. After working at the Getty Museum in Los Angeles, Sassoon moved to London to work with a prominent art dealer, who was known for selling 17th & 18th-century decorative arts to American museums. In 1991, he authored the Getty Museum catalogue of Vincennes and Sèvres porcelain.

By 1992, Sassoon had amassed a collection of Vincennes ceramics from the 18th century. Apart from a handful of pieces, he sold the collection in the early 1990s to the Sèvres - Manufacture et Musée nationaux when he first went it alone as a prominent dealer in this field. Since selling his first Vincennes collection, over the subsequent decades he formed another collection of the same early French porcelain. Twenty pieces of this second collection were on loan for five years at the Getty Museum from 2018 to 2023.

A number of pieces in Sassoon's art collection have been displayed in museums around the world. He is also known to be a collector of various French 18th-century works of art and pastels, photography of his own generation, sculptures by Hiroshi Suzuki, a leading contemporary silversmith, as well as other contemporary works of art. Sassoon curated a selection of contemporary ceramics and silver in Inspired by Chatsworth for Sotheby's New York exhibition in 2019 in association with The Chatsworth Estate. During the same year, it was announced that three works by Dame Magdalene Odundo from Sassoon's collection were on display at The Hepworth Wakefield.

Since the mid-1990s, Sassoon has represented a number of established artists working in ceramics, glass, gold, silver, lacquer and hardstones, and is most widely known as a leading art dealer in this field. Kate Malone, Hiroshi Suzuki, Elizabeth Fritsch, Felicity Aylieff, Junko Mori, Hitomi Hosono, Clare Belfrage, Stephen Cox, Bouke de Vries, Pippin Drysdale, Tim Edwards, Ndidi Ekubia, Hans Kotter, and Takahiro Kondo are among the artists represented by Sassoon. Sassoon shows works by the artists he represents at international art and design fairs, including TEFAF Maastricht, TEFAF New York, Design Miami, as well as Treasure House Fair in London and PAD London.

In 2007, Sassoon was appointed as a trustee of The Wallace Collection, holding the position until 2015. From 2013 to 2019, Sassoon served as a trustee of The Silver Trust in London, which provided a collection of contemporary British silver for the use of the Prime Minister at Number 10 Downing Street.

In 2013, Sassoon authored a monograph for The Metropolitan Museum of Art, New York, on JAR, the leading contemporary jewellery designer Joel A. Rosenthal.

During the COVID-19 pandemic, in 2020, Sassoon held The London House of Modernity exhibition in collaboration with Modernity where contemporary works of art were exhibited in an 18th-century London townhouse. In 2021, Sassoon organised an online exhibition at Parham House and Gardens, an Elizabethan house in Sussex recorded by filmmaker Freddie Leyden.

He is currently a member of the International Council of The Metropolitan Museum of Art in New York. In 2024, he became a trustee of The Attingham Trust and he has also been a member of committees of the patrons' groups for The Wallace Collection in London and The Fitzwilliam Museum in Cambridge. Sassoon supports the publication of catalogues associated with museum exhibitions at The Wallace Collection in London, The National Gallery in London and The Metropolitan Museum of Art in New York.

== Personal life ==
Sassoon was born in London and is a member of the Sassoon family, the son of Hugh Meyer Sassoon (first cousin of Siegfried Sassoon) and Marion (née Schiff); he is the great-great-grandson of Sassoon David Sassoon. He is married to Edmund Burke, a descendant of politician and philosopher Edmund Burke.

== Articles and essays ==
- Vincennes and Sèvres Porcelain from a European Private Collection, International Ceramics Fair & Seminar, 2001

== Books ==
- Decorative Arts: A Handbook of the Collections of the J. Paul Getty Museum. 1986.
- Vincennes and Sèvres Porcelain: Catalogue of the Collections of the J. Paul Getty Museum. 1991.
- Jewels by JAR. The Metropolitan Museum of Art, New York, 2013.
- Sassoon, Adrian. Foreword. Colin Reid: Glass Sculpture, edited by Clare Beck and Kathleen Slater. Lund Humphries, 2013.
- Sassoon, Adrian. Foreword. Kate Malone: Inspired by Waddesdon. London: Adrian Sassoon, 2016.
- Sassoon, Adrian. “The Classic Qualities of Excellence.” Kondo Takahiro: Vessel, Body, Void. Mitsumura Suiko Shoin, Japan, 2022.
- Sassoon, Adrian. Foreword. Force of Nature: The Art of Kate Malone, edited by Mark Piolet, Kathleen Slater, and Andrew Wicks. Skira, 2024.
- Sassoon, Adrian. Foreword. Expressions in Blue: Monumental Porcelain by Felicity Aylieff, edited by Mark Piolet, Kathleen Slater, and Andrew Wicks. Royal Botanic Gardens, Kew, Surrey, 2024.
- Sassoon, Adrian. “Memory Vessels.” Bouke de Vries: UNBROKEN. Waanders Publishers, Netherlands, 2025.
