= Tim Edwards =

Tim or Timothy Edwards may refer to:

- Tim Edwards (cricketer, born 1974), English cricketer, played for Worcestershire and for Somerset
- Jesse E. James (1875–1951), only surviving son of American outlaw Jesse James, who went by the name Tim Edwards in his youth
- Tim Edwards (artist) (born 1967), Australian glass artist
- Tim Edwards (gridiron football) (born 1968), American football defensive tackle
- Timothy Edwards (cricketer, born 1958), English cricketer, played for Cambridge University Cricket Club
