= Hitomi Hosono =

Hitomi Hosono career

- Born: 1978, Gifu Prefecture, Japan
- Education: Kanazawa College of Art, Kanazawa, Japan, BA (Hons) Ceramics Danmarks Designskole, Copenhagen, Denmark, Ceramics Design Course Royal College of Art, London, MA Ceramics and Glass

Hitomi Hosono is a London-based ceramicist who won the inaugural Perrier-Jouët Arts Salon Prize. She is known for intricate ceramic pieces that are inspired by botanical studies and her memories of the Japanese landscape and the greenery of East London.

== Education and career ==
Hitomi Hosono was born in 1978 in Gifu Prefecture in Japan. She attended the Kanazawa College of Art in Kanazawa, Japan from 1998 to 2002 where she studied Kutani Pottery. She attended the Ceramics Design Course at the Danmarks Designskole in Copenhagen from 2005 to 2006, and received a Master of Arts in Ceramics and Glass from the Royal College of Art in London in 2009. She was an Artist in Residence at Wedgwood from 2017 to 2018.

Her signature style is inspired by Wedgwood Jasperware and consists of creating original sprig models and plaster moulds based on botanical examples which she then applies in layers onto a pottery base. She layers the leaves on top of the base until it is hidden creating highly decorative vessels. Pieces can take years to create. She also adds sprigs and carved leaves to ceramic boxes that have been gilded on the inside.

Hosono is represented exclusively by Adrian Sassoon, London.

== Selected group and solo exhibitions ==
2023 Inspired by Lanhydrock: ceramics, botany with artist, Hitomi Hosono, Lanhydrock, Bodmin, Cornwall in association with Adrian Sassoon

2023 On the Surface: Flora Inspired Ceramics of Hitomi Hosono, Minnesota Marine Art Museum, Minnesota, USA in association with Adrian Sassoon

2017 Hitomi Hosono, The Daiwa Anglo-Japanese Foundation, London

2015 Brook Street: An Artist’s Eye, Sibyl Colefax & John Fowler, London in association with Adrian Sassoon

2013 Perrier-Jouët Arts Salon, St. Pancras Renaissance Hotel Chambers Club, London

== Work in collections ==
Aberdeen Art Gallery & Museums, Aberdeen

Oriental Museum, Durham University, Durham

The British Museum, London

The Wedgwood Museum, Stoke-on-Trent

Victoria and Albert Museum, London

Musée national des arts asiatiques – Guimet, Paris, France

Porzellanikon – Staatliches Museum für Porzellan, Selb, Germany

Cooper-Hewitt, National Design Museum, New York, USA

Indianapolis Museum of Art, Indianapolis, IN, USA

Los Angeles County Museum of Art, Los Angeles, CA, USA

== Awards ==
2014 Winner, Jerwood Makers Open, Jerwood Visual Arts, London

2013 Winner, Perrier-Jouët Arts Salon Prize, London

2004 First Prize, Graphic Art on Ceramics, Museum of Modern Ceramic Art, Tajimi, Japan

2004 Silver Prize, Craft Design

2004 Tajim, Museum of Modern Ceramic Art, Tajimii, Japan

2004 Hokuriku Broadcast President`s Prize, Daiwa Department Store, Kanazawa, Japan

2004 Utatsuyama Craft Workshop Purchase Award, Kanazawa, Japan

2003 Utatsuyama Craft Workshop Purchase Award, Kanazawa, Japan
