= Norio Azuma =

Japanese-American painter, serigraph artist

- Azuma in 1968
- Born: November 28, 1928; Kii-Nagashima, Mie, Japan
- Died: February 4, 2004 (aged 75)
- Education: Kanazawa College of Art; Chouinard Art Institute; Art Students League of New York
- Known for: abstract painting, printmaking

Norio Azuma (Japanese: 東 典男, November 28, 1928 – February 4, 2004) was a Japanese American painter and serigraph artist who worked in a modernist style. His career spanned several decades and he exhibited widely across the United States and internationally. Azuma’s work is characterized by his refined technical skill and frequent exploration of the human figure, particularly in etching and print media.

== Early life and education ==
Azuma was born in Japan in Kii-Nagashima, Mie.

Azuma attended Kanazawa College of Art in Kanazawa, Ishikawa, Japan. He went on to study at the Chouinard Art Institute and continued his education at the Art Students League of New York.

Azuma was born in Japan in 1928 and began his formal art education at Kanazawa Art College, where he studied from 1948 to 1953. He was selected for the Japan Art Exhibition at the Tokyo Museum of Art multiple times between 1951 and 1953. In 1955, he emigrated to the United States and became a permanent resident. He continued his education at the Chouinard Art Institute in Los Angeles from 1955 to 1957, and subsequently at the Art Students League of New York from 1957 to 1959.

== Career and Exhibitions ==
Azuma is known for his printmaking, primarily in serigraphy. He has exhibited his work internationally, in venues such as the Tokyo Modern Museum of Art, the Corcoran Gallery of Art, and the Whitney Museum of American Art.

The artist died in New York on February 4, 2004.

Azuma was highly active in the American art scene from the 1960s through the 1970s. He participated in numerous solo and group exhibitions, including:

- One-man shows at venues such as the Print Club of Philadelphia, Benjamin Gallery in Chicago, Associated American Artists Gallery in New York, and others in San Francisco, Los Angeles, Des Moines, and Boston.
- Participation in prominent group exhibitions including:
  1. Northwest Printmakers International Print Show (1960)
  2. American Color Print Society Exhibitions (1960, 1961, 1963)
  3. Boston Printmakers Exhibition (1964)
  4. 30 Contemporary American Print Show by the U.S.I.A. (1964)
  5. 3rd International Triennial of Original Graphic Art, Grenchen, Switzerland (1964)
  6. “American Art Today” at the 1965 New York World’s Fair
  7. Exhibition of Japanese Artists Abroad at the National Museum of Modern Art, Tokyo (1965)
  8. “Contemporary American Artists in the White House” exhibition (1966)
  9. “Sculpture & Prints” at the Whitney Museum of American Art (1966)

== Awards and honors ==
Throughout his career, Azuma received numerous awards, including:

- Awards from the Northwest Printmakers International Exhibition (1960)
- Multiple honors from the American Color Print Society
- Prizes from the Butler Institute of American Art (1961)
- Bradley Print Show (1962)
- Emily Lowe Competition (1962)
- Potsdam State University (1963)
- Print Club Expert Choice Show (1963)
- Boston Printmakers (1964, 1968)
- Festival of Art at Western Michigan University (1964)
- Recognition from Library of Congress and other institutions

== Collections ==
Four of his works are held by the Smithsonian American Art Museum in Washington, D.C. His work is also held by other museums including the National Gallery of Art the Brooklyn Museum, the Whitney Museum, the McNay Art Museum the Indianapolis Museum of Art, the Seattle Art Museum, among other institutions.

Azuma’s works are held in numerous prestigious public and private collections, including:

- Brooklyn Museum
- Seattle Art Museum
- Cleaveland Museum of Art
- Philbrook Museum of Art
- Butler Institute of American Art
- Smithsonian Institution
- Library of Congress
- Philadelphia Museum of Art
- St. Louis Art Museum
- National Museum of Modern Art, Tokyo
- Chouinard Art Institute
- Art Institute of Chicago
- University of Nebraska
- Princeton University
- University of California, Berkeley
- Des Moines Art Center
- Boston Public Library
- National Academy of Science
- IBM Corporation
- U.S. Embassies
- U.S. Information Agency

== Affiliations ==
Azuma was actively involved with the Society of American Graphic Artists (SAGA) and was on the council in 1971. He exhibited widely under the sponsorship of organizations such as the American Federation of Arts and the U.S. Information Agency.

== Legacy ==
Norio Azuma’s work continues to be celebrated for its technical mastery and contribution to American and international printmaking. His career bridged Eastern and Western art traditions, and he played a significant role in the mid-20th-century American art scene.
