= Janna Watson =

Canadian painter and textile artist

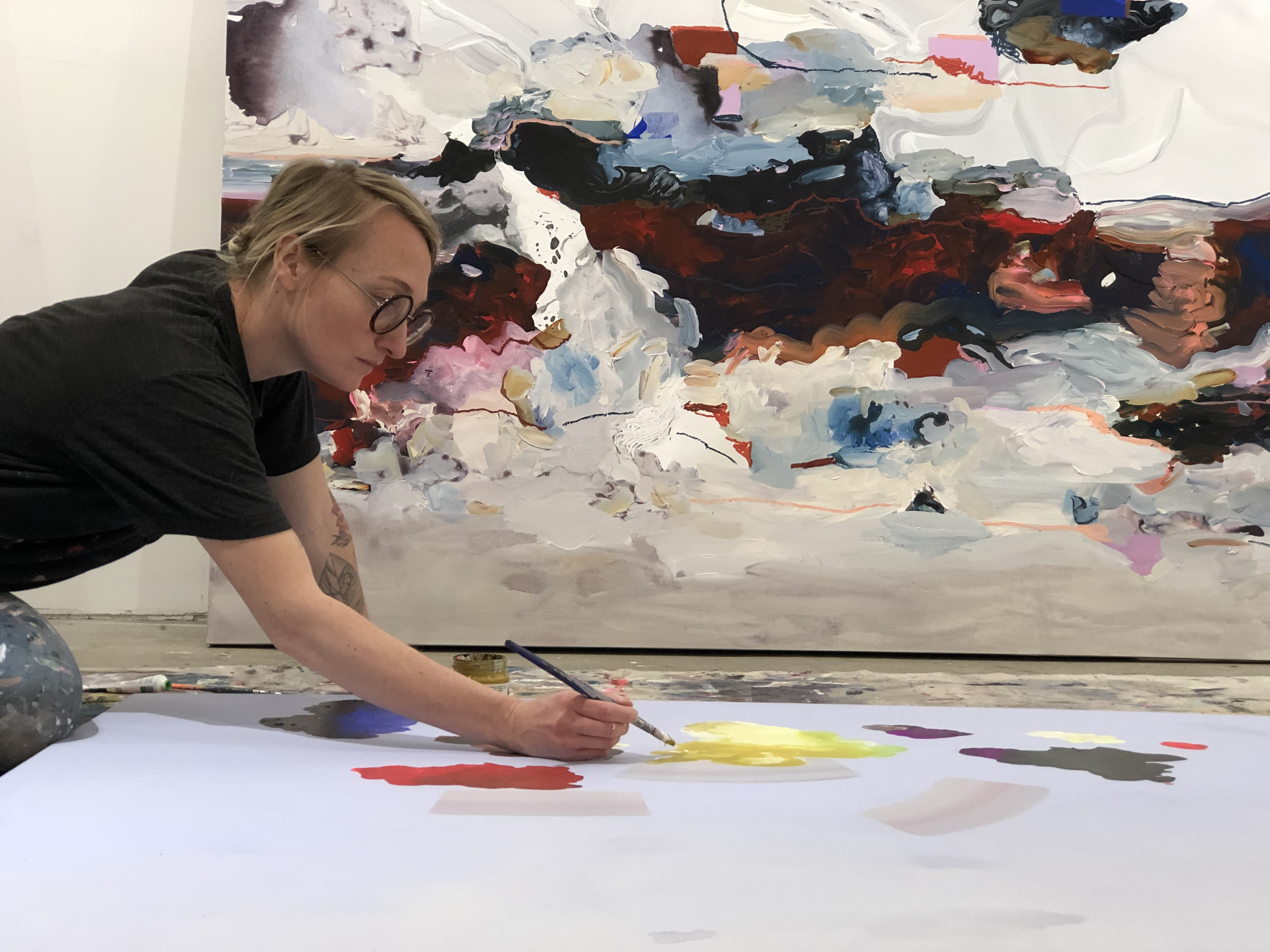
- Education: Ontario College of Art & Design University
- Known for: Painter, textile artist
- Website: www.jannawatson.com

Janna Watson is a Canadian artist, painter and designer known for abstract painting and textile arts.

== Early life and education ==
Watson's grandfather Arthur Bonnett was an abstract artist and landscape painter. Watson has credited him as an early mentor and a major influence on her art.

Watson graduated from the Ontario College of Art & Design University in 2008. In an interview with NOW, Watson commented that "I mostly work in acrylic because I am too impatient for oil paint to dry. My process is very intuitive so I never pre-plan what is going to happen."

== Career ==
In 2012, she collaborated on a multi-media exhibition with Katrina Tompkins at the Toronto Design Offsite Festival in 2012.

Watson began producing two-fold reversible rugs in 2014, which The Globe and Mail described as "modern fusion of functional art and high-end craft". In 2014, Watson was featured on House and Home.

In 2016, Watson's "Big Swoop" exhibition was shown at DesignTO. That year, she was included in Azure's list of "5 Emerging Designers That Rocked Toronto Design Week".

Watson's art has been exhibited at galleries such as the Foster/White Gallery in Seattle, the Bau Xi Gallery in Toronto and Galleri Couture in Stockholm. In February 2016, Watson's "There Is No Dimmer" series of paintings were debuted at the Bau Xi Gallery in Vancouver. exhibitions in Canada and the United States.

On September 4, 2018 Namesake unveiled a line of leather jackets at Fashion Revolution which featured designs by Watson among several other artists. That same year, her "Moody as Light" series was exhibited at Foster/White. Watson was also featured in Danielle Krysa's "Big Picture, Baby" exhibition at the Skye Gallery, along with artists Ashley Longshore, Daisy Patton, and Meghan Hildebrand.

Watson's paintings were featured in "The Real Eve", the third episode of season one of Law & Order Toronto: Criminal Intent. In the episode, Watson's art is displayed as the work of fictional art professor Eve Kinwood, whose murder is the central mystery.
