= Der Rufer =

Sculpture series by Gerhard Marcks

- The Caller; The Cryer; (English)
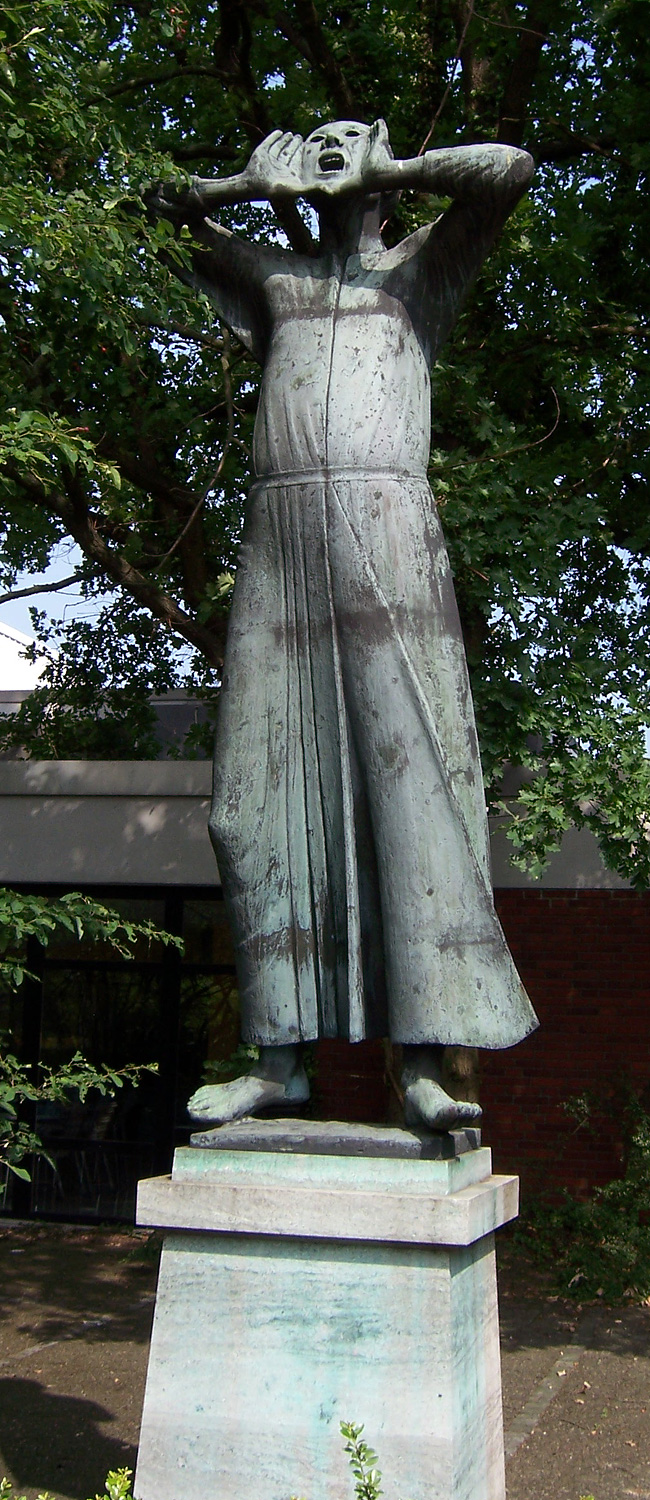
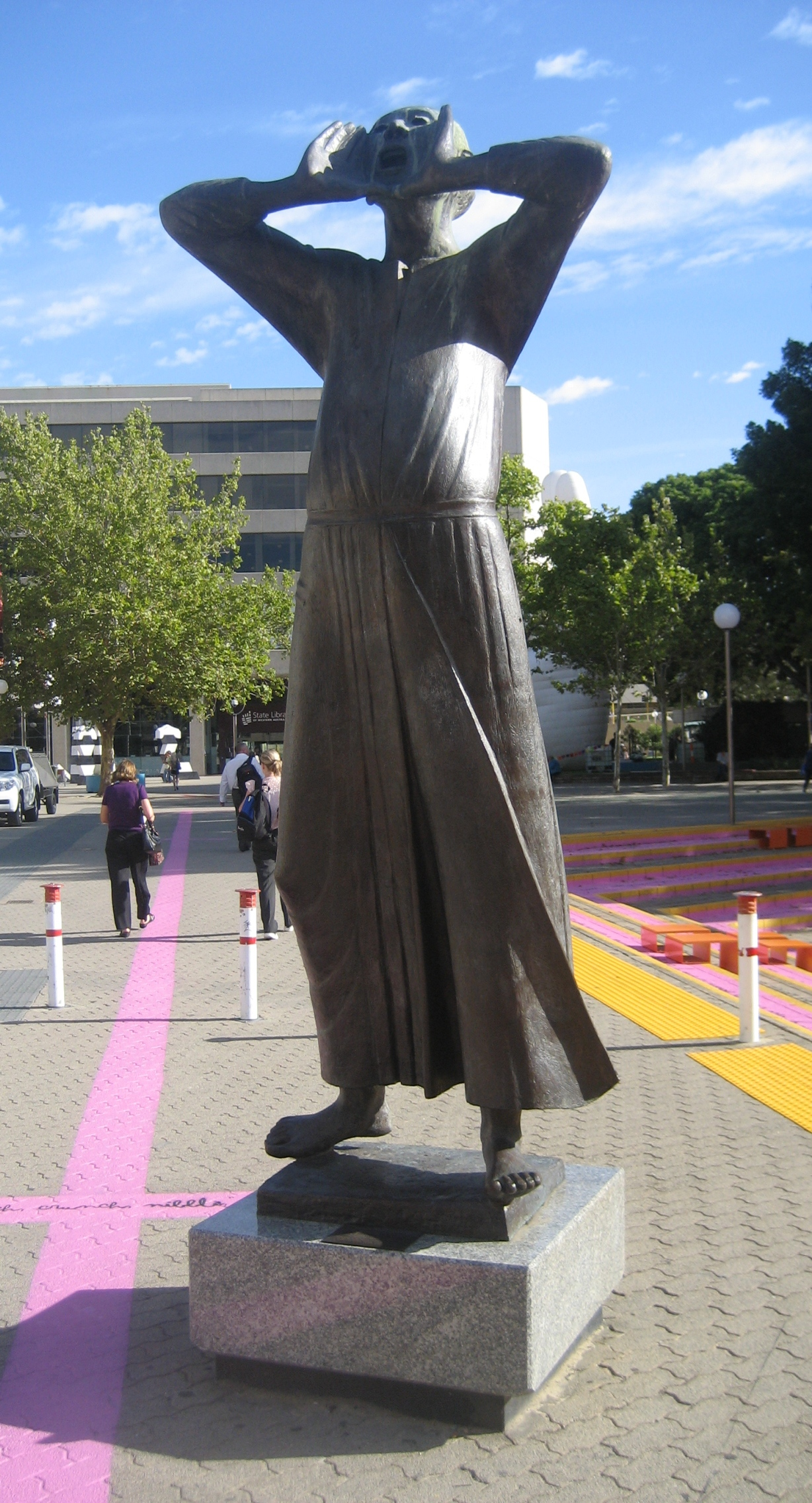
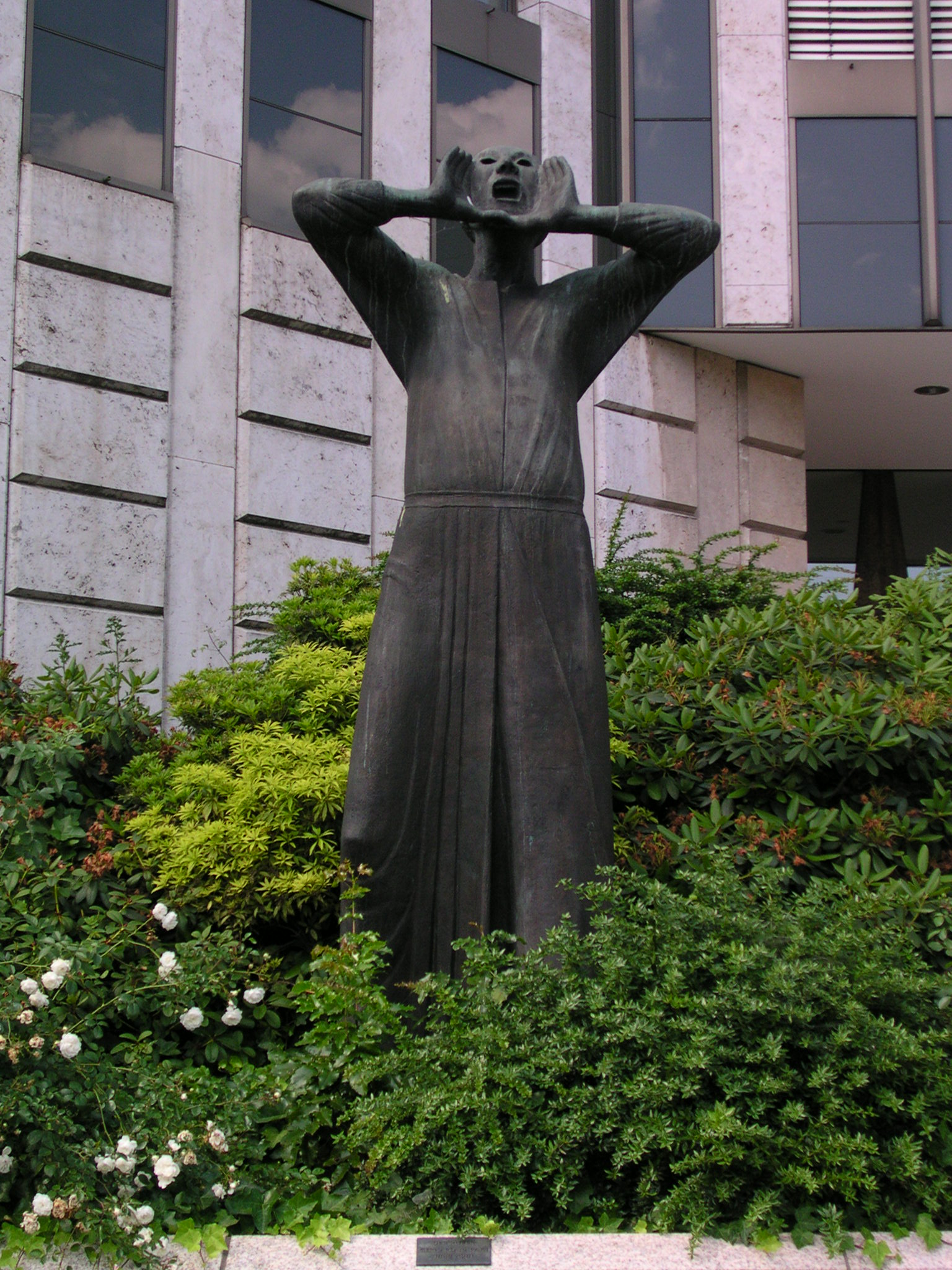
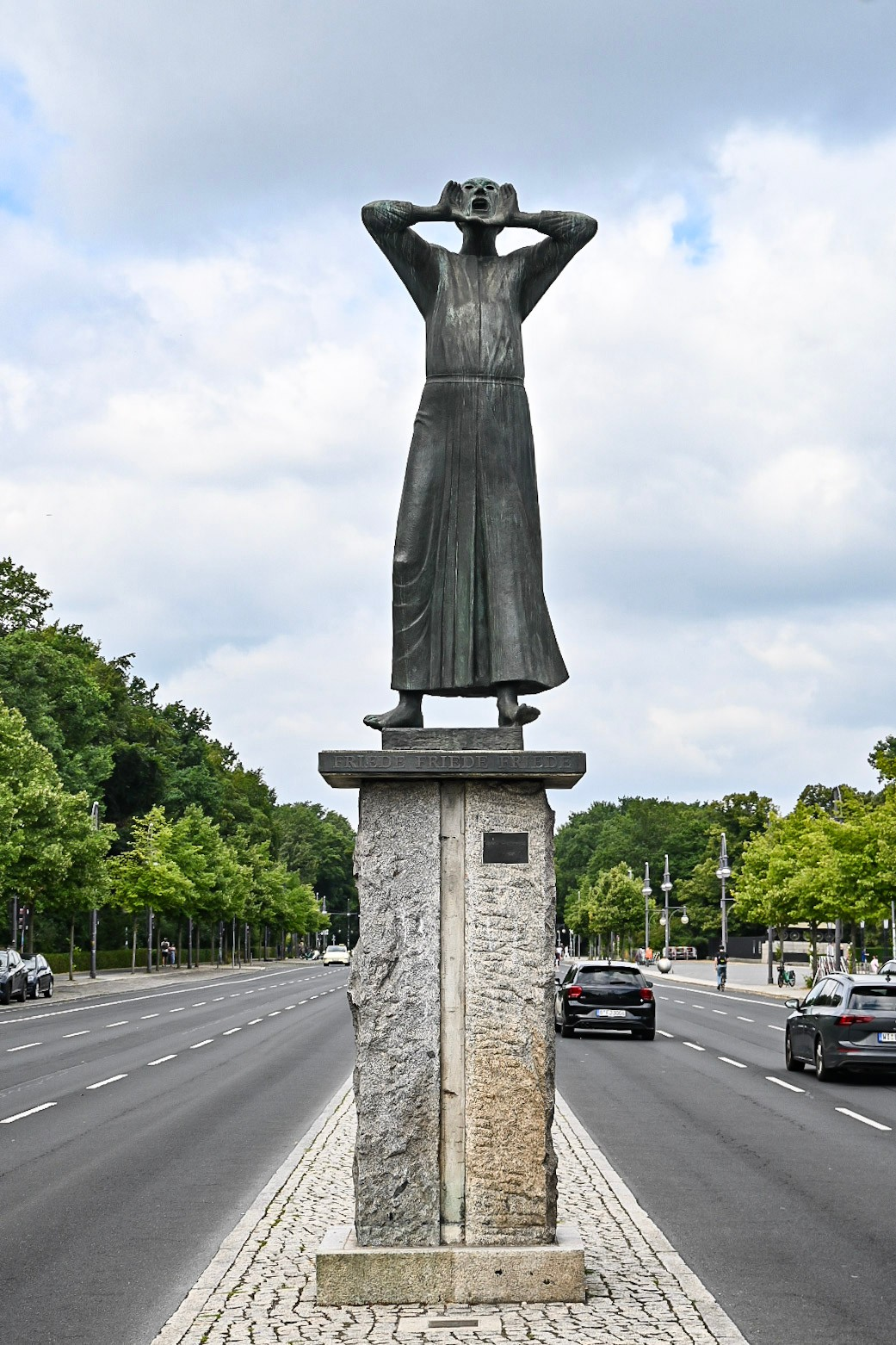
- Bremen, before moving to new headquarters Perth, before moving to rooftop Sculpture Walk of art gallery Aachen Berlin The original and casts, shown in order of erection
- Artist: Gerhard Marcks
- Year: 1966
- Location: Bremen (original); 53.079642°N 8.795596°E

Der Rufer ('the caller', 'the cryer') is a bronze sculpture created by Gerhard Marcks for Radio Bremen in 1966. The sculpture is of a barefooted man in a robe, cupping his hands to his mouth as if shouting. Casts of the original sculpture were erected in Perth in 1982, Aachen in 1986, and Berlin in 1989.

== History ==
The original commission was for a statue outside a telecommunications building in Bremen.

In 1982, a version of the statue was presented to the Art Gallery of Western Australia in Perth by CSR Limited. The Perth cast was dedicated to victims and survivors of torture in 1998. This cast was moved from the art gallery forecourt onto the roof as a feature in the Sculpture Walk that opened there in 2021.

Shortly before the fall of the Berlin Wall, a cast of the statue was installed near the Brandenburg Gate in Tiergarten in Berlin. The inscription contains a message of peace.
