= Kanazawa College of Art =

Higher education institution in Kanazawa, Japan

- 金沢美術工芸大学
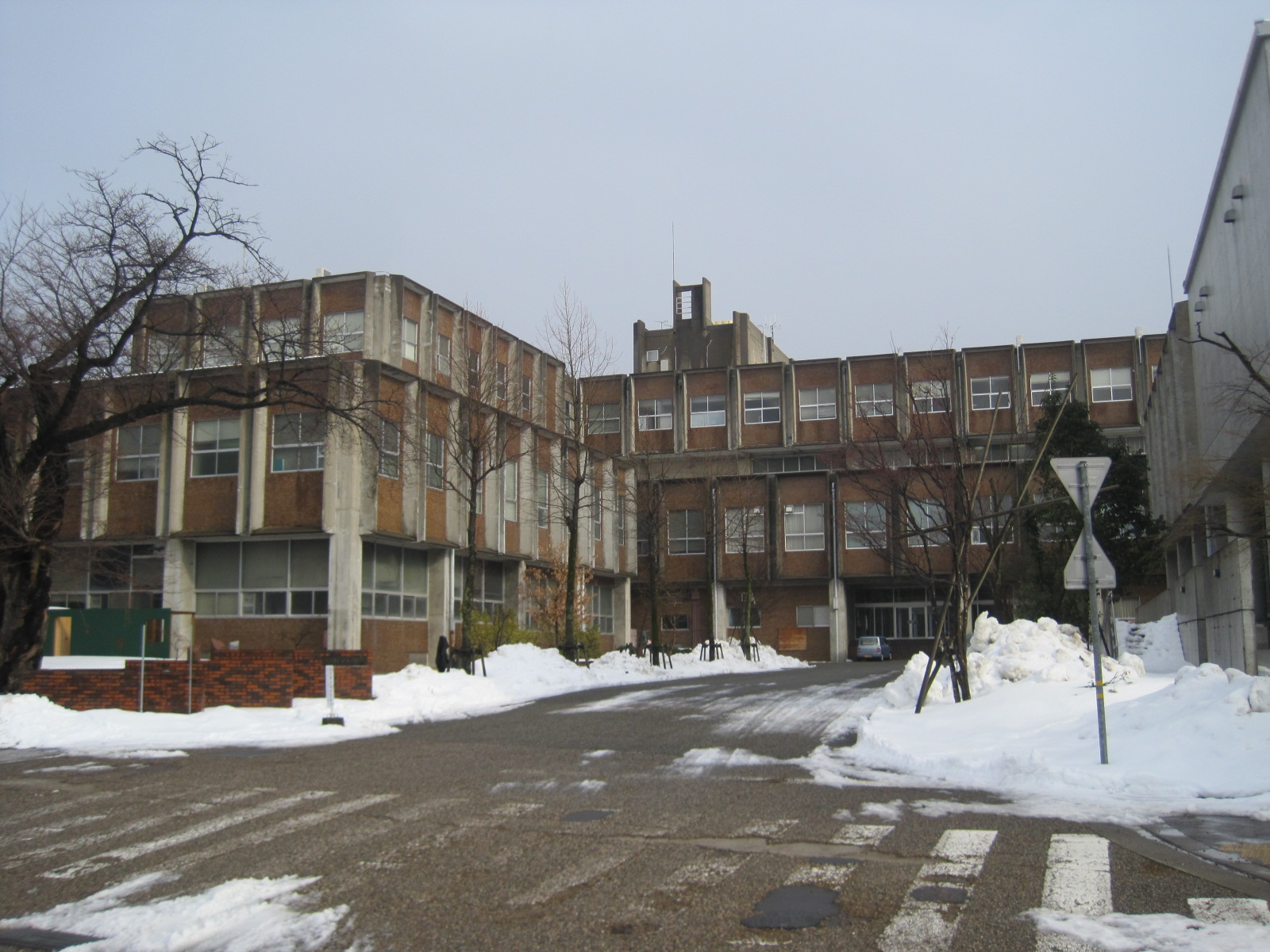
- Kanazawa College of Art
- Type: Public
- Undergraduates: 145
- Postgraduates: 32
- Doctoral students: 7
- Location: Kanazawa, Ishikawa, Japan; 36°33′23″N 136°40′38″E
- Language: Japanese
- Location within Japan

The Kanazawa College of Art (Japanese: 金沢美術工芸大学, Hepburn: Kanazawa Bijutsu Kōgei Daigaku; lit. 'Kanazawa Art and Industrial Design University'), colloquially known as Bidai or Kanabi, is a public university in Kanazawa, Ishikawa, Japan.

== About ==
Kanazawa College of Art was founded in 1946 by the Kanazawa municipal government following World War II, and became a full-fledged university in 1955. The graduate program was established in 1979.

Currently, on an annual basis the school enrolls 145 undergraduates, 32 for the master's program, and seven in the doctoral program. It is the smallest art university in Japan with regards to the number of students, only having about 600-700 students at any given time. The university is known for a peculiar tradition in which some students wear costumes to the graduation ceremony.

The university was originally located in the Dewa district of Kanazawa, and moved to its current location in 1972. In 2016 the university announced plans to relocate to a new campus in the near future, citing a lack of space, outdated and inadequate facilities, and no universally-accessible installations (such as slopes and wheelchair-friendly restrooms) in the nearly-50-year-old buildings among their concerns. The plans were formally approved in 2018; the new campus is scheduled to be completed in 2022 and to open in 2023.

== Notable alumni ==
- Norio Azuma - serigraph artist
- Kazuyoshi Hayagawa - television commercial director
- Akiko Higashimura - manga author
- Mamoru Hosoda - animation director
- Hitomi Hosono - ceramicist
- Naohisa Inoue - painter
- Shinya Kumazaki - video game director for HAL Laboratories
- Shigeru Miyamoto - video game producer for Nintendo
- Hiromasa Yonebayashi - animation director for Studio Ghibli
- Kinuko Y. Craft (Kinuko Yamabe) - painter and illustrator
