= Hiroshi Suzuki (silversmith) =

Japanese-born silversmith (born 1961)

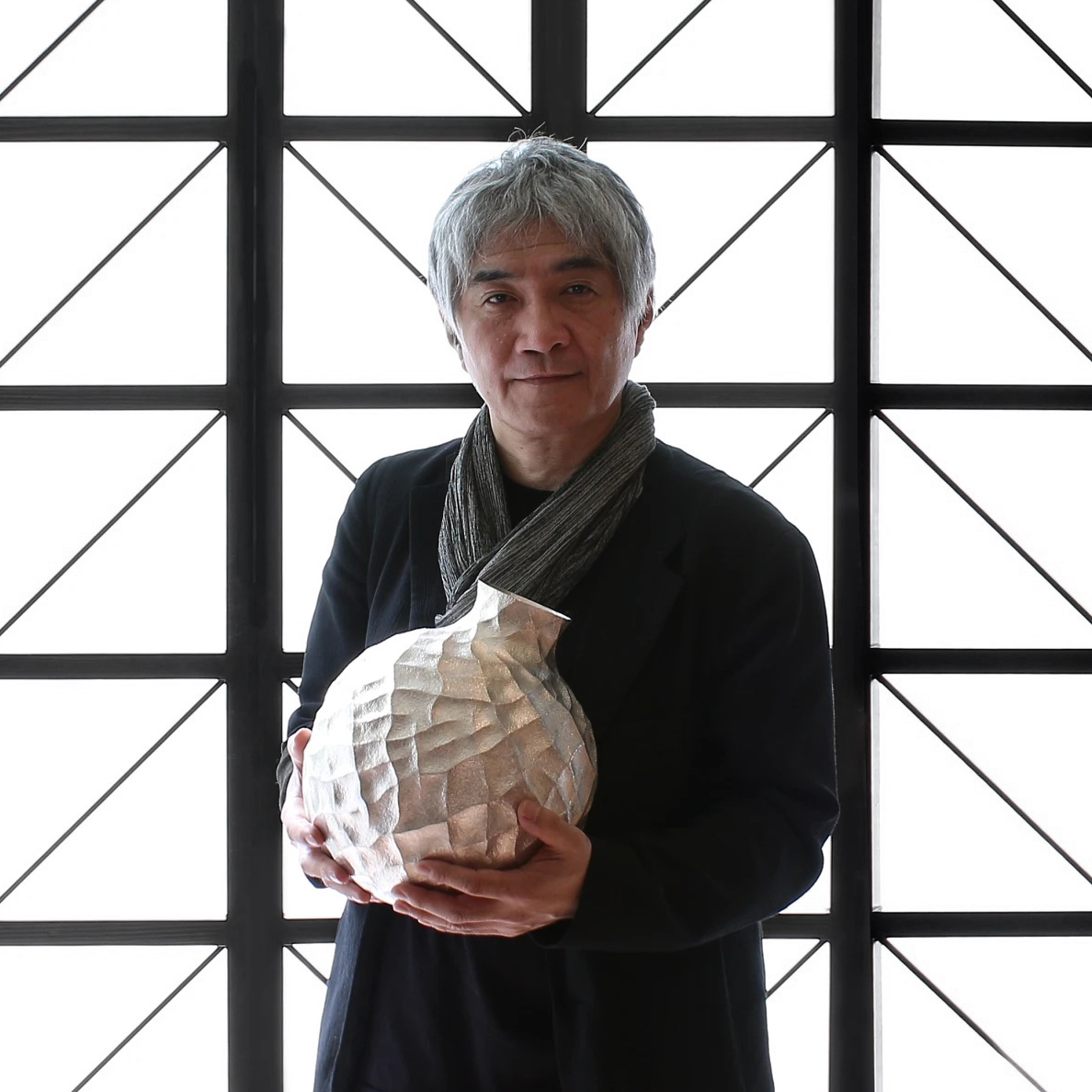
Suzuki in 2017

Hiroshi Suzuki (born 1961) is a Japanese-born silversmith. His work is represented in public collections including the Victoria and Albert Museum in London. Suzuki's practice has been described as combining elements of Eastern aesthetics with Western silversmithing traditions.

== Biography ==
Suzuki's father was a goldsmith, and his grandfather was a potter and a calligrapher. Born in 1961, in Sendai, he completed an MA at Musashino Art University in Tokyo, moved to London in 1993 and studied at Camberwell College of Art in 1994 and later the Royal College of Art. He is represented by London based art dealer Adrian Sassoon and has show his work at art fairs around the world including the Pavilion of Art and Design, London and Design Miami.

== Bibliography ==
- Hill, B., Putland, A. (2014). Silversmithing: A Contemporary Guide to Making. United Kingdom: Crowood Press. ISBN 9781847976161
