= Felicity Aylieff =

British ceramicist, professor and fellow at RCA London

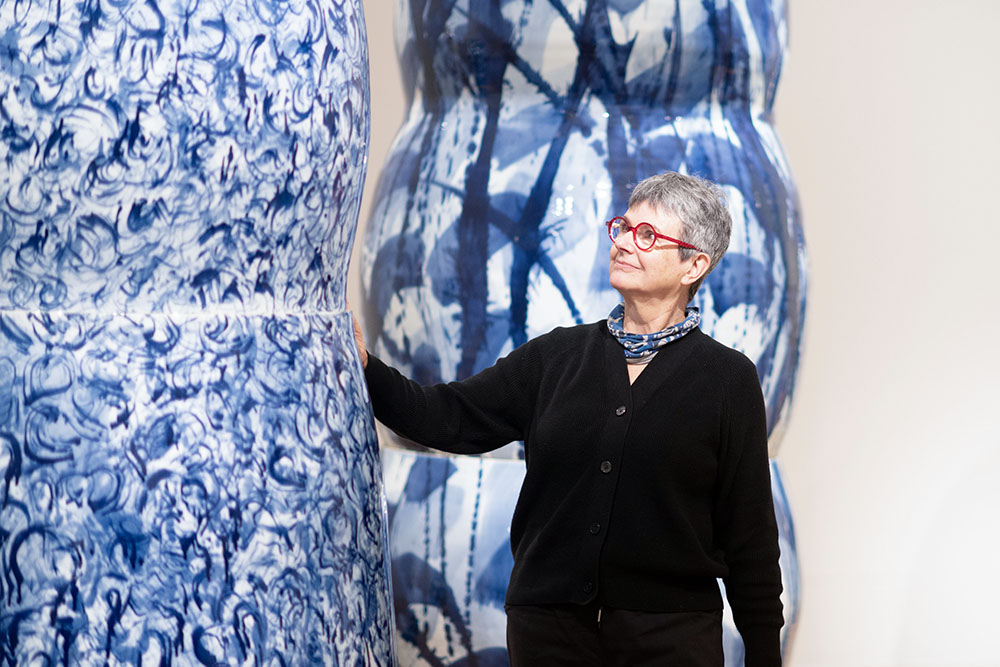
Felicity Aylieff at Shirley Sherwood Gallery, Royal Botanic Gardens, Kew in 2024

Felicity Aylieff (born 1954, Edlesborough, Bedfordshire, England) is a British ceramic artist, potter and educator, renowned for her large-scale porcelain works and her long-standing collaboration with porcelain workshops in Jingdezhen, China. She is Professor of Ceramics & Glass at the Royal College of Art, London. Her work is held in numerous international private and public collections including the Victoria and Albert Museum, London and the Museum of Fine Arts, Boston, USA.

== Early life and education ==
She studied at Bath Academy of Art 1972-8 (three-dimensional design, ceramics) where she earned a First Class Honours degree. She completed a postgraduate teaching year at Goldsmiths College in 1978–79. From 1993 to 1996, she undertook MPhil research at the Royal College of Art, focusing on the integration of glass and porcelain inclusions in clay bodies, under a project titled The Elusive Body.

== Career ==
After her postgraduate studies, Aylieff held various teaching positions: at Bedales School (1979–82), as a visiting lecturer at institutions such as Loughborough University, Glasgow University, Goldsmiths College and Cardiff University; associate lecturer at Bath College of Higher Education; then from 1989 to 2001 as full-time faculty at Bath Spa University. In 2001 she joined the Royal College of Art, becoming Senior Tutor in the Ceramics & Glass programme. She was made a Fellow of the Royal College of Art in 2008. In 2019, she stepped aside from day-to-day leadership to focus on her research and practice; she holds the title of Professor, Ceramics & Glass and Research. Her work has been widely exhibited in the UK and internationally in both solo and group exhibitions. Notable exhibitions include Sense and Perception (2002, Manchester City Art Gallery), Out of China (One Canada Square, Canary Wharf, London), Working to Scale, New Work: An Evolution, and Expressions in Blue: Monumental Porcelain at the Shirley Sherwood Gallery of Botanical Art, Kew Gardens (2024-2025). Felicity Aylieff is represented by Adrian Sassoon, London.

== Exhibitions ==
- Expressions in Blue: Monumental Porcelain at Petworth House and Park (2026)
- Expressions in Blue: Monumental Porcelain at The Weston Gallery & outdoors, Yorkshire Sculpture Park (2025)
- Expressions in Blue: Monumental Porcelain at the Shirley Sherwood Gallery of Botanical Art, Kew Gardens (2024–2025)
- Adrian Sassoon at Parham House at Parham house (2021)
- Treasures from Chatsworth at Sotheby's London and New York (2019)
- The Perfect Place to Grow at The Royal College of Art, London (2012)
- Porcelain City Jingdezhen at T.T.Tsui Gallery of Chinese Art, Victoria and Albert Museum (2011)
- Working at Scale at Contemporary Applied Arts, London (2009)
- Out of China: Monumental Porcelain at One Canada Square, London (2007)
- Sense and Perception at the Manchester Art Gallery (2002)
- The Elusive Body at the Victoria Art Gallery, Bath (1996)

== Collections ==
Her work is held in numerous public and private collections around the world, including:

- Victoria and Albert Museum, London
- Museum of Fine Arts, Boston, USA
- Chatsworth House, Derbyshire
- National Museum Cardiff, Wales
- Aberystwyth Arts Centre, Aberystwyth, Wales
- Crafts Coucil, England
- Devonshire Collections, Chatsworth House, Derbyshire
- Manchester Metropolitan University, Manchester
- National Museum of Scotland, Edinburgh
- Philadelphia Museum of Art, Pennsylvania, USA
