= Clare Belfrage =

Australian glass artist (born 1966)

Clare Belfrage (born 1966) is an Australian glass artist based in Adelaide, South Australia. Working at both JamFactory and her own home studio along with fellow glass artist and life partner Tim Edwards, she has exhibited her work around the world. She has also given workshops and instruction at numerous events and institutions, and as of May 2025 is an adjunct professor at the University of South Australia. She has won the prestigious Tom Malone Prize at the Art Gallery of Western Australia twice.

== Early life and education ==
Clare Belfrage was born in Melbourne in 1966.

She earned a Bachelor of Arts in Ceramic Design at Monash University, graduating in 1988.

== Career ==
Belfrage started exhibiting her work in 1987. She joined JamFactory in Adelaide as a Glass Studio associate in 1991, and in 1996 spent a year as the Glass Studio's production manager, when Nick Mount headed the studios. In 1996 she was appointed as lecturer in Glass Studies at the University of South Australia (UniSA) School of Art.

She has also worked in Canberra, where she was creative director of Canberra Glassworks from 2009 to 2013.

In 1997 Belfrage was a founding member of the Blue Pony (styled blue pony) studio in Adelaide, along with Gabriella Bisetto, Deb Jones, Matt Larwood, and Barbara Jane Cowie. Over its 14 years from 1997 until its closure in 2011, the studio was used by many independent as well as collaborative glassmakers, including Tim Edwards, Tom Moore, Christine Cholewa, Karen Cunningham, and Mandi King. Belfrage practised at the studio until 2008.

Belfrage continues to work extensively in JamFactory. Her work has often been exhibited in North America, Europe, Hong Kong, and New Zealand.

== Style and practice ==
Belfrage is known for her "detailed and complex glass drawing on blown glass forms". Her work has been described as "highly distinctive for its sophisticated surface patterns and its delicate hand-polished satin finish". She uses a very slow process, sometimes "drawing directly onto blown glass forms with spaghetti-thin canes of glass called 'stringers' or sometimes integrating painstakingly prefabricated patterned glass patches into the surface of the form".

She is inspired by natural forms, and has said:

As an artist, my point of view is often looking from close up. The big feeling that small gives me is intimate and powerful. The industry in nature, its rhythm and energy, dramatic and delicate still holds my fascination as does the language and processes of glass.

== Teaching ==
Belfrage has lectured in the glass programs at the University of South Australia (UniSA), Curtin University in Western Australia. She has also taught in many workshops around Australia, New Zealand, Japan, and the United States.

In the United States, she has taught at the Pilchuck Glass School in Washington, several times since 1995, when she served as a teaching assistant for Richard Marquis and Nick Mount. Pilchuck, situated around 80 km (50 mi) north of Seattle, was founded by Dale Chihuly in 1971, and is the most significant school for glass artists in the world, offering residential sessions over the spring and summer months. She has also taught at Ohio State University, and was an instructor at Corning Museum of Glass in New York City

From 2003 to 2008 Belfrage was adjunct researcher at the South Australian School of Art at UniSA.

As of 2025 she is an adjunct professor at UniSA.

== Other activities ==
From 1993 to 1995 Belfrage was vice president of Ausglass, the Australian Association of Glass Artists. She served as a peer assessor on Arts South Australia's Established and International peer assessment panel from 2004 to 2006, and from 2015 to 2016 on its Visual Arts, Craft and Design panel.

She has given demonstrations and guest lectures at a number of international institutions, and was a judge for the FUSE Glass Prize at JamFactory in 2018.

In 2017 she was appointed a member of the board of the not-for-profit Guildhouse, where she remained deputy chair until 2025.

== Recognition and awards ==
Belfrage has an international reputation as a leader in her field.

Her work has been recognised in a number of ways over the years, including:

- 2005: Winner, Tom Malone Prize, Art Gallery of Western Australia
- 2007 & 2009: Visiting artist, Tacoma Museum of Glass, in Tacoma, Washington, US
- 2011: Winner, Tom Malone Prize, Art Gallery of Western Australia
- 2016: Inaugural FUSE Glass Prize
- 2018: South Australian Living Artist (SALA) feature artist, subject of the festival's annual monograph Rhythms of Necessity (by Kay Lawrence and Sera Waters)
- 2023: Artist in Residence at the Nancy Fairfax Studio

== Personal life ==
Belfrage is married to Tim Edwards, who is also an internationally acclaimed glass artist. They have two sons. They share a home studio in the Adelaide suburb of Kensington.

== Exhibitions ==
=== Solo exhibitions ===
Significant solo exhibitions include:

- 1993: First solo exhibition, Gallery2, JamFactory, Adelaide
- 1997: Aroma, Beaver Galleries, Canberra
- 1998: Line Drawings, Purple Space, JamFactory
- 2002: Aura, Quadrivium (a gallery in the Queen Victoria Building, Sydney, dedicated to exhibiting emerging Australian artists' work, open 1996–2004)
- 2003: Clare Belfrage, Recent Works in Glass, Brisbane City Gallery, Brisbane
- 2004: Shifting Lines, Masterworks Gallery, Auckland, New Zealand
- 2009: Clare Belfrage, New Works, Foster/White Gallery, Seattle, US
- 2009: The Depth of Surface, Canberra Glassworks, Canberra
- 2011: Swatch, Sabbia Gallery, Sydney
- 2013: Threads, Foster/White Gallery, Seattle
- 2017: Drawing Out Time, Sabbia Gallery, Sydney
- 2017: Falling Into, Tansey Contemporary, Denver, US
- August – September 2017: Clare Belfrage: A Natural Way, an exhibition as part of SALA, at Fermoy House, Adelaide
- 2018: JamFactory ICON exhibition, Clare Belfrage: A Measure of Time, which toured nationally to 10 venues throughout Australia until 2021
- 2018: A Breathing Landscape, Tansey Contemporary, Santa Fe, New Mexico, US
- 2020: Deep Skin, Sabbia Gallery, Sydney
- 2023: In the Glow of Green, Tweed Regional Gallery & Margaret Olley Art Centre, New South Wales

=== Group exhibitions ===
Belfrage's work has been exhibited in numerous exhibitions across Australia and internationally. Just a few are listed below.

- 1987–88: Several exhibitions in Melbourne
- 1989: ANZ Glass Prize, Glass Artists Gallery, Sydney
- 1993: Multiple group exhibitions around Australia
- 2004: Clare Belfrage and Tim Edwards, Recent Works in Glass, Foster/White Gallery, Seattle, US
- December 2024 to March 2025: Gathering Light, a group exhibition at JamFactory, developed in association with the Chihuly in the Botanic Garden exhibition, highlighting links between Adelaide and the Pilchuck Glass School

== Collections ==
Belfrage's work is held in collections around Australia and internationally, including in:

=== Australia ===
- Art Gallery of South Australia
- Art Gallery of Western Australia
- Artbank, NSW
- Museum and Art Gallery of the Northern Territory
- Museum of Applied Arts and Sciences (Powerhouse Museum), Sydney
- National Art Glass Collection, Wagga Wagga
- National Gallery of Australia, Canberra
- Tasmanian Museum and Art Gallery

=== Elsewhere ===
- Castello Sforzesco Museum, Italy
- Corning Museum of Glass, New York City, US
- Ebeltoft Glass Museum, Ebeltoft, Denmark
- Museo do Vidro, Marinha Grande, Portugal
- Niijima Glass Museum, Niijima, Japan
- Tacoma Museum of Glass, US
