= Art Gallery of Western Australia =

Public art gallery in Perth, Western Australia

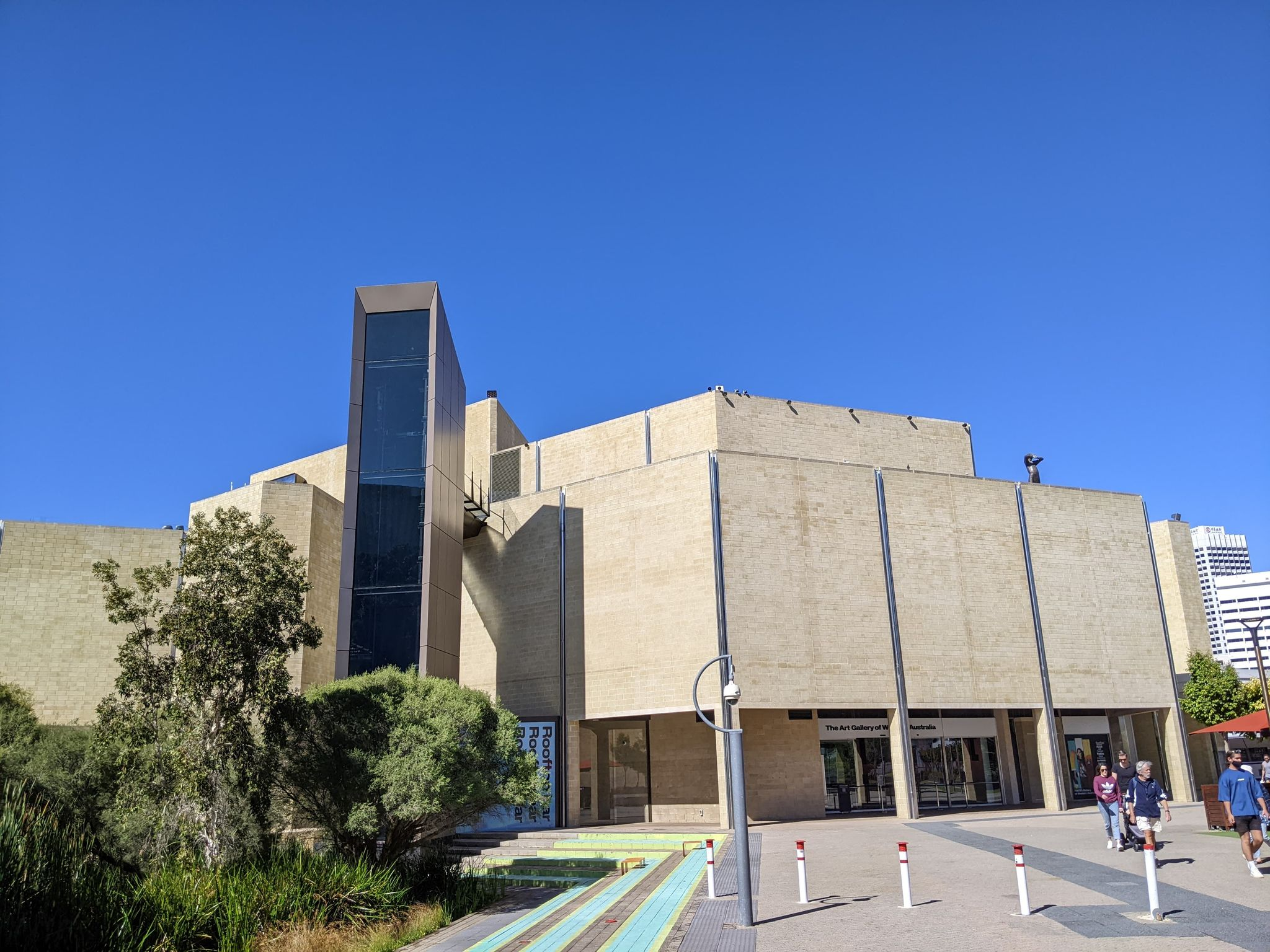
- Main entrance below Sculpture Walk, Der Rufer just visible at top right
- Established: 1895; 131 years ago
- Location: Perth Cultural Centre, Perth, Western Australia
- Coordinates: 31°57′02″S 115°51′39″E
- Type: Art gallery
- Collection size: 18,800
- Visitors: 448,247 (2025)
- Director: Colin Walker
- Owner: Government of Western Australia
- Public transit access: Perth railway station, Transperth
- Website: artgallery.wa.gov.au

Western Australia Heritage Register
- Official name: Art Gallery & Museum Buildings
- Type: State Registered
- Designated: 28 August 2001
- Part of: Perth Cultural Centre
- Reference no.: 1962

The Art Gallery of Western Australia (AGWA) is a public art gallery that is part of the Perth Cultural Centre, in Perth. It is located near the Western Australian Museum and State Library of Western Australia and is supported and managed by the Department of Local Government, Sport and Cultural Industries of the Government of Western Australia. The current gallery main building opened in 1979. It is linked to the old court house – The Centenary Galleries.

== History ==
The Art Gallery was originally housed in the Jubilee Building with the State Museum and Library. The Jubilee Building, which was intended to be a public library only, was to be opened in honour of Queen Victoria's Golden Jubilee in 1887, but instead, only the first stone for the foundation was laid. The foundation stone was laid for the Art Gallery in July 1901 by the Duke of Cornwall and York, shortly after the federation of Australia.

Several notable individuals were involved with the development of the Jubilee Building and Art Gallery, including John Winthrop Hackett, James Battye, Ludwig Glauert, George Pitt Morison and George Temple-Poole. James Dromgole Linton recommended purchases for the State Art Collection.

The Art Gallery Administration Building is housed in the former Police Quarters, designed by architect Hillson Beasley, who also designed Government House. It was built during the economic boom created by the 1890s Kalgoorlie gold rush. The Administration Building moved into the Police Quarters in the 1970s during the nickel mining boom.

The Main Gallery Building was built in 1977, and was also spurred by the mining boom. Western Australia was also placing more importance on cultural institutions, and the government was inspired by the upcoming 150th anniversary of federation in 1979. Construction of the Alexander Library began in the same period.

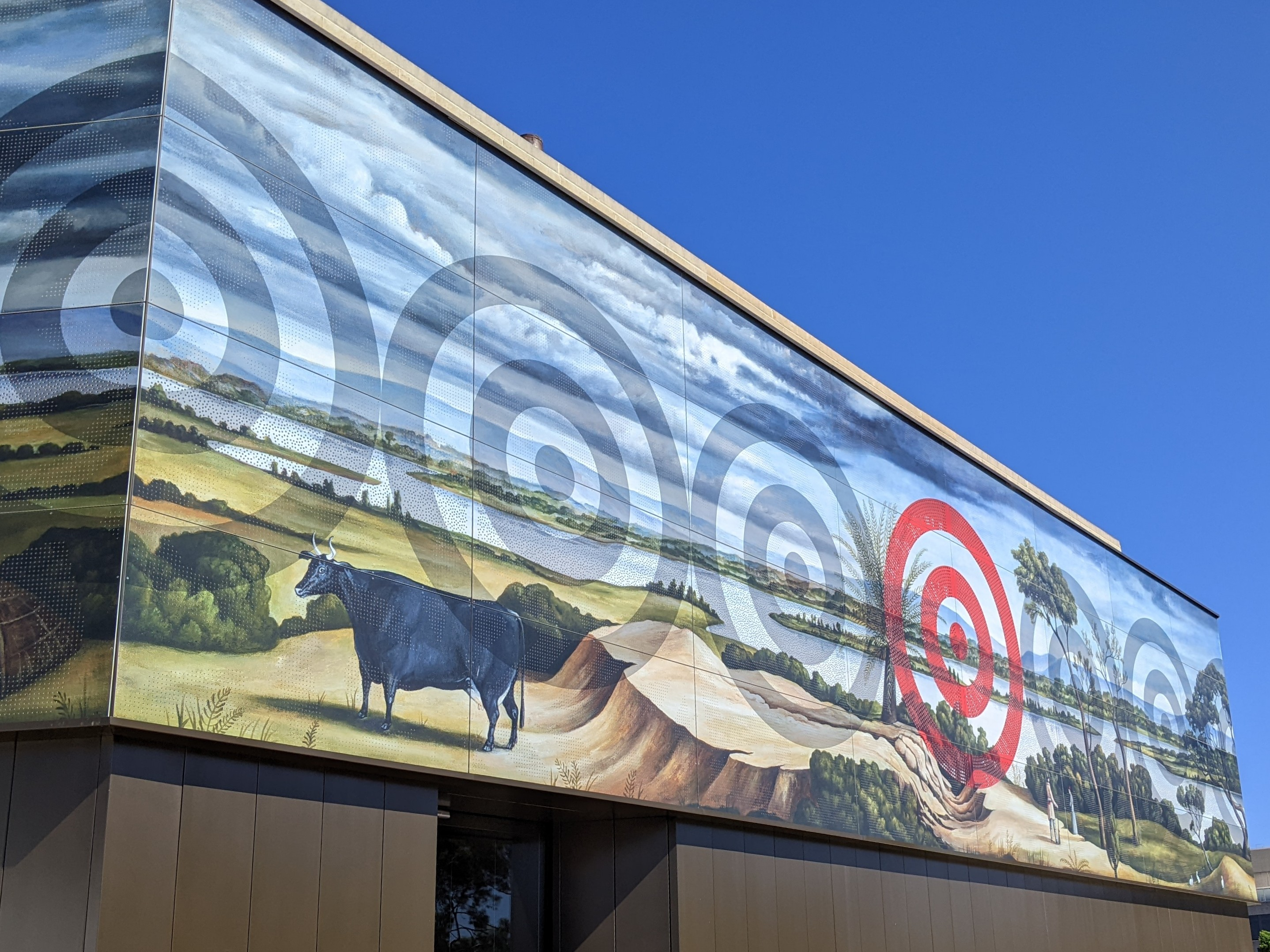
Targets by Christopher Pease, a 34-metre (112 ft) art work which wraps around the roof of the Art Gallery

The architect of the main gallery building was Charles Sierakowski from the Public Works Department, who worked with engineer Philip Nadebaum and architectural company, Summerhayes and Associates.It was designed in the Bauhaus method with a Brutalist exterior, which was popular in European design. The slab and shear head column system was an innovative architectural feature in Western Australia at the time.

In 2017 AGWA announced plans to redevelop its rooftop as focus for sculpture, events, restaurants and film, in a project called AGWA Elevate. This opened in November 2021. The state government pledged A$10 million towards this project. In the same year, "Six Seasons", a high-profile project to increase the focus on AGWA's Indigenous art, was initiated, with a new dedicated permanent Indigenous gallery inaugurated alongside "Plain Speak", a special exhibit for the Perth International Arts Festival.

== Collections and exhibitions ==
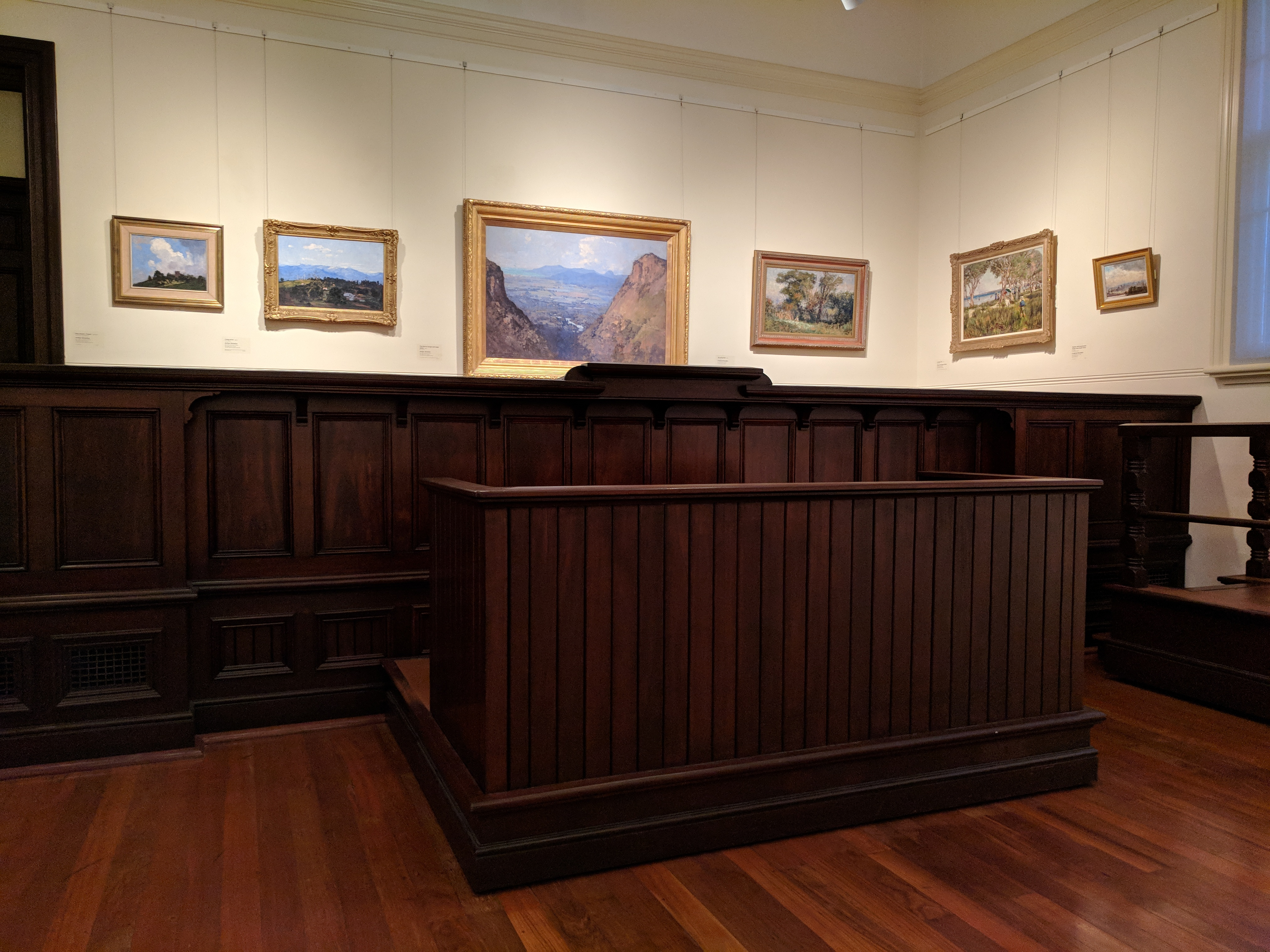
A room at the Art Gallery of Western Australia's Centenary Gallery building which was converted from a courtroom

The Aesthetic Movement inspired aspects of the Art Gallery's collection.

Ongoing exhibitions include Indigenous traditional and contemporary art from the Northern Territory and Western Australia, and Western Australian art from the 1820s to 1960s, alongside topical displays on key themes drawn from the collection.

Desert River Sea: Kimberley Art Then and Now is a major project begun around 2013, exploring Indigenous Australian art with funding support from Rio Tinto to the tune of A$1.8 million. In 2019, Desert River Sea: Portraits of the Kimberley was mounted, a culmination of a six-year project between AGWA and Aboriginal artists and six art centres of the Kimberley. There is a separate website dedicated to the project.

Each year since 1992, AGWA exhibits work by talented graduating high school artists in its Year 12 Perspectives exhibition. In 2018, there were 55 works exhibited.

=== Awards ===
==== The Lester Prize ====
The Lester Prize, formerly the Black Swan Prize for Portraiture, is one of Australia's richest portraiture prizes. Forty finalists are exhibited at AGWA during October and November each year.

In 2007 Tina Wilson founded the Black Swan Prize and ARTrinsic Inc to manage it. In 2014, included the Black Swan Prize for Heritage, for artworks depicting aspects of the heritage of Perth, and supported by the City of Perth. In 2016 the award moved to AGWA, at which time Wilson stepped down from her role as patron.

In April 2019, the prize was renamed the Lester Prize in recognition of the award's main patron, Richard (Dick) Lester. As of 2022, in addition to the main Richard Lester Prize for Portraiture (worth A$50,000), the awards include the Minderoo Foundation Spirit Prize; the Tony Fini Foundation Artist Prize; the Barton Family Foundation Installers' Prize; and the Ashurst Emerging Artist Prize, with a total prize pool of A$105,000. In 2022, 720 entries were submitted from across the country.

==== Tom Malone Glass Art Prize ====
The Tom Malone Glass Art Prize, formerly known as the Tom Malone Prize (TMP), was established in 2003 by then governor of the AGWA Foundation, Elizabeth Malone. From 2018 it was supported by benefactor Sheryl Grimwood. The prize is awarded for contemporary glass art.

The acquisitive prize was worth A$15,000 in 2022, when it celebrated its 20th year. The prize was increased to A$20,000 in 2023, when the shortlisted entries were presented in a new venue, at Linton and Kay Galleries in The Pickle District of West Perth. As of 2025, the prize is worth A$20,000

Winners include:

- 2005: Clare Belfrage
- 2011: Clare Belfrage
- 2019: Mark Eliott, Down at the water table
- 2020: Mel Douglas,Tonal Value, 2019
- 2022: Tim Edwards, Ellipse #8
- 2023: Liam Fleming, Transitory Form #8

== Gallery ==
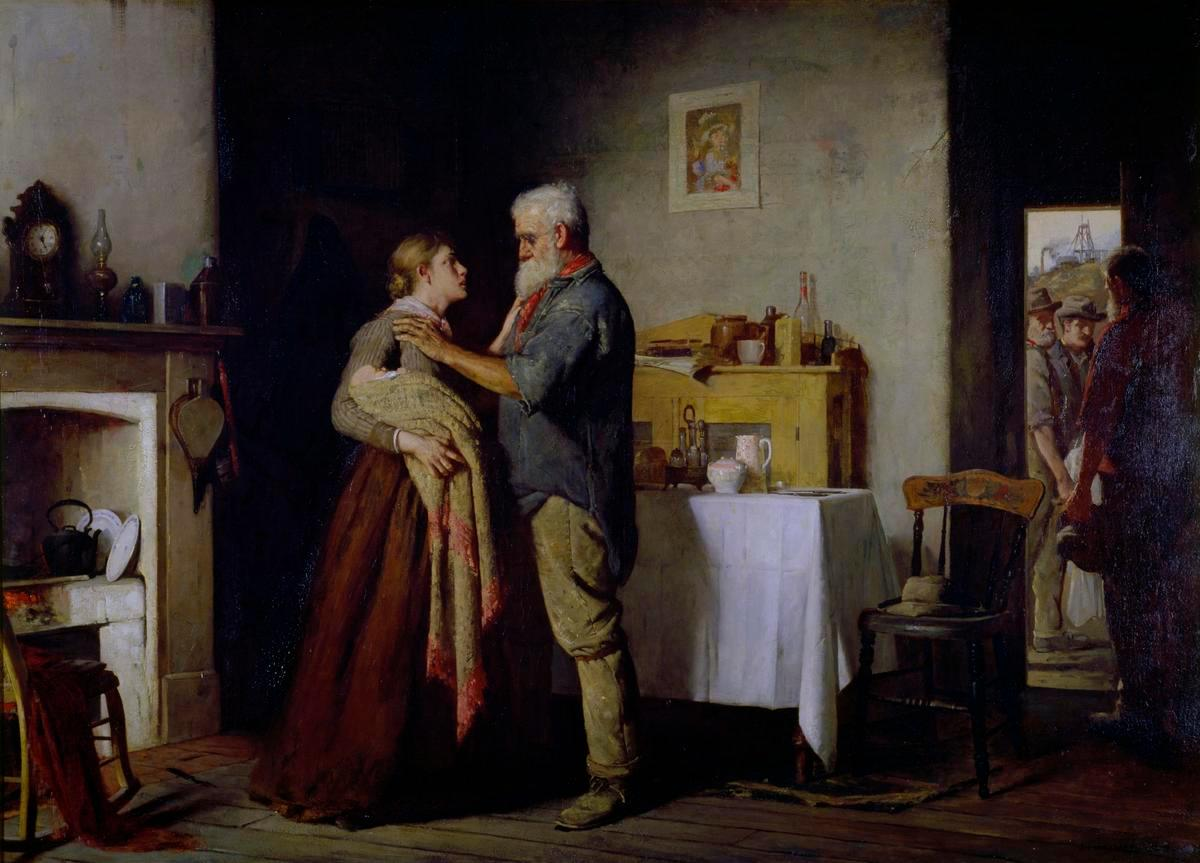
John Longstaff, Breaking the News, 1887

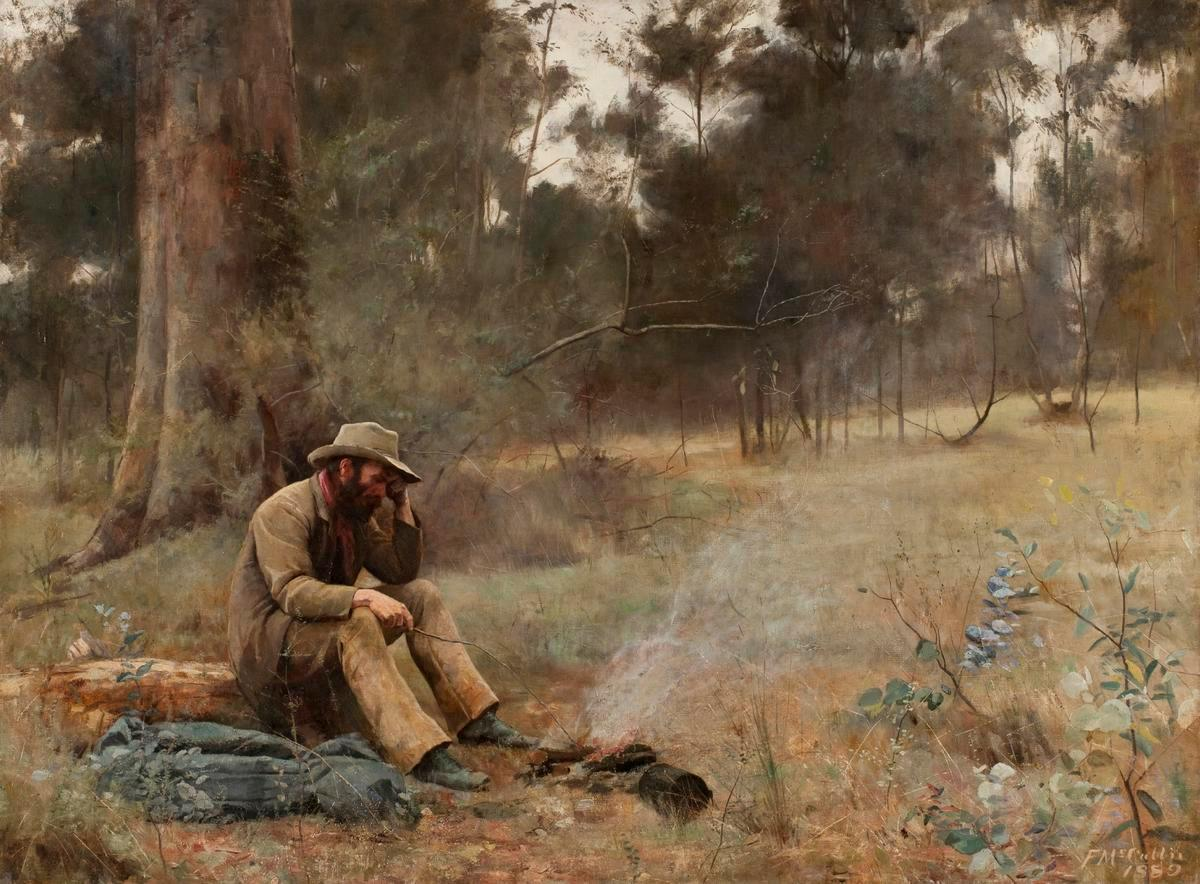
Frederick McCubbin, Down on His Luck, 1889

Hans Heysen, Droving into the Light, 1921

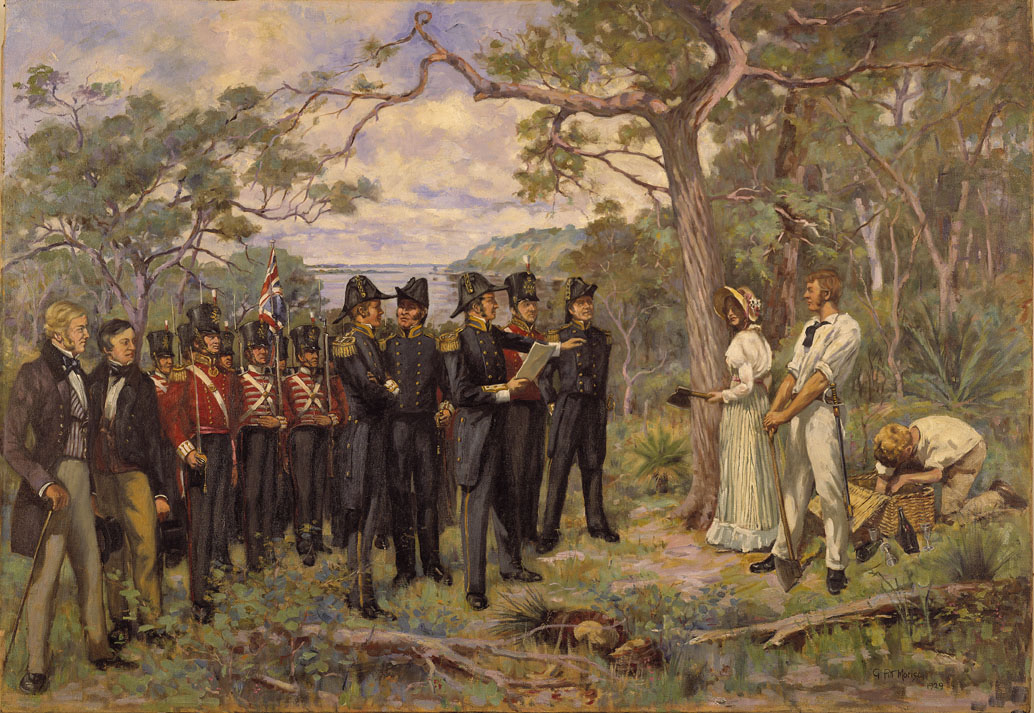
George Pitt Morison, The Foundation of Perth 1829, 1929

== See also ==
- National Gallery of Australia
- National Gallery of Victoria
- Queensland Art Gallery
- Art Gallery of South Australia
- Art Gallery of New South Wales
- Tasmanian Museum and Art Gallery
