= Wagga Wagga Art Gallery =

Coordinates: 35°6′34.21″S 147°22′19.89″E

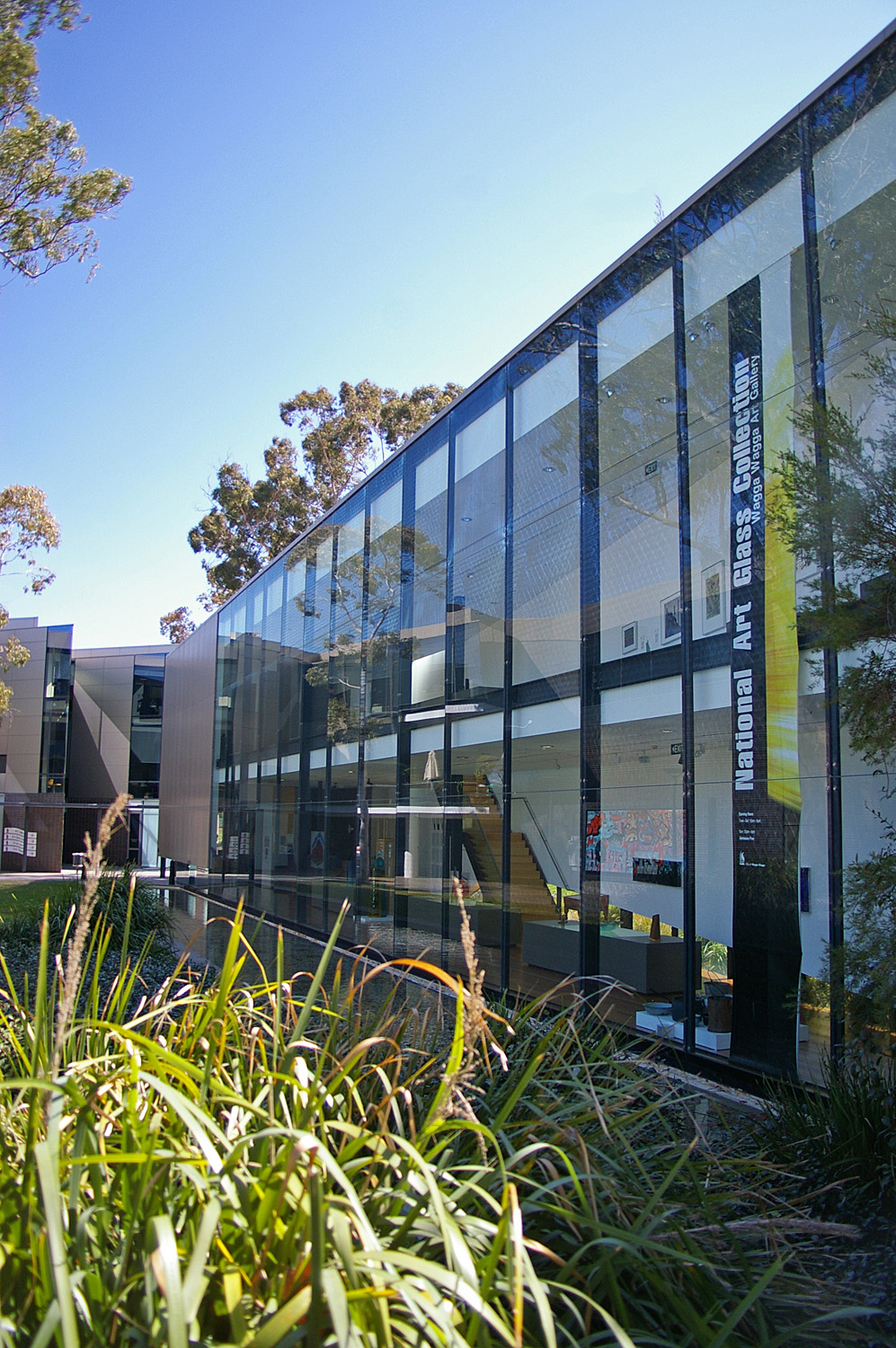
- National Art Glass Gallery viewed from Morrow Street
- Established: 1979
- Location: Wagga Wagga, New South Wales
- Type: Art gallery
- Website: wagga.nsw.gov.au/community/arts-and-culture/wagga-wagga-art-gallery

The Wagga Wagga Art Gallery is an art gallery in Wagga Wagga, New South Wales, Australia. It includes the National Art Glass Gallery, which houses the National Art Glass Collection, and also houses the Margaret Carnegie Print Collection, a general collection of art, as well as the art collection of the Wagga Wagga Art Society.

== History ==
The Australia Council for the Arts started supporting the establishment of regional galleries in the 1970s, with the aim of creating specialist collections in each to avoid competition and repetition. The focus in Wagga Wagga became studio glass. One of the earliest hot glass teaching studios in Australia was established at the Riverina College of Advanced Education (now part of Charles Sturt University) by John Elsegood in 1978. Judy Le Lievre was appointed as director of the gallery, then named Wagga Wagga City Gallery, in June 1979. She had an interest in glass art, and been involved with Riverina College. She developed an acquisition policy "to develop a nationally important collection of contemporary glass" at the gallery.

In 1992, the glass collection was formally named the National Art Glass Collection, in recognition of its national significance, holding the largest public collection of studio art glass in Australia. In 1999, Wagga Wagga Art Gallery was relocated to Wagga Wagga Civic Centre, designed by Melbourne architects Garner Davis.

== Description ==
Wagga Wagga Art Gallery is located at the Wagga Wagga Civic Centre, with a separate specially designed building to house the National Art Glass Collection, representing a shard of glass fracturing away from the main building. The National Art Glass Collection is a nationally and internationally significant collection of contemporary art glass. As of 2025 there are around 400 pieces in the collection. Acquisition of new works is mostly funded by Wagga Wagga City Council, along with various grants and private donations of money and artworks.

The gallery also houses the Margaret Carnegie Print Collection, which is a general collection of art, as well as the art collection of the Wagga Wagga Art Society.

== Exhibitions ==
Curated exhibitions of glass art are held throughout the year, featuring well-known Australian and international artists.

On 5 June 2009 Colour Country: Art from Roper River was launched at the art gallery as part of "Mawang (Altogether) - Celebrating Indigenous Culture", the council's winter festival of events. The exhibition catalogue was written by Cath Bowdler, with contributions by Judith Ryan and Nicolas Rothwell. The exhibition toured nationally until 2010, including to Flinders University Art Museum in Adelaide; the Drill Hall Gallery in Canberra; and the Museum and Art Gallery of the Northern Territory in Darwin.

From mid-February until July 2024, an exhibition funded by Create NSW, entitled Shattering the Glass Ceiling – Women Artists in the National Art Glass Collection, was mounted. The exhibition included the pieces from the National Art Glass Collection by more than 20 women artists, including Kate Baker, Clare Belfrage, Jessica Loughlin, Judi Elliott, Kathy Elliott, and Nancy Yu.
