= Foster/White Gallery =

American commercial art gallery

- Former name: Richard White Gallery
- Established: 1966; 60 years ago
- Location: Seattle, Washington, USA
- Coordinates: 47°36′01″N 122°19′48″W
- Type: Gallery
- Collections: Contemporary art
- Website: Official website

The Foster/White Gallery is an art gallery in Seattle, Washington, in the United States. It was started as the Richard White Gallery in 1966 in the Pioneer Square neighborhood.

== History ==
Richard White started the Richard White Gallery at 311½ Occidental Avenue South, in the Pioneer Square district of Seattle, in 1966. In 1973, he sold it to Donald Foster, who renamed it the Foster/White Gallery. Foster sold it in December 2002 to the Huang family, owners of the Bau-Xi Gallery in Vancouver, British Columbia. In April 2006 it moved to a renovated building at 220 3rd Avenue South, a few blocks from its original location. It earlier had other premises in Kirkland, Rainier Square, and Pioneer Square.

In the mid-1980s, Foster/White was one of five galleries which started the Pioneer Square Exhibition Magazine, a monthly magazine to publicize their shows. In 1990 the gallery was among the founding members of the Seattle Art Dealers Association, which in 2005 took over publication of the magazine, renaming it the SADA Exhibition Guide.

The gallery shows mostly contemporary art and work by artists of the Northwest School. Some work by Kenneth Callahan, Alden Mason, Mark Tobey and George Tsutakawa is permanently on show. The first Seattle showing of glass work by Dale Chihuly was at the gallery in 1977. Janna Watson showed work there in 2016.
