= Canberra Glassworks =

Australian gallery and glass art studio

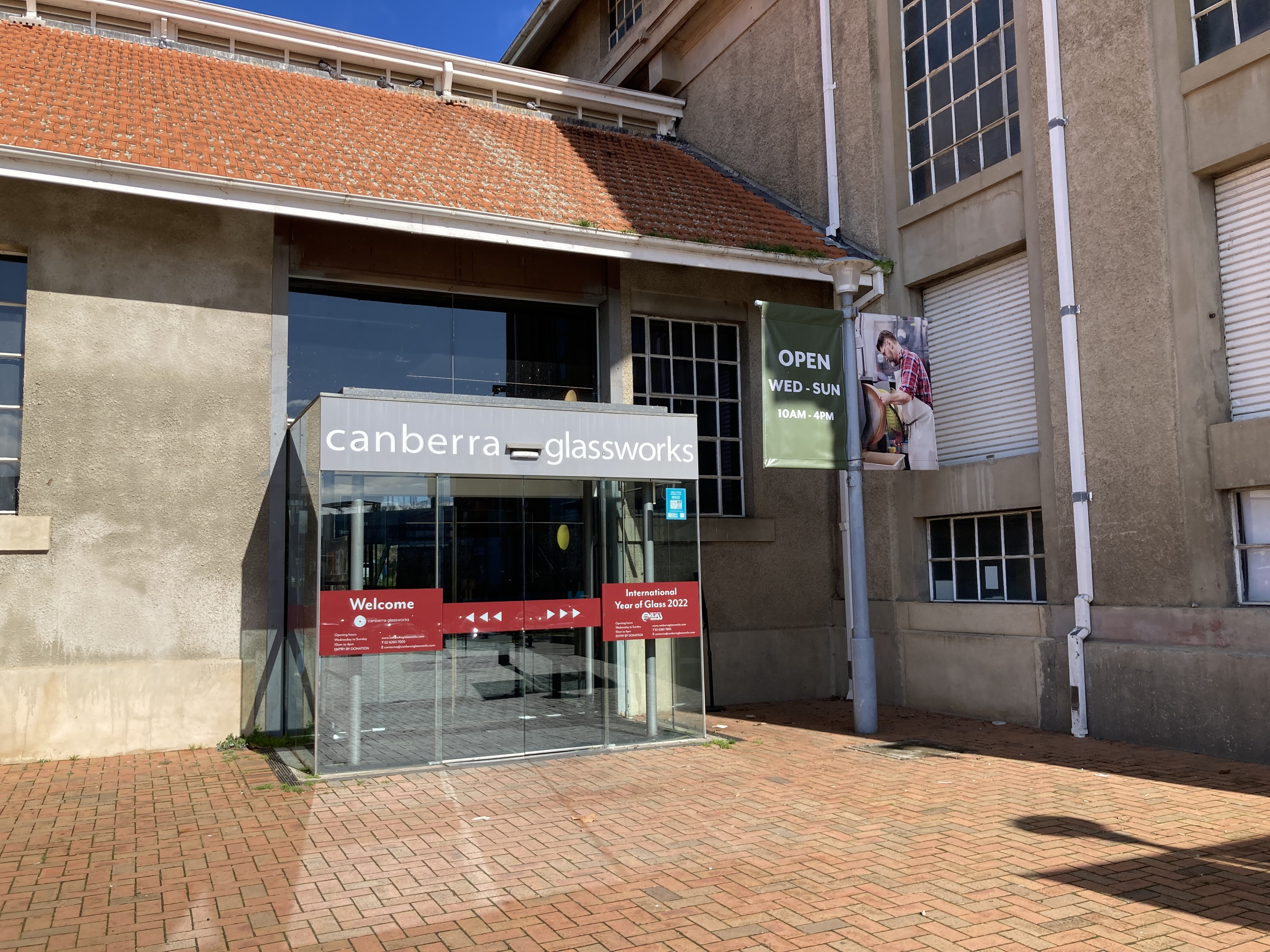
- Entrance to Canberra Glassworks
- Formation: 31 December 2005; 20 years ago
- Type: Charity
- Purpose: Glasswork
- Location: Canberra, Australia
- Coordinates: 35.3115975°S 149.1436952°E
- Chief executive: Elizabeth Rogers
- Website: canberraglassworks.com

Canberra Glassworks is an Australian gallery and glass art studio in Canberra. The studio is open to the general public to view the glass artists working. Opened in May 2007 by Jon Stanhope, it is the largest dedicated glass studio facility in Australia.

== History ==
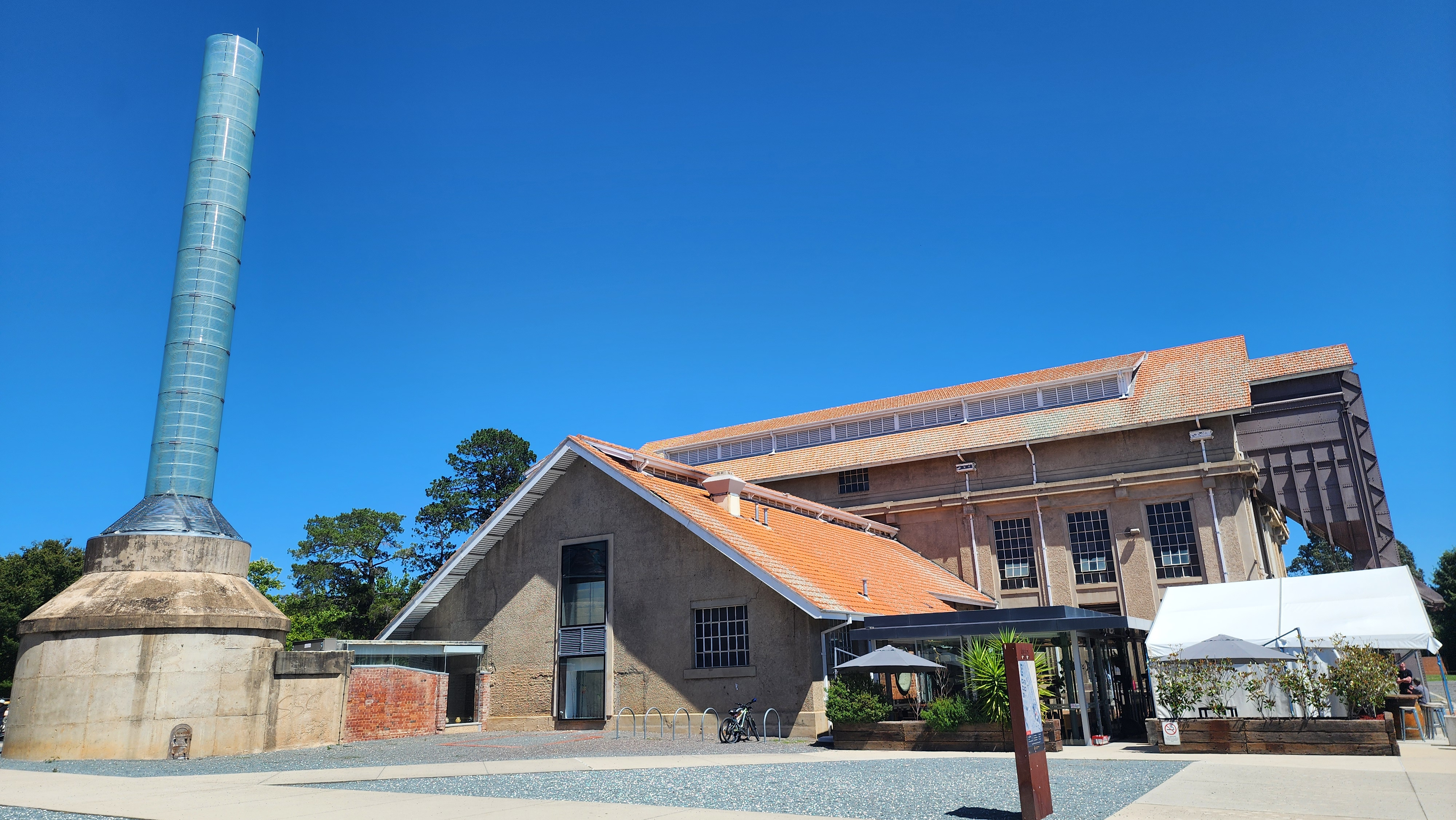
Canberra Glassworks Facility

The centre is strongly linked with the ANU School of Art Glass Workshop, whose founding workshop head Klaus Moje was pivotal in establishing the centre. Jon Stanhope, Chief Minister of the ACT and Minister for the Arts, announced the name of the new centre in late 2005, specifically to highlight Canberra as a being potentially well reputed both nationally and internationally for studio glass and the term glassworks to be clear about what equipment and facilities where available at the centre to artists as well as to the general public.

The Glassworks is located in the Kingston Powerhouse, which was designed by John Smith Murdoch, constructed from 1913-1915, and is a historical landmark. The power station generated electricity until 1957, and is Canberra's oldest public building. Particular effort was made to preserve the original building and surroundings where possible, and the new facility was developed within a framework of Ecologically Sustainable Design (ESD). The creation of Glassworks and renovation of this building was part of the redevelopment of the lake foreshore surrounding Kingston.

The centre was originally scheduled to be opened in September 2006, but was opened in May 2007 by Jon Stanhope.

Glass artist Clare Belfrage was creative director from 2009 to 2013.

== Description and governance ==
Canberra Glassworks is the largest dedicated glass studio facility in Australia.

Elizabeth Rogers was appointed new chief executive from October 2021. Before starting in this role, she had led Regional Arts NSW for 15 years.

== Public outreach ==
The studio contains a public viewing gallery above the main hotshop areas as well as public access walkways around all glass working areas.

Glassworks offers courses to non-practising artists and members of the public, as well as students. The studio also offers members of the general public to commission works through artists working at the studio. In addition there are rotating art displays featuring multiple different styles of glassworking.

== Photos ==
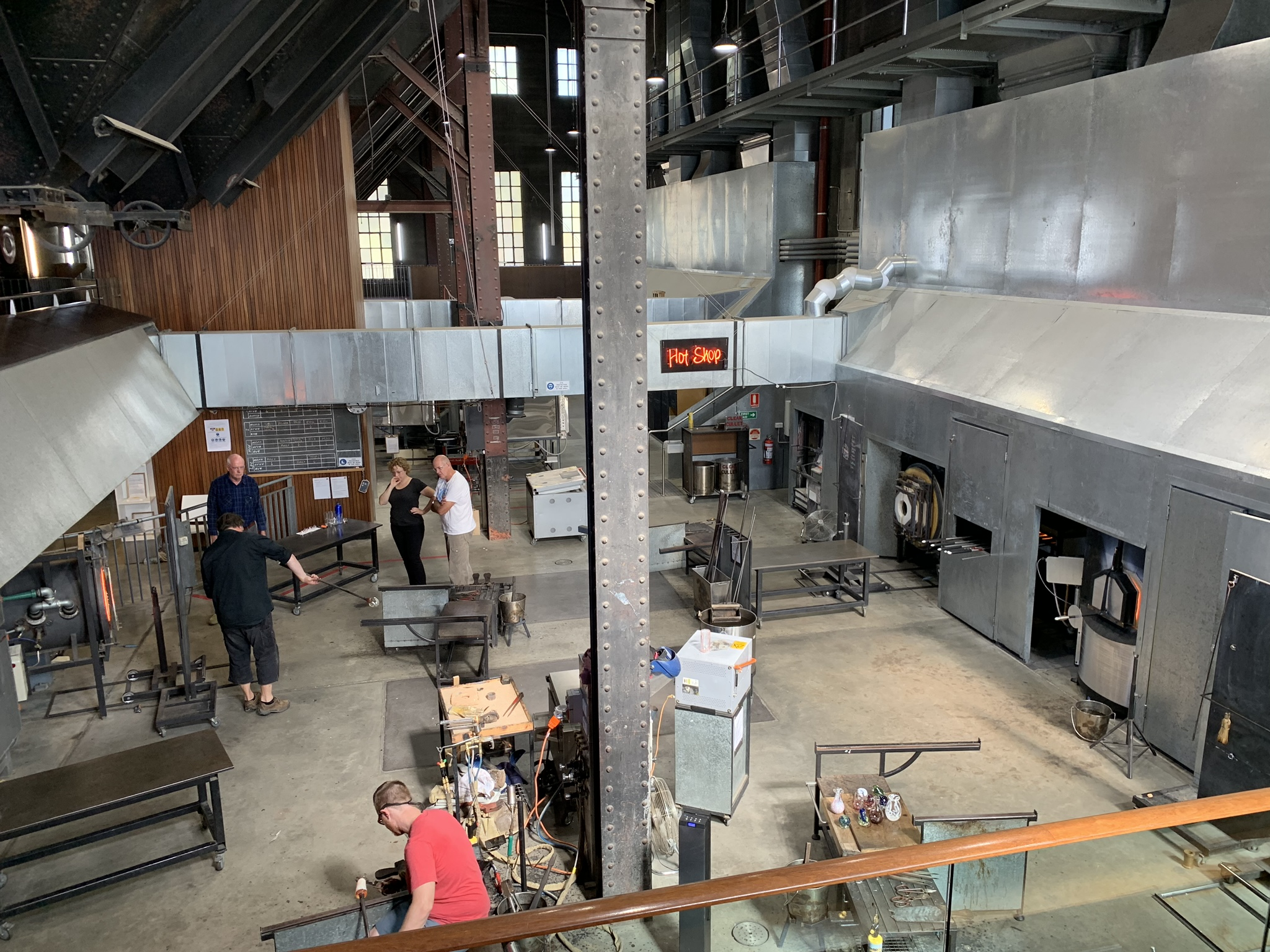
Canberra Glassworks workshop

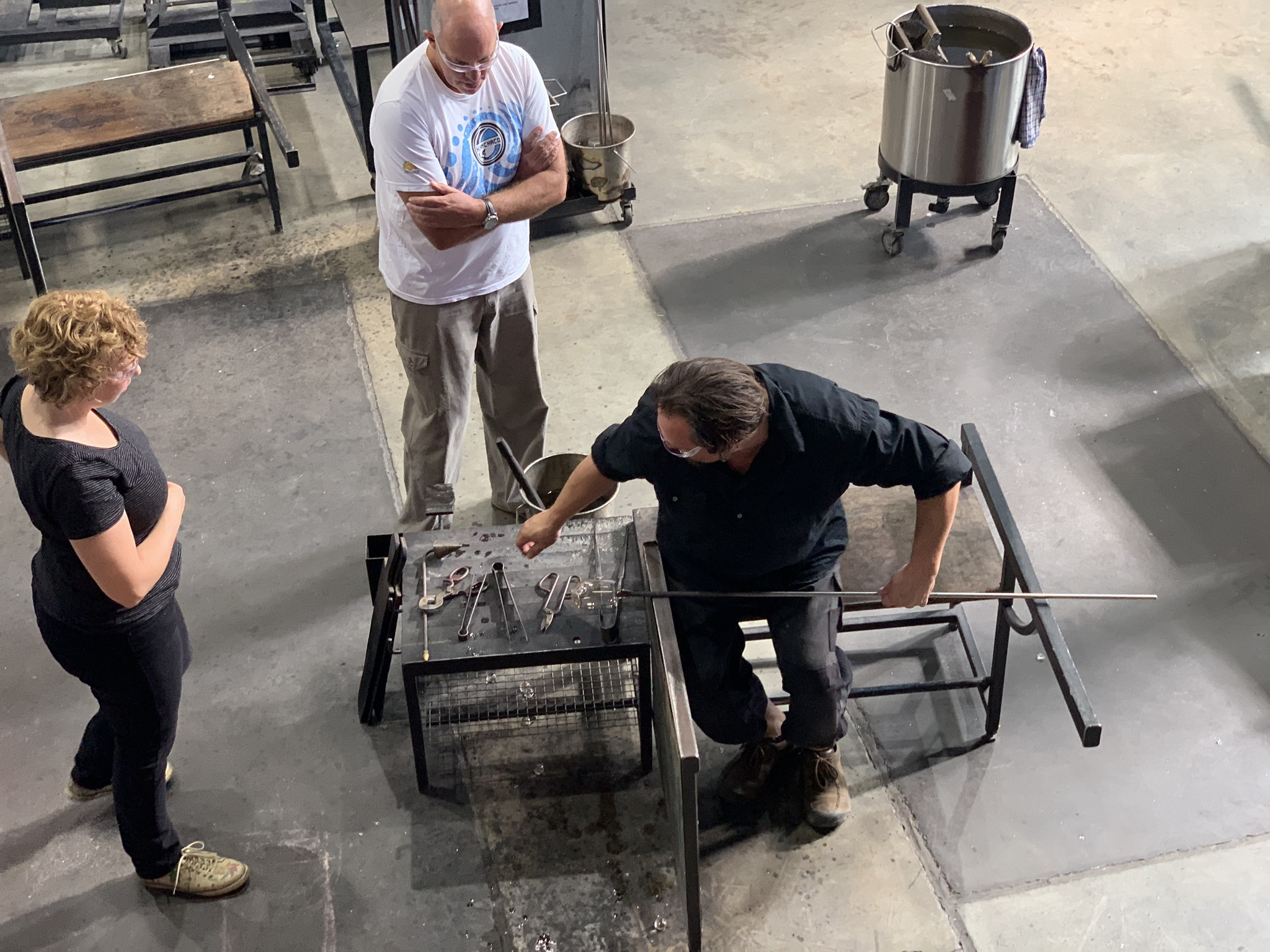
Glasswork class in the workshop

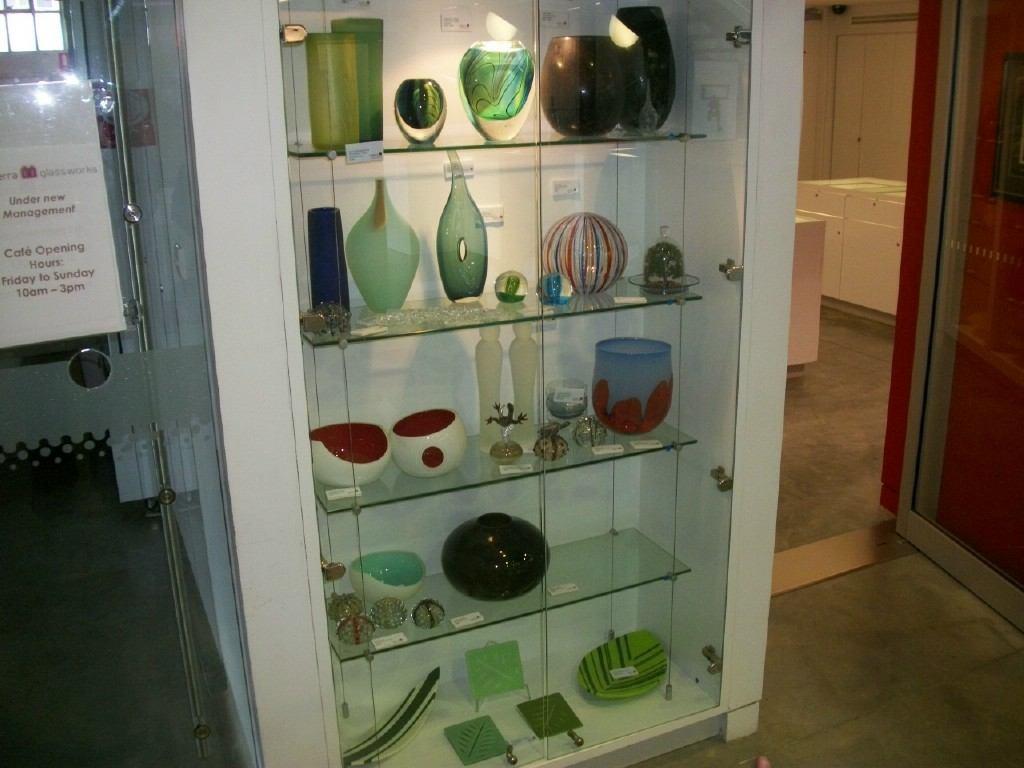
A display at the Glassworks

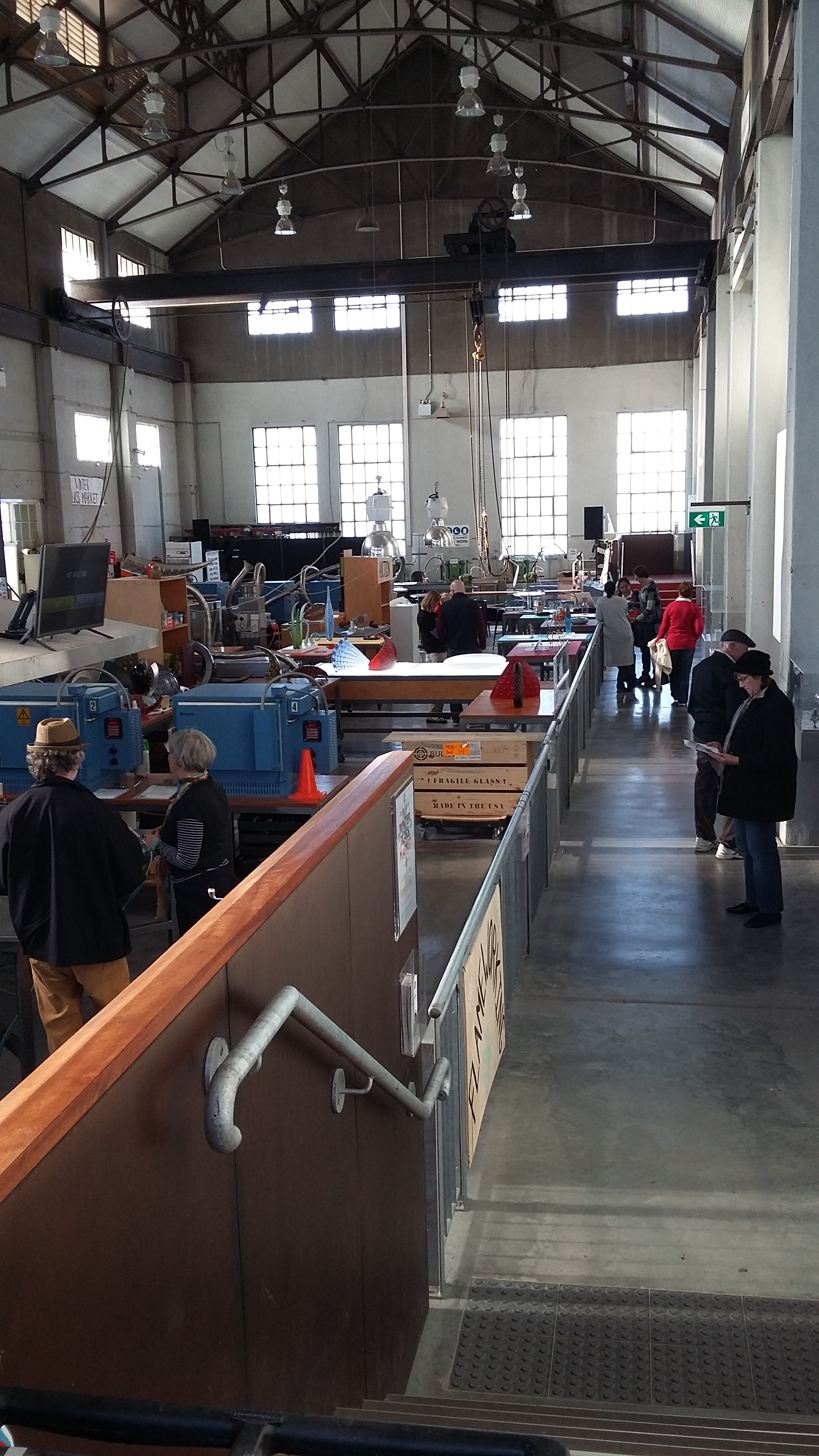
Workshop materials
