= Frances Stewart Higgins =

American glass artist

Frances Higgins
- Born: Frances Stewart; December 24, 1912; Haddock, Georgia
- Died: February 12, 2004 (aged 91); Riverside, Illinois
- Known for: Art glass
- Spouse: Michael Higgins

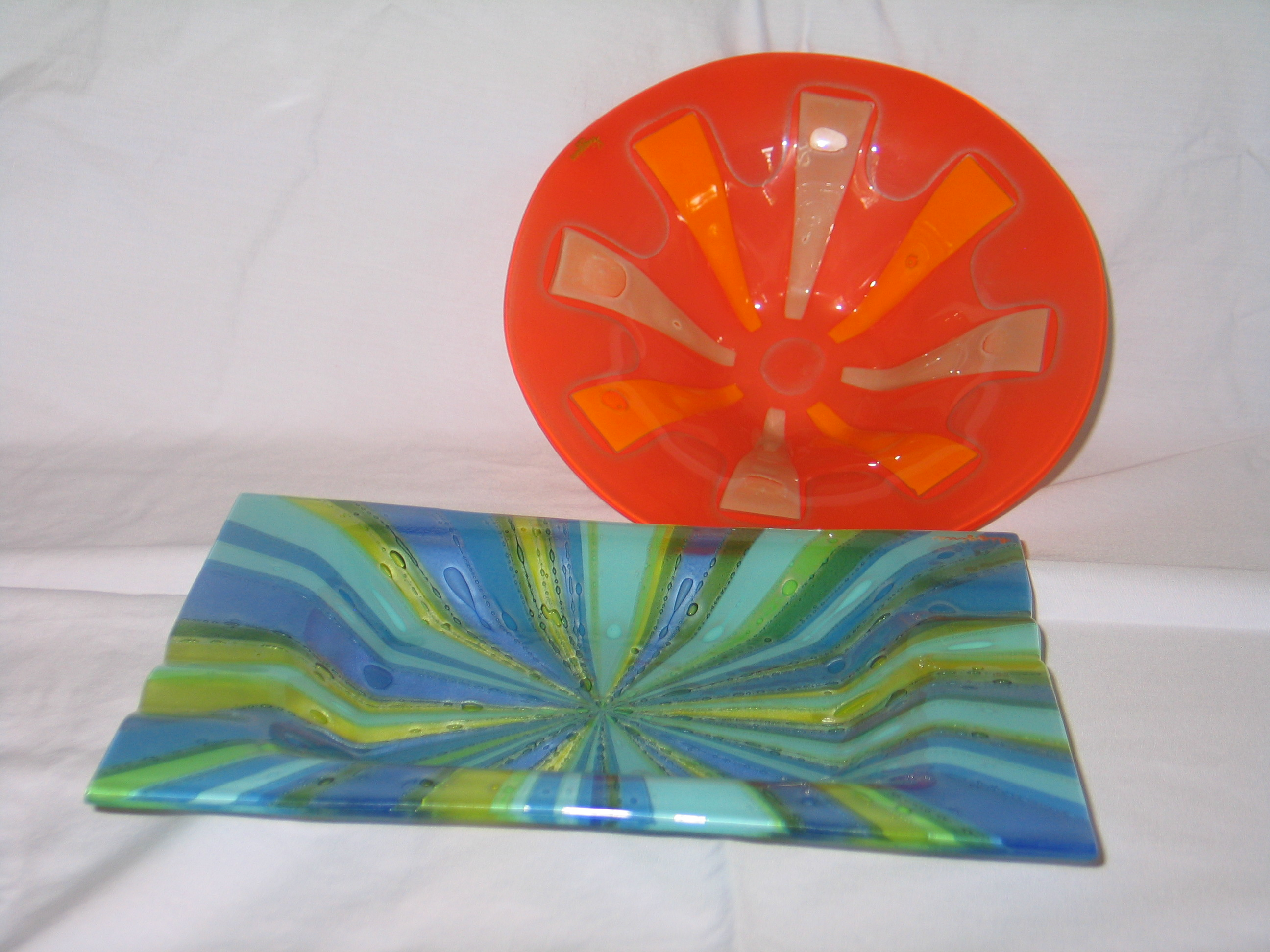
Work from the Higgins Glass Studio

Frances Higgins (1912 – 2004) was an American glass artist. She is best known for establishing the Higgins Glass studio with her husband Michael Higgins.

Higgins née Stewart was born on December 24, 1912, in Haddock, Georgia. She attended Georgia State College for Women and went on to teach at the University of Georgia. She relocated to Chicago where she studied at the Institute of Design for her MFA. There she met fellow artist Michael Higgins who was a teacher at the institute.

The couple married in 1948. They worked together out of their Chicago apartment creating fused enameled glass. The eventually moved to a larger space where they lived above their studio on N. Wells Street in Chicago. They created tableware using a technique of enameling, fusing, and slumping glass.

In 1966 they moved their studio to Riverside, Illinois. Higgins died on February 12, 2004, in Riverside, Illinois. In 1990 she was named a Fellow of the American Craft Council. Her work is in the Corning Museum of Glass, and the Smithsonian American Art Museum.
