= Te Rongo Kirkwood =

New Zealand artist (born 1973)

- Born: 1973; Auckland, New Zealand
- Known for: Fused glass
- Website: terongokirkwood.com

Te Rongo Kirkwood (born 1973) is an artist from Auckland, New Zealand. She is known for her glass art, particularly in fused and slumped glass.

== Career ==
Kirkwood credits her initial interest in glass art to meeting renowned glass artist Danny Lane in the United Kingdom. When she returned to New Zealand, her interest grew, but with two young children, she was not able to attend a formal multi-year course in glass art at a university. She purchased a glass kiln and began to learn independently.

Kirkwood's works have won recognition in a range of competitions and exhibitions. Her work was selected for inclusion in the Bombay Sapphire Blue Room exhibition in 2007, and for a Matariki-themed exhibition organised by Manukau City Council in 2009. In 2009 she won the Auckland Royal Easter Show art awards in the glass art category with her 'Puawai' piece. In 2014 and 2012, she was selected as a finalist in the Australian Ranamok Glass Prize

She has also contributed to the Project Twin Streams project in Waitakere by producing a major artwork near the pathway at Millbrook Esplanade. Her glass sculpture 'Te Aho Maumahara – Sacred Strand of Memories' hangs in the community area of the Devonport Library.

In 2014, her work was exhibited in the group show Te Hau A Uru: A Message from the West at Te Uru Waitakere Contemporary Gallery alongside artists Rebecca Baumann, Philip Dadson, Brett Graham, Lisa Reihana and Tanya Ruka. Between June 2015 and February 2016, Kirkwood's Ka Awatea series, previously displayed at Pataka Art + Museum in 2012, was exhibited at the De Young Fine Arts Museum in San Francisco. In June 2016, Kōrero Mai, Kōrero Atu, featuring the work of Kirkwood and jeweller Areta Wilkinson opened at the Auckland War Memorial Museum.

== Exhibitions ==
=== Solo ===
- Ka Awatea, Pataka Art + Museum, Porirua, 2012
- Nga Kakahu Karaihe, Milford Galleries, Dunedin, 11 April – 6 May 2015
- Ka Awatea, De Young (museum), San Francisco, CA, January 2014 – February 2016
- Kōrero Mai, Kōrero Atu: Artists Areta Wilkinson and Te Rongo Kirkwood at Auckland Museum, Auckland War Memorial Museum, Auckland, 1 July – 11 September 2016
- As Above, So Below, Milford Galleries, Dunedin, 22 April – 17 May 2017

=== Group ===
- Te Hau a Uru: A Message from the West, Te Uru Waitakere Contemporary Gallery, Auckland, 1 November – 7 December 2014

== Personal life ==
Kirkwood is of Māori and Scots ancestry. She affiliates with Waikato, Taranaki, Te Wai-o-Hua, Te Kawerau and Ngāi Tai ki Tamaki iwi.

== Gallery ==
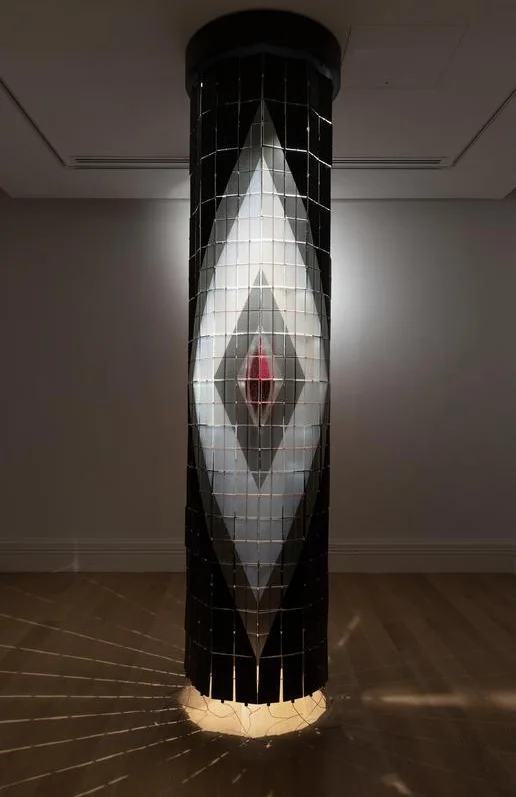
Eunoia (2020) at the Auckland Art Gallery

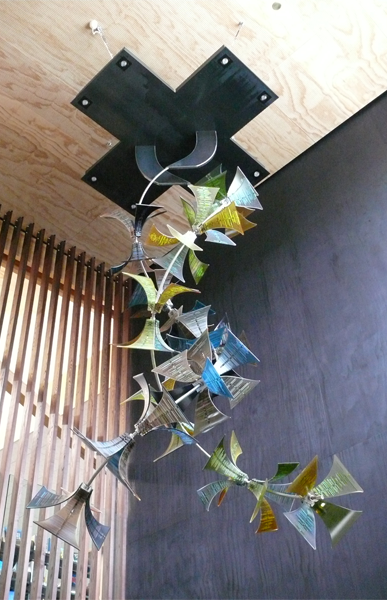
Te Aho Maumahara (2015) at the Devonport Library, North Shore

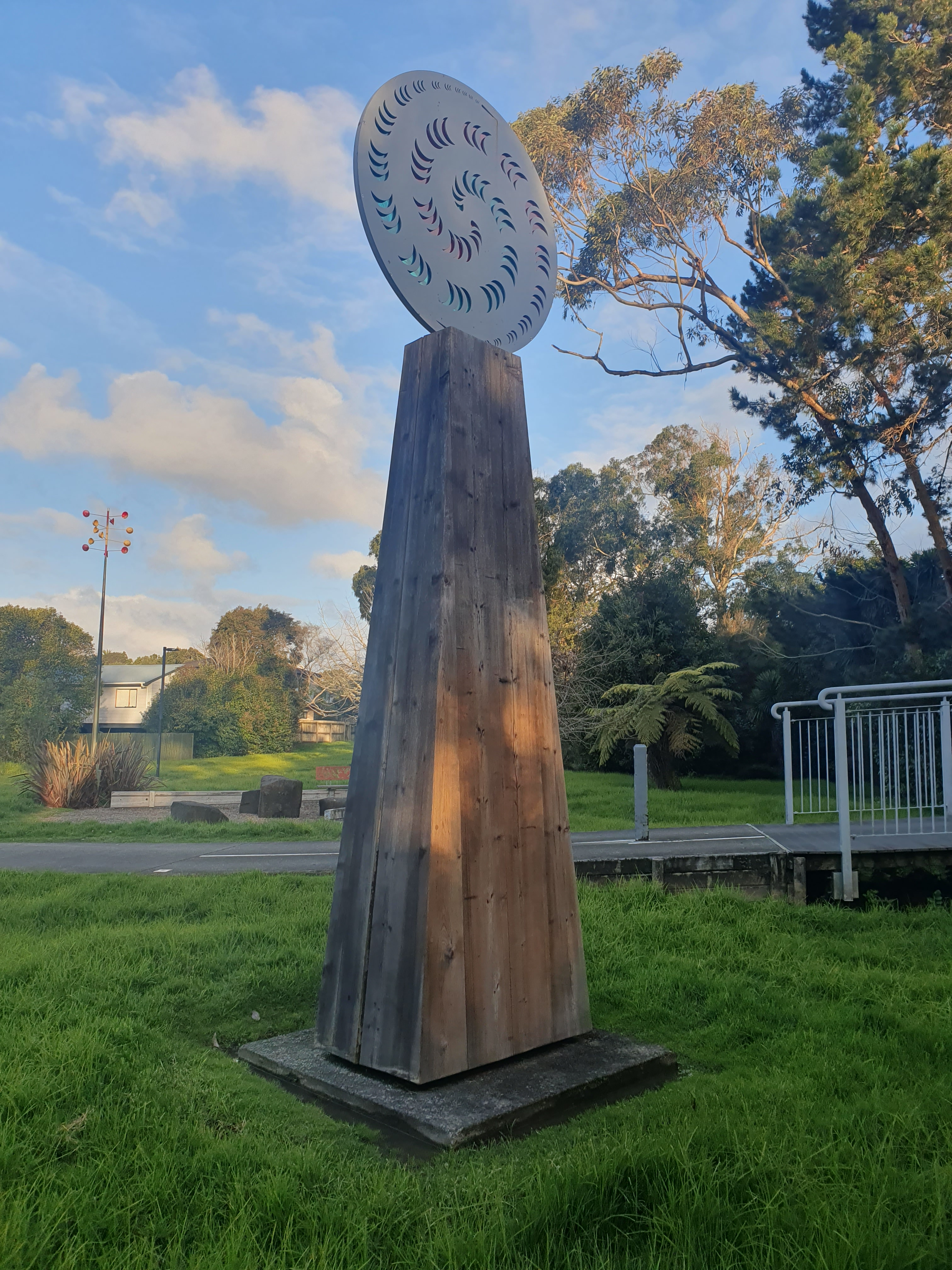
Te Whakakitenga (The Vision) (2010) in Sunnyvale, West Auckland
