= Devitrification =

Crystallization in a formerly crystal-free (amorphous) glass

Devitrification is the process of crystallization in a formerly crystal-free (amorphous) glass. The term is derived from the Latin vitreus, meaning glassy and transparent.

== Devitrification in glass art ==
Devitrification occurs in glass art during the firing process of fused glass whereby the surface of the glass develops a whitish scum, crazing, or wrinkles instead of a smooth glossy shine, as the molecules in the glass change their structure into that of crystalline solids. While this condition is normally undesired, in glass art it is possible to use devitrification as a deliberate artistic technique.

Causes of devitrification, commonly referred to as "devit", can include holding a high temperature for too long, which causes the nucleation of crystals. The presence of foreign residue such as dust on the surface of the glass or inside the kiln prior to firing can provide nucleation points where crystals can propagate easily. The chemical compositions of some types of glass can make them more vulnerable to devitrification than others, for example a high lime content can be factor in inducing this condition. In general opaque glass can devit easily as crystals are present in the glass to give its opaque appearance and thus the higher the chance it might devit.

Techniques for avoiding devitrification include cleaning the glass surfaces of dust or unwanted residue, and allowing rapid cooling once the piece reaches the desired temperature, until the temperature approaches the annealing temperature. Devit spray can be purchased to apply to the surfaces of the glass pieces prior to firing which is supposed to help prevent devitrification, however there is disagreement over the long term effectiveness of this solution and whether it should be used as a substitute for proper firing techniques.

Once devit has occurred, there are techniques that can be attempted to fix it, with varying degrees of success. One technique is to cover the surface with a sheet of clear glass and refiring. Since devitrification can change the COE somewhat, and devitrified glass tends to be somewhat harder to melt again, there is the possibility of this technique resulting in a less stable piece, however it has also been used effectively with full-fused pieces with no apparent problems. Applying devit spray and refiring can also be effective. Alternatively, sandblasting, acid bath, or polishing with a pumice stone or rotary brush can be used to remove the unwanted surface.

== Devitrification in geology ==
In a general sense, any crystallization from a magma could be considered devitrification, but the term is most commonly used for the formation of spherulites in otherwise glassy rocks such as obsidian.

The process of conversion of glass material to crystallized material is known as devitrification. Spherulites are evidence of this process. Perlite is due to hydration of glass causing expansion and not necessarily devitrification.

== Glass wool ==
Devitrification can occur in glass wool used in high-temperature applications, resulting in the formation of potentially carcinogenic mineral powders.
