= Dichroic glass =

Glass which displays different colors under different lighting conditions

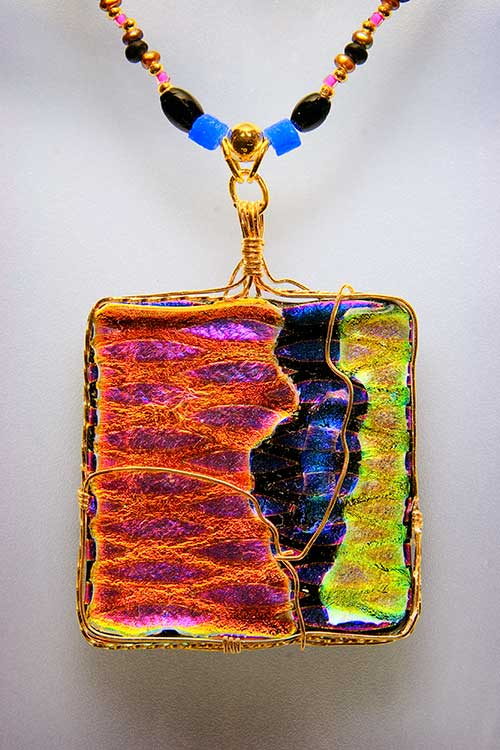
A pendant made from modern dichroic glass

Dichroic glass is glass which can display multiple different colors depending on lighting conditions.

One dichroic material is a modern composite non-translucent glass that is produced by stacking layers of metal oxides which give the glass shifting colors depending on the angle of view, causing an array of colors to be displayed as an example of thin-film optics. The resulting glass is used for decorative purposes such as stained glass, jewelry and other forms of glass art. The commercial title of "dichroic" can also display three or more colors (trichroic) and even iridescence in some cases. The term dichroic is used more precisely when labelling interference filters for laboratory use.

Another dichroic glass material first appeared in a few pieces of Roman glass from the 4th century and consists of a translucent glass containing colloidal gold and silver particles dispersed in the glass matrix in certain proportions so that the glass has the property of displaying a particular transmitted color and a completely different reflected color, as certain wavelengths of light either pass through or are reflected. In ancient dichroic glass, as seen in the most famous piece, the 4th-century Lycurgus Cup in the British Museum, the glass has a green color when lit from in front in reflected light, and another, purple-ish red, when lit from inside or behind the cup so that the light passes through the glass. This is not due to alternating thin metal films but colloidal silver and gold particles dispersed throughout the glass, in an effect similar to that seen in gold ruby glass, though that has only one color whatever the lighting. The ancient novel Leucippe and Clitophon by Achilles Tatius describes a similar vessel that shifts color from green to red.

== Invention ==
The 4th-century Lycurgus Cup as it appears when back-lit and when front-lit, respectively

Modern dichroic glass is available as a result of materials research carried out by NASA and its contractors, who developed it for use in dichroic filters. However, color changing glass dates back to at least the 4th century AD, though only very few pieces, mostly fragments, survive. It was also made in the Renaissance in Venice and by imitators elsewhere; these pieces are also rare.

== Manufacture of modern dichroic glass ==
Multiple ultra-thin layers of transparent oxides of such metals as titanium, chromium, aluminium, zirconium, or magnesium; or silica are vaporised by an electron beam in a vacuum chamber. The vapor then condenses on the surface of the glass in the form of a crystal structure. A protective layer of quartz crystal is sometimes added. Other variants of such physical vapor deposition (PVD) coatings are also possible. The finished glass can have as many as 30 to 50 layers of these materials, yet the thickness of the total coating is approximately 30 to 35 millionths of an inch (about 760 to 890 nm). The coating that is created is very similar to a gemstone and, by careful control of thickness, different colors may be obtained.

The total light that hits the dichroic layer equals the wavelengths reflected plus the wavelengths passing through the dichroic layer.

A plate of dichroic glass can be fused with other glass in multiple firings. Due to variations in the firing process, individual results can never be exactly predicted, so each piece of fused dichroic glass is unique. Over 45 colours of dichroic coatings are available to be placed on any glass substrate.

== Uses ==
=== Optics ===
Dichroic glass is used in various dichroic optical filters to select narrow bands of spectral colors, for example in fluorescence microscopy, LCD projectors, or 3D movies.

=== Artists ===
Dichroic glass is now available to artists through dichroic coating manufacturers. Glass artists often refer to dichroic glass as "dichro".

Images can be formed by removing the dichroic coating from parts of the glass, creating everything from abstract patterns to letters, animals, or faces. The standard method for precision removal of the coating involves a laser.

Dichroic glass is specifically designed to be hotworked but can also be used in its raw form. Sculpted glass elements that have been shaped by extreme heat and then fused together may also be coated with dichroic afterwards to make them reflect an array of colors.

=== Architecture ===
The corporate headquarters of Amazon.com in Seattle, Washington, incorporates dichroic glass into the exterior of its high-rise building, reflecting light into various colors that depend on the time of day.

The Museum at Prairiefire in Overland Park, Kansas, which opened in May 2014, is devoted primarily to natural history. It borrows displays from larger museums and hosts at least two major traveling exhibits per year. Its striking glass exterior was designed to reference the intentional prairie fires that were an integral part of farming life in Kansas. The glass is dichroic, which means that its color changes with the light of the day. The museum is itself a work of art.
