= Annealing temperature =

Annealing temperature may refer to:

- Annealing (glass)
- Annealing (metallurgy)
- Polymerase chain reaction
