= Jessica Loughlin =

Australian glass artist (born 1975)

Jessica Loughlin (born 1975) is an Australian glass artist based in Adelaide, South Australia. Her kiln-formed glasswork is included in collections in Australia and worldwide.

== Early life and education ==
Jessica Loughlin was born in Melbourne, Victoria, in 1975.

She completed a Bachelor of Arts with honours at Canberra School of Art at the Australian National University in 1997, where she studied under Stephen Procter.

== Career and art practice ==
Loughlin started her studio practice in 1998, and was soon well known in the new generation of glass artists of the 2000s. She began by exploring the horizon line in her student years, subsequently becoming interested in "capturing the transient qualities of light and the quiet sense of contemplation it provokes in the viewer".

She is based in Adelaide, South Australia, and her work is said to be "influenced by the flat landscapes and salt lakes" of parts of the state.Working in kiln-formed glass, she uses a restricted colour palette.

In her own words:

My work investigates space, seeing distance and understanding how wide-open spaces, particularly of the Australian landscape, affect us. I am fascinated by the unreachable space. The view we look upon, but can never reach. In this minimal landscape, all elements are stripped back, light becomes the landscape, and I am left looking at space, the space between here.…and there... My work does not aim to represent this landscape directly but rather induce a state of looking inward and outward simultaneously.

== Recognition and awards ==
- 1997: Winner, RFC Award (later renamed Ranamok Glass Prize), Resource Finance Corporation, Australia
- 2001: "Outstanding New Artist in Glass" in Urban Glass Award, New York City
- 2004: Winner, Tom Malone Prize, Art Gallery of Western Australia
- 2007: Winner, Tom Malone Prize, Art Gallery of Western Australia
- 2018: Winner, FUSE Glass Prize, JamFactory, Adelaide
- 2020: Finalist, Loewe Craft Prize, Musée des Arts Décoratifs, Paris, France
- 2022: Selected to be the focus of the solo exhibition in the JamFactory's Icon series of exhibitions

== Exhibitions ==
Loughlin's work has been exhibited many times, both nationally and internationally.

=== Group ===
- 1999: Australian Studio Glass, Galeria Nova Imagem, Lisbon; Glass Museum of Marinha Grande, Portugal
- 2000: 28th International Glass Invitational, Habatat Galleries, Pontiac, Michigan, US
- 2006: Open Space 16 (2005) was included Transformations : The language of craft, at the National Gallery of Australia
- 2024: Adelaide Biennial of Australian Art at the Art Gallery of South Australia, Adelaide

=== Solo ===
(selected)

- 2000: Bullseye Connections Gallery, SOFA, International Art Expo, New York City
- 2003: Heller Gallery, New York City, US
- 2004: Sanske Galerie, Zurich, Switzerland
- 2009: Expanse, Bullseye Connections Gallery, Oregon, US
- 2021: Architetture di Luce, Caterina Tognon, Venice, Italy
- 2022: Jessica Loughlin: Of Light, JamFactory Icon series, then touring nationally until 2025
- 2023: near | far, Sabbia Gallery, Sydney

== Collections ==
Loughlin's work is represented in many galleries, including:

- Art Gallery of Western Australia, Perth, WA
- Australian Catholic University
- Corning Museum of Glass, NY USA
- Glasmuseum, Ebeltoft, Denmark
- Glass Museum of Marinha Grande, Portugal
- Hamilton Regional Art Gallery, Victoria
- Mobile Museum of Art, Mobile, Alabama, US
- Musée de design et d'arts appliqués contemporains, Lausanne, Switzerland
- National Gallery of Australia
- National Glass Collection, Wagga Wagga, Australia
- National Museums Scotland, Edinburgh
- New Mexico Museum of Art, USA
- Queensland Art Gallery
- Victoria and Albert Museum, London, UK
