= Michael Higgins (glass artist) =

American glass artist

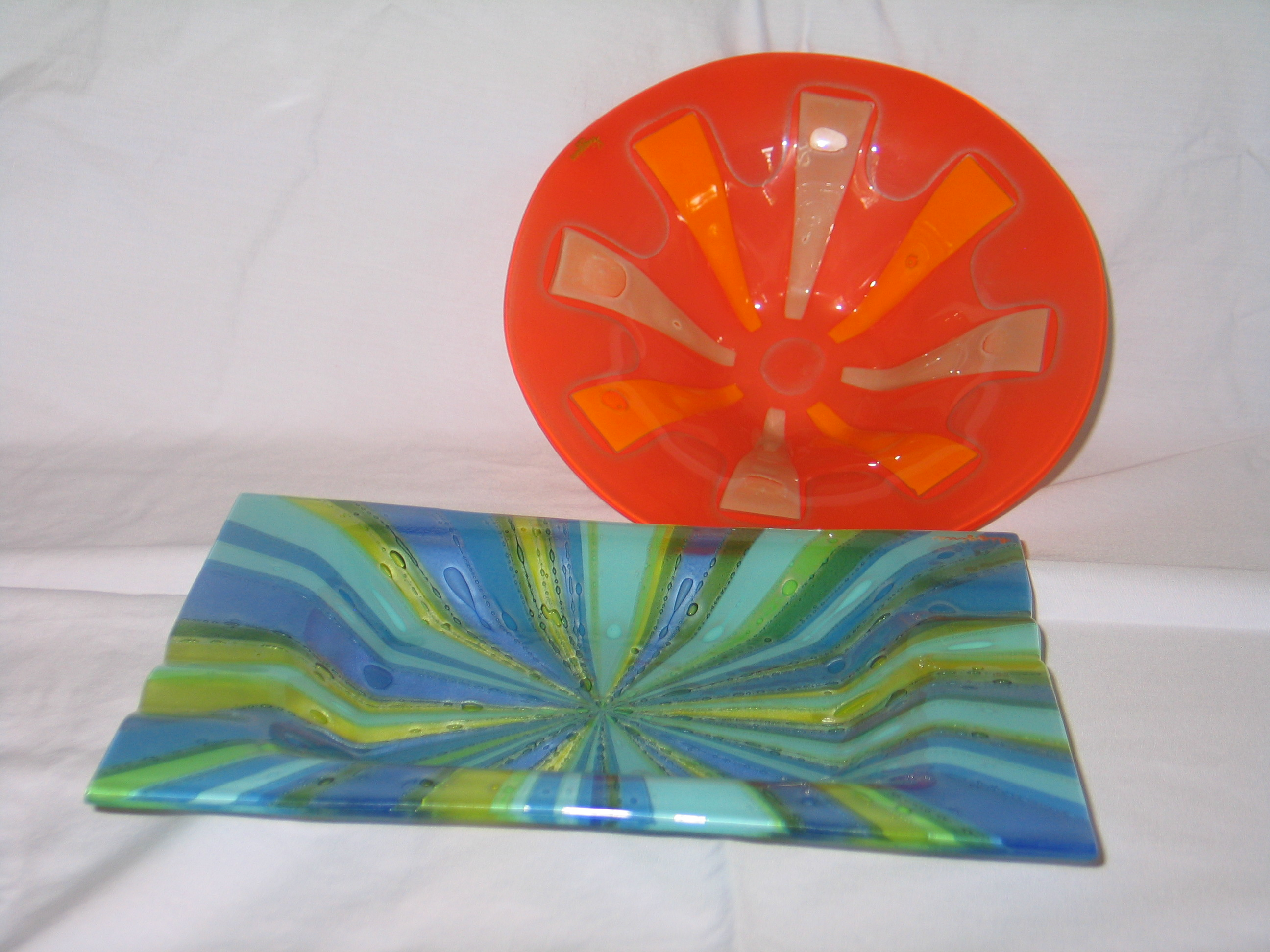
Work from the Higgins Glass studio

Michael Higgins (September 29, 1908 in London – February 13, 1999 in Riverside, Illinois) was an American glass artist.

== Life ==
He was a King's Scholar at Eton College, and studied at Cambridge University, and the London Central School of Arts and Crafts. Emigrating to the US in 1939, he worked as a Lend-Lease programmer for India during World War II. Following the war, he became Head of Visual Design at the Chicago Institute of Design, where one of his students was Frances Stewart. He married Frances in 1948, and together they founded the Higgins Glass studio.

His work is in the Renwick Gallery. His papers are at the Archives of American Art.
