= Cobi Cockburn =

Australian glass artist

Cobi Cockburn is an Australian glass artist.

== Early life and education ==
Cobi Cockburn is from New South Wales.

She completed a Bachelor of Visual Arts (2000) and a Master of Fine Arts (2016) at Sydney College of the Arts. She is also a graduate of the Glass Workshop with a Bachelor of Visual Arts (Hons) (2006) from the Australian National University in Canberra.

== Career ==
Cockburn creates glass artworks. She works in response to her environment and the landscape, notably around Canberra and the Shoalhaven area.

== Recognition and awards ==
- 2006: Ranamok Glass Prize
- 2007: Lino Tagliapietra Prize at Talente 2007 in Germany, a competition for emerging designers (under 35), organised as part of the International Trades Fair in Munich
- 2007: Emerge, US
- 2009: Tom Malone Prize from the Art Gallery of Western Australia
- 2011–12: Joint artist-in-residence with Charles Butcher at Tylee Cottage in Whanganui, New Zealand, in 2011–12.
- 2015: Tom Malone Prize
- 2020: FUSE Glass Prize

== Collections ==
Her works are held in the Art Gallery of Western Australia, Palm Springs Art Museum and the Corning Museum of Glass, New York.
