= Haddock, Georgia =

- Unincorporated community
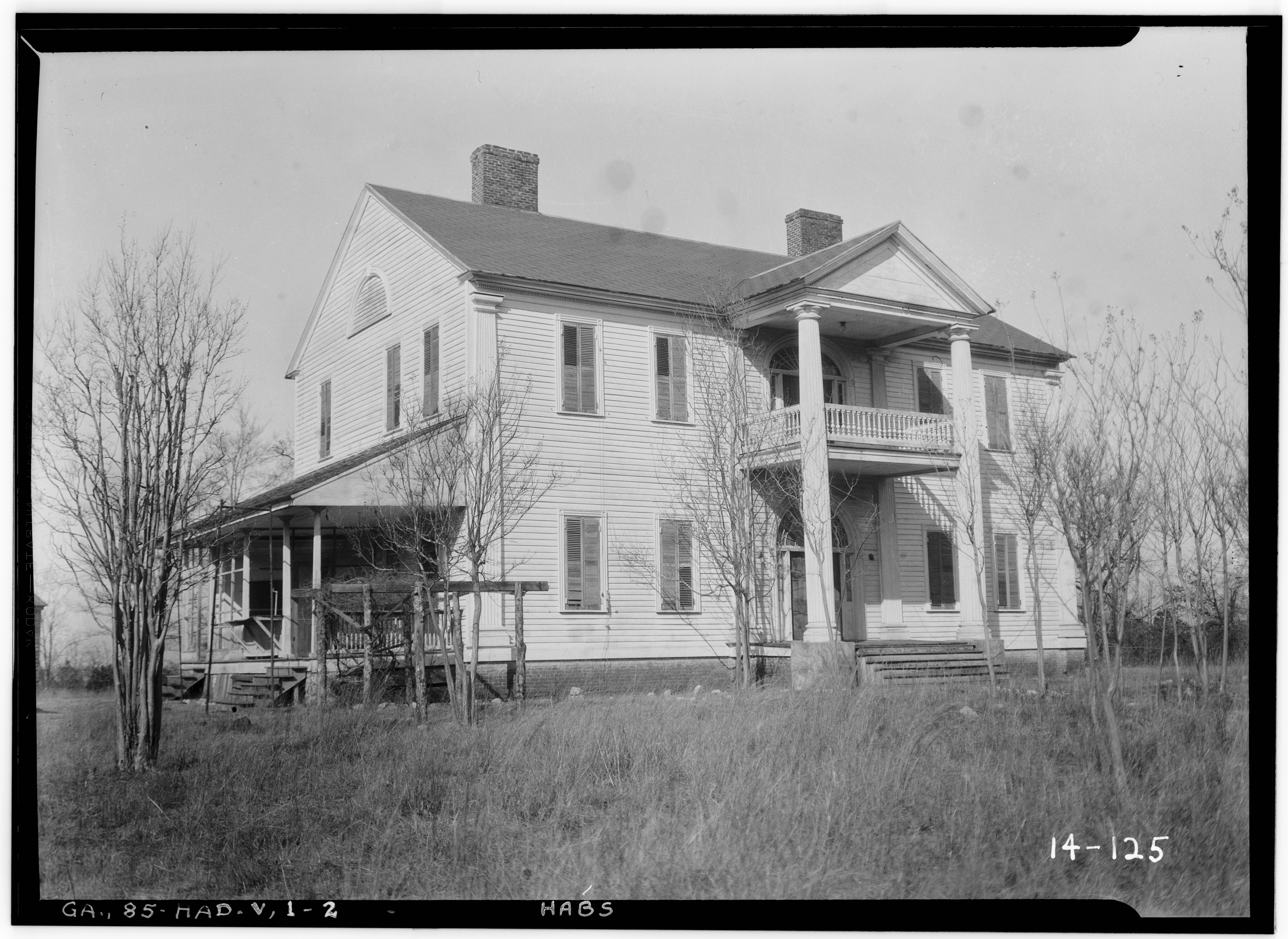
- Blount House in Haddock in 1934

- Location within Georgia Location within the United States
- Coordinates: 33°1′57″N 83°25′45″W
- Country: United States
- State: Georgia
- County: Jones
- Elevation: 499 ft (152 m)
- Time zone: UTC-5 (Eastern (EST))
  - Summer (DST): UTC-4 (EDT)
- ZIP codes: 31033
- GNIS feature ID: 356133

Haddock (also known as Haddocks Station) is an unincorporated community in Jones County, Georgia, United States. It lies along State Route 22, to the east of the city of Gray, the county seat. Its elevation is 499 feet (152 m). It has a post office with the ZIP code 31033.

Haddock is named for the Haddock family, who owned a large plantation in the area. It was once an incorporated town (1905) with schools, a train station, a saw mill, a bank, and a canning factory. The town had its beginnings in the 1870s. Prior to this there were trading posts with nearby Indian Territory. Most of the businesses are now closed and it is primarily a bedroom community to Macon and Milledgeville. Haddock is part of the Macon Metropolitan Statistical Area.

== Notable people ==
- Walter Morgan, professional golfer, winner of three Senior PGA Tour events
- George Stallings, Major League Baseball player and manager, died in Haddock
- Don Patterson (defensive back), professional football player
- Frances Stewart Higgins, glass artist

== Bibliography ==
- "History of Jones County, Georgia" by C.W. Williams, Burke C., Macon Ga., 1957.
- "Milledgeville" by J.C. Bonner, Old Capital Press, Milledgeville Ga., 2007.
