= Tom Moore (artist) =

Australian glass artist (born 1971)

Tom Moore (born 1971) is an Australian glass artist based in Adelaide, South Australia. He is known for his quirky glass sculptures, many of which include animals. His work is featured in prominent public galleries, and he has won several prizes for his work, including the major Australian prize for glass art, the FUSE Glass Prize, in 2024.

== Early life and education ==
Tom Moore was born in 1971 in Canberra.

He initially thought that his creativity would express itself in clay sculptures, but after witnessing three glass artists "juggling fire" at an open day at Canberra School of Art, decided to change course. He graduated from the Canberra School of Art at the Australian National University in 1994. He then moved to Adelaide, where he underwent training in production techniques at JamFactory until 1997.

Moore was awarded a PhD in visual art, specialising in hot glass sculpture, from the University of South Australia for his thesis "Agents of Incongruity: Glassmaking embraces nonsense to navigate monsters, wonder and dread" in 2019. His thesis looked at practical investigations of glass and mixed media, and also focused on hybrid lifeforms and Anthropocene.

== Career ==
After completing his training at JamFactory in 1997, Moore worked as production manager in its glass studio until around 2012.

As part of the Adelaide Biennial in February 2016, Moore's large work of public art, an inflatable sculpture titled Magnified Planktonic Self was mounted on a plinth in front of the Art Gallery of South Australia (AGSA). Concurrently, his glass works were displayed at the Museum of Economic Botany and AGSA. The large work was based on a small glass sculpture.

=== Style and themes ===
Moore's work is often described as "comical", "quirky", and "idiosyncratic". His art frequently features things or animals stacked on top of each other. His work is inspired by the sculpture of the Town Musicians of Bremen in Bremen, Germany, in which a rooster stands atop a cat, on a dog standing on a donkey, based on a fairy tale of the same name from Grimms' Fairy Tales. He also likes the drawings in Dr Seuss's Cat in the Hat, in which the cat stacks a whole lot of things precariously on top of each other. He also likes to deliberately introduce asymmetry or unexpected wobbly lines and to his artworks.

While doing his PhD (2015–2019), Moore developed recurrent motifs such as "native Australian animals like kookaburras and kangaroos, set near, alongside, or on top of a contradictory assembly of cars, flames, flowers and grass".

He learnt the technique used by Venetian glass-blowers, whereby coloured glass is embedded in molten clear glass and then stretched out until it is thin and long, forming rods. He uses sections of the rods in his works.

== Other activities ==
As of December 2025, Moore is engaged as an adjunct Adjunct Research Fellow at the South Australian School of Art.

== Recognition and awards ==
- 2013: Ranamok Prize of Contemporary Glass
- 2013: Tom Malone Prize
- 2014: City of Hobart Art Prize
- 2024: FUSE Glass Prize, Australia's richest prize for glass art, for "Dandy Lion among the Antipodes"

== Exhibitions ==
Moore's work has been included in exhibitions at most major state galleries in Australia. A solo exhibition, entitled Abundant Wonder, toured national from 2020 until 2023. The tour began at JamFactory in its city location (October – November 2020), and included JamFactory's Seppeltsfield gallery, the Bay Discovery Centre in Glenelg, and galleries in regional towns such as Wagga Wagga, Bundaberg, Tamworth, and Geelong. A monograph was published to accompany the tour, titled Tom Moore: Abundant Wonder, which included essays by Lisa Slade, Mark Thomson, and Adrian Franklin.

His work was featured in a solo exhibition side by side with fellow Adelaidean glass artist Nick Mount at Sabbia's Sydney Contemporary gallery in September 2025.

== Collections ==
Moore's work is held by many major public collections, including:

- Art Gallery of South Australia
- Art Gallery of Western Australia
- Museum of American Glass, New Jersey, US
- National Gallery of Australia
- Powerhouse Museum, Sydney
- QAGOMA, Brisbane
