= JamFactory =

Design studios in Adelaide with galleries, shops and training facilities

JamFactory (formerly spelt Jam Factory) is a not-for-profit arts organisation which includes training facilities, galleries and shops, located in the West End precinct of Adelaide and on the Seppeltsfield Estate in the Barossa Valley, north of Adelaide. It is supported by the South Australian Government, University of South Australia, and private donors. It was founded in 1973 in an old jam factory in the suburb of St Peters. It runs training courses and specialises in high quality craft and design objects, including furniture, jewellery, ceramics, glass, and metal ware.

== History ==
JamFactory was established as a craft training workshop by the Dunstan government, housed in an old jam factory on Payneham Road, in the suburb of St Peters. It was officially opened in November 1974. It was created as a not-for-profit undertaking, and included areas for making glass, jewellery, textiles, and leather work. It also had a gallery and shop. In the early days, ceramicist Margaret Dodd created her series This woman is not a car at the studios at the back, which used to flood during heavy rain.

The ceramics studio opened in 1979, with Jeff Mincham as creative director (1979-1982), followed by Bronwyn Kemp (1983-1988), Peter Anderson (1989-1990), Stephen Bowers (1990-1999), Neville Assad-Salha (1999-2003), Philip Hart (2006-2008), Robin Best (2008-2010) and Damon Moon (2014-2018).

In 1992 JamFactory moved to a purpose-built building in the West End creative precinct of Adelaide city, on Morphett Street in close proximity to the Lion Arts Centre and Mercury Cinema. At the same time it shifted its focus slightly, with the closure of the textile and leather workshops, and the expansion of the jewellery workshop into a metal design studio. A space for making furniture was created, and wider commercial opportunities pursued.

In 2009 the retail area was refurbished to designs by Khai Liew, and a second shop was opened at Seppeltsfield winery in the Barossa Valley. As part of a major interior refurbishment in 2014, the Adelaide Casino commissioned hand-crafted glass light pendants from a team of 12 artists at the JamFactory, which would be hung from the ceiling of the A$5 million plus SKYroom. Each pendant, worth nearly A$2,000, weighs about 5 kilograms (11 lb).

In July 2017 it received public funding of A$490,000 towards a new retail store and increased production capacity at its West End studios, after having increased its turnover by 55% in the previous five years at both locations. They had increased their staff and also been hiring out the studios to independent artists. The planned purchase of a new 450 kilograms (990 lb) furnace for the glass studio, would increase its capacity by a third. It was also planning to open a new retail store in the North Terrace cultural precinct.

Between 1993 and 2018, JamFactory's funding was managed by Arts South Australia, but under the Marshall government, its governance was moved in 2018 to the Department of Innovation and Skills.

Designers Daniel To and Emma Aiston, who had previously run an arts studio known as "Daniel Emma" together since 2008, took over as creative directors of JamFactory at the beginning of 2019. At the same time, a collaboration between JamFactory and the National Gallery of Victoria’s Melbourne NGV Design store was begun, to retail the "Good Morning" collection of designer homewares.

=== Changes of name ===
JamFactory has been known by a series of names:

- Jam Factory Craft Centre (1973–1986/7)
- Jam Factory Workshops (1986/7–1991/1992)
- Jam Factory Craft and Design Centre (1991/1992–1997)
- JamFactory (briefly Jam Factory) Contemporary Craft and Design (1997–present)

== Description ==
The city location is at 19 Morphett Street, next door to the Mercury Cinema and Lion Arts Centre. Four studios provide programs in ceramics, jewellery-making and fine metalwork, glass-making and furniture-making. There are also independent studio spaces for emerging artists, a shop specialising in high quality craft and design objects. JamFactory also collaborates with other organisations, architects and designers on specially commissioned work and projects. It commissions work, functions as a publisher and runs workshops.

The Seppeltsfield studio and shop opened in 2013 as a regional extension, to support local craftspeople and as a tourism offering. It is housed in an historic 1850s stables building, which has been extensively renovated.

Directors To and Aiston describe JamFactory as "an institution is not only iconic but is a unique place where skilled traditional craftspeople mix their expertise within a curated and design focussed environment which can’t be compared to anything else in the country”.

== Training ==
The JamFactory's Associate Training Program provides training in ceramics, glass, furniture or metal. It comprises a foundation year, with the option to apply for a second year working semi-independently. The course teaches the relevant technical skills necessary for their craft as well as the essential business skills required to run a creative practice. Many alumni, such as Clare Belfrage, creative director of the Canberra Glassworks from 2009 to 2013, have become internationally-known and influential designer-makers.

== People ==
Nick Mount, who was one of the first group of artists to take up glassblowing in Australia in the early 1970s, was appointed head of JamFactory' s Glass Studio in 1994, and led it through the 1990s. Karen Cunningham was creative director of the Glass Studio from 2012 to 2019.

Since 2010 and as of June 2025, the CEO is Brian Parkes. Under his tenure, the number of staff doubled, from around 40 in 2010 to over 80 people by September 2023.

Alumni and artists who have worked at the JamFactory include:

- Margaret Dodd
- Clare Belfrage
- Honor Freeman
- Kirsten Coelho
- Khai Liew
- Peter Andersson
- Bronwyn Kemp
- Christopher Headley
- Lorraine Lee
- Nicola Purcell

== FUSE Glass Prize ==
After the demise of the Ranamok Glass Prize after 20 years in 2014, supporters Jim and Helen Carreker collaborated with JamFactory to create a new award for glass artists. In 2016 the FUSE Glass Prize was established, funded by the Carrekers, along with Diana Laidlaw and other private donors. It continues to be supported by them, along with new private donors.

JamFactory presents the biennial FUSE Glass Prize, a non-acquisitive prize worth A$20,000 open to Australian and New Zealand glass artists. It also awards the David Henshall Emerging Artist Prize, worth A$5,000 in cash and also offering professional development at JamFactory worth around the same. Twelve established artists and six emerging artists are selected as finalists, with their work exhibited at JamFactory, the ANU School of Art & Design Gallery in Canberra, and the Australian Design Centre in Sydney.

Winners of the main FUSE Glass Prize include:

- 2016: Clare Belfrage
- 2018: Jessica Loughlin
- 2020: Cobi Cockburn
- 2022: Matthew Curtis
- 2024: Tom Moore

Winners of the emerging artist prize (named David Henshall Emerging Artist Prize from 2020):

- 2016: Alex Valero
- 2018: Ursula Halpin
- 2020: Madisyn Zabel
- 2022: Bronte Cormican-Jones
- 2024: Emeirely Nucifora-Ryan

== Selected exhibitions and events ==
=== Icon series ===
JamFactory hosts an annual solo exhibition in a series known as Icon exhibitions. These exhibitions celebrate the most influential South Australian artists who work in crafts-based media. These exhibitions include:

- 2013: Stephen Bowers: Beyond Bravura
- 2014: Nick Mount: The Fabric of Work
- 2015: Giles Bettison: Pattern and Perception
- 2016: Gerry Wedd: Kistchen Man
- 2017: Catherine Truman: no surface holds
- 2018: Clare Belfrage: A Measure of Time
- 2019: Angela Valamanesh: About Being Here
- 2020: Tom Moore: Abundant Wonder
- 2021: Kunmanara Carroll: Ngaylu Nyanganyi Ngura Winki (I Can See All Those Places)
- 2022: Jessica Loughlin: Of Light
- 2025: JamFactory ICON 2025 Aunty Ellen Trevorrow: Weaving Through Time

=== Other exhibitions and events ===
- 26 March – 8 May 2011: A Fine Line - Glass Meets Art Exhibition, in collaboration with the Institute for Photonics & Advanced Sensing (IPAS) at the University of Adelaide, displaying the technique and processes behind the making of glass art as well as the glass that underpins new technologies
- April – June 2013, the JamFactory hosted an exhibition featuring the work of its alumni, entitled Designing Craft/Crafting Design: 40 Years of JamFactory.
- 26 April 2015: Special event celebrating food, wine, and design, showcasing the products of 12 Glynde food and wine businesses, in collaboration with the City of Norwood Payneham & St Peters
- October–December 2018: Adelaide Modern, in collaboration with the University of South Australia, a three-part exploration of furniture design, including exhibits by design students at UniSA
- September 2023: GOLD: 50 Years 50 JamFactory Alumni
- December 2024 to March 2025: Gathering Light, exhibiting the work of leading SA artists curated by Brian Parkes: Nick Mount, Liam Fleming, Tim Edwards, Kristel Britcher, Clare Belfrage, and Jessica Murtagh; developed in association with the Chihuly in the Botanic Garden exhibition, highlighting links between Adelaide and the Pilchuck Glass School
