= Higgins Glass =

Higgins Glass refers to any piece of art glass or fused glass fashioned by Michael and Frances Higgins, of Chicago, Illinois, United States, during the last half of the 20th century. Their work combines a Kandinsky-esque visual aesthetic with an emphasis on functionality of the finished pieces.

The glass is especially prized for two reasons: first, its distinctive aesthetic virtue, and second, the uniqueness of the fused glass processes first developed and used by the Higgins.

== Personal history ==
Following World War II Michael Higgins was named Head of Visual Design at the Chicago Institute of Design. Frances Stewart was an assistant professor of Art at the University of Georgia. While working towards her master's degree, Frances studied under Michael at the Institute and their mutual fascination with glass fusing techniques quickly led to a personal as well as professional relationship. They were married in 1948 and immediately set up a studio to cooperatively explore the then-unknown field of modern glass fusing. Because they worked so closely together in the studio, all of their work is simply signed "higgins" which is understood to mean "Michael and Frances Higgins".

== Professional history ==
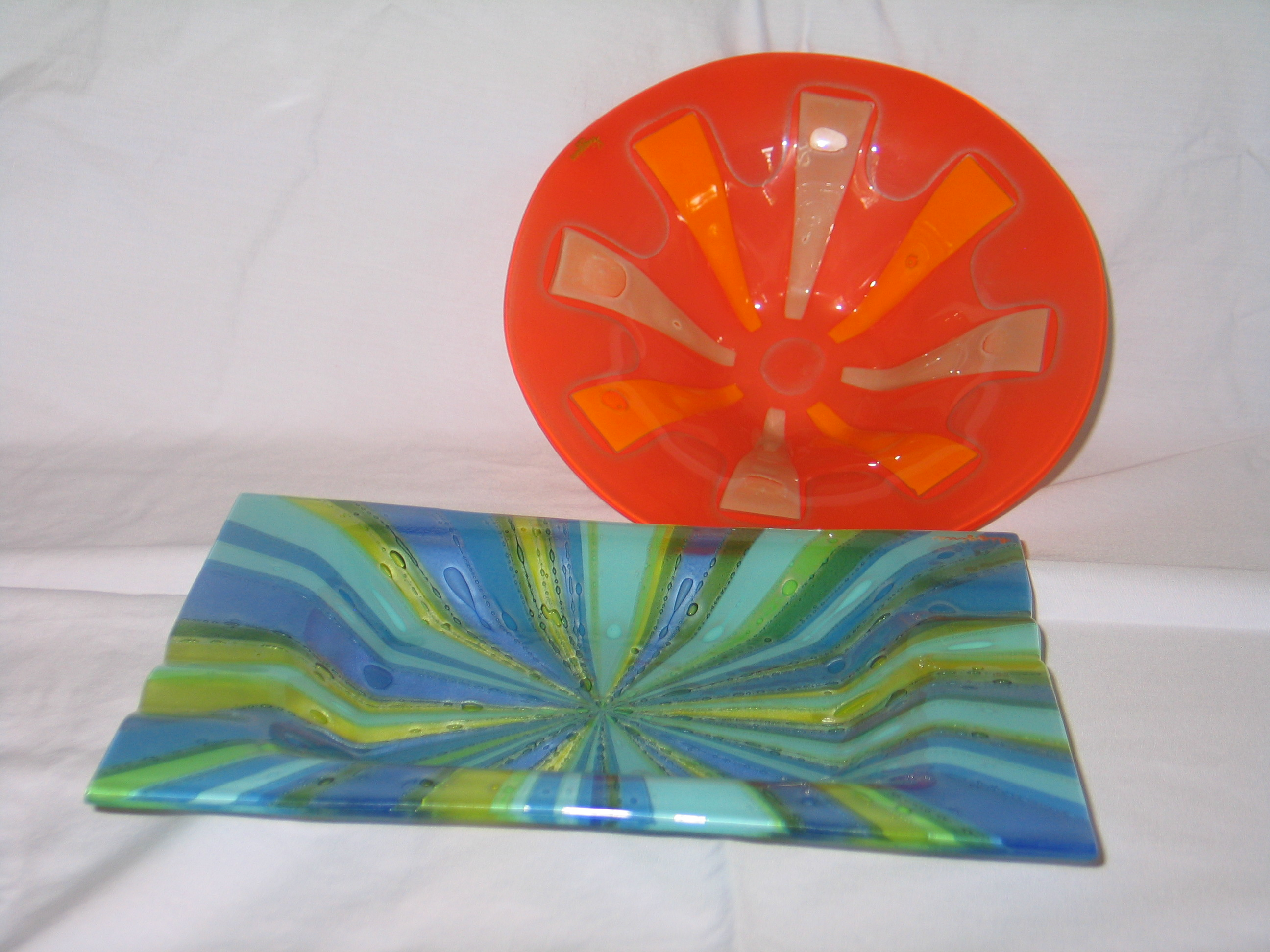
2 pieces of Higgins Glass:Ashtray and Bowl

By 1950 the Higgins' finished products were appearing in upscale retail stores like Marshall Field's, Bloomingdales and others.

In 1951 their work was featured in the Chicago Art Institute's "Designer Craftsman Exhibit" and the "Good Design Show" presented at the Chicago Merchandise Mart.

They quickly became recognized as pioneers in the emerging field of studio glass and their association with the Dearborn Glass Company in the mid-1950s led to a small mass production of Higgins Glass, particularly ashtrays.

Today their work is considered highly collectible and is prized by both museums and private collectors alike.
