= Warm glass =

Method for creating glass art

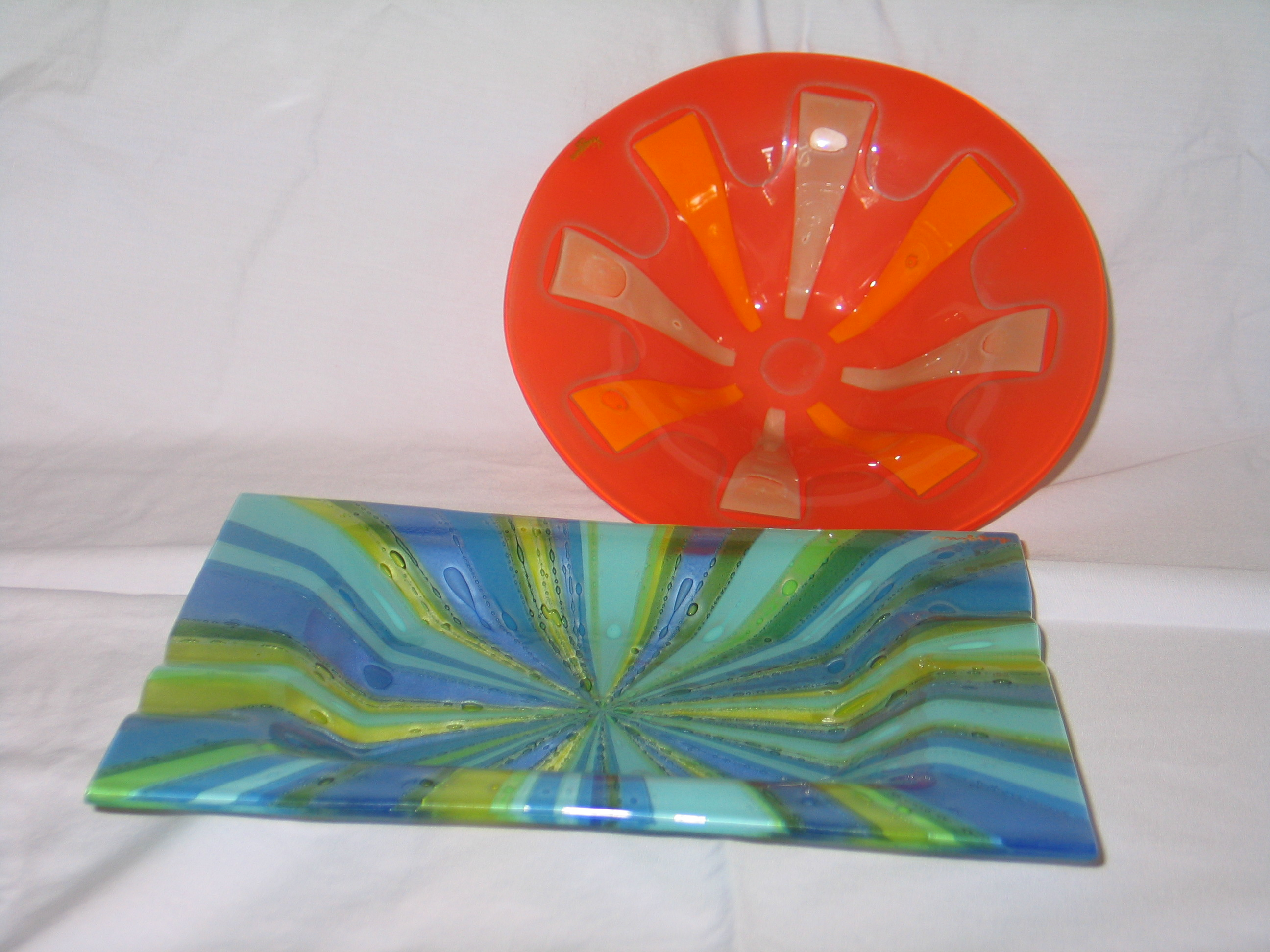
Higgins Glass, fused and slumped ashtray and bowl

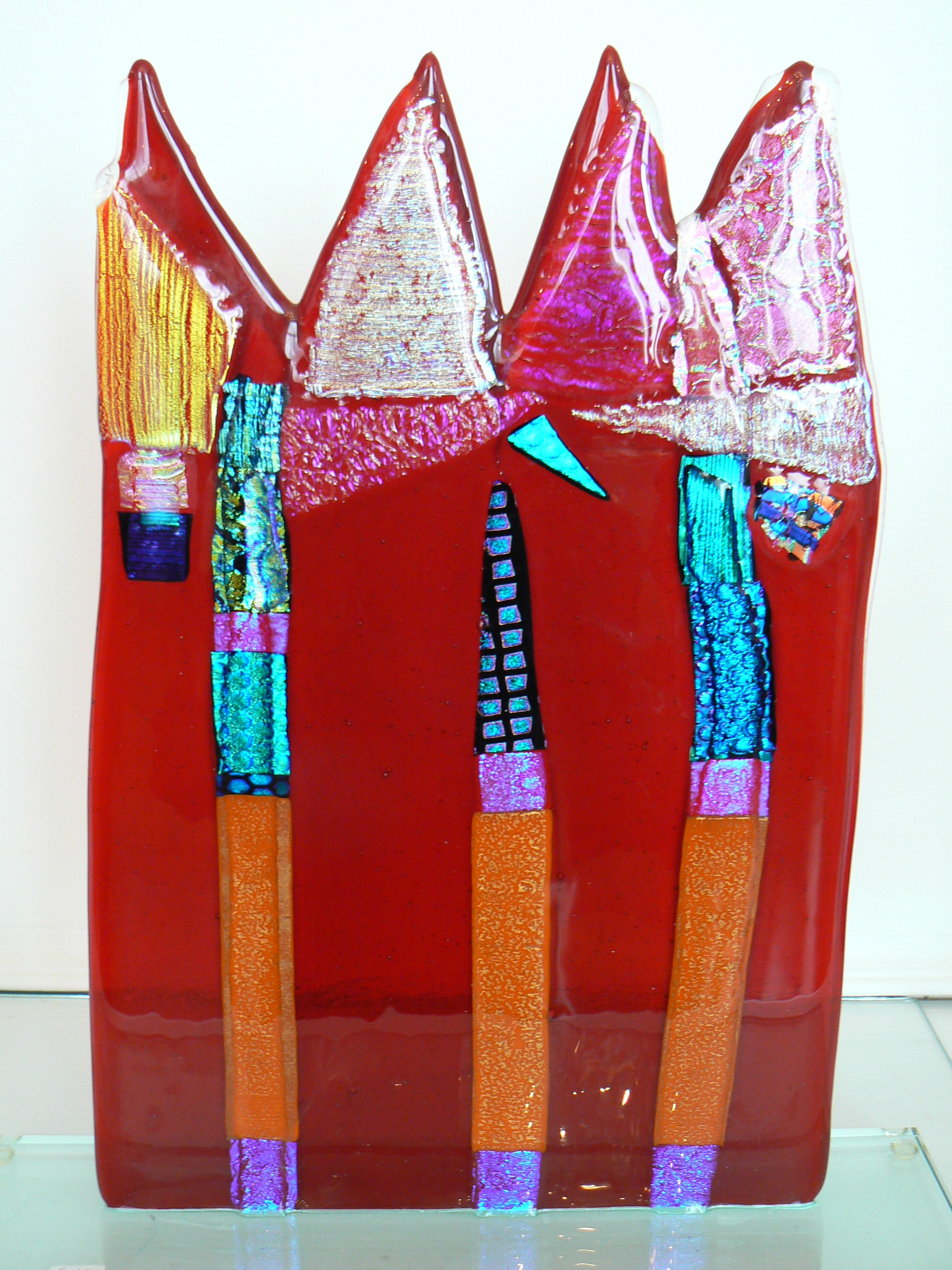
Fused glass piece with dichroic glass highlights

Warm glass or kiln-formed glass is the working of glass, usually for artistic purposes, by heating it in a kiln. The processes used depend on the temperature reached and range from fusing and slumping to casting.

"Warm glass" is in contrast to the many cold-working glass processes, such as leaded glass. "Hot glass", glassblowing, or lampworking is the working of glass in a direct flame, such as for laboratory glassware and beadmaking.

== Processes ==
Warm glass working uses a variety of processes, according to the working temperature and the time the glass spends at this temperature. The glass becomes progressively softer, less rigid, and less viscous with increasing temperature. Kiln-worked glass (unlike lamp working) responds slowly though, and so the amount by which this affects the glass depends on the time it spends at working temperature.

There are three main processes, with variations within them. The broad process depends on the temperature, the variation within it depends on the time and also on slight variations of temperature. These processes are:

- Fusing, in which the glass retains its shape, but becomes sticky and adjacent glass pieces join together
- Slumping, in which the glass deforms in shape, becoming flexible but still retaining its approximate solid form
- Casting, in which the glass melts, becoming a viscous liquid that takes its shape from its containing mould

It is common for a single piece to undergo several of these processes in sequence. For example, coloured glass may be fused to form a composite multi-coloured sheet. This sheet is then cut while cold, re-assembled into new arrangements, and fused again. The finished piece may finally be slumped into a mould to achieve its final form.

Typically, glass is worked for only one process during a single heating cycle. If multiple cycles are required, the piece is cooled to a lower, controlled temperature between each heating stage to prevent thermal shock.

=== Fusing ===
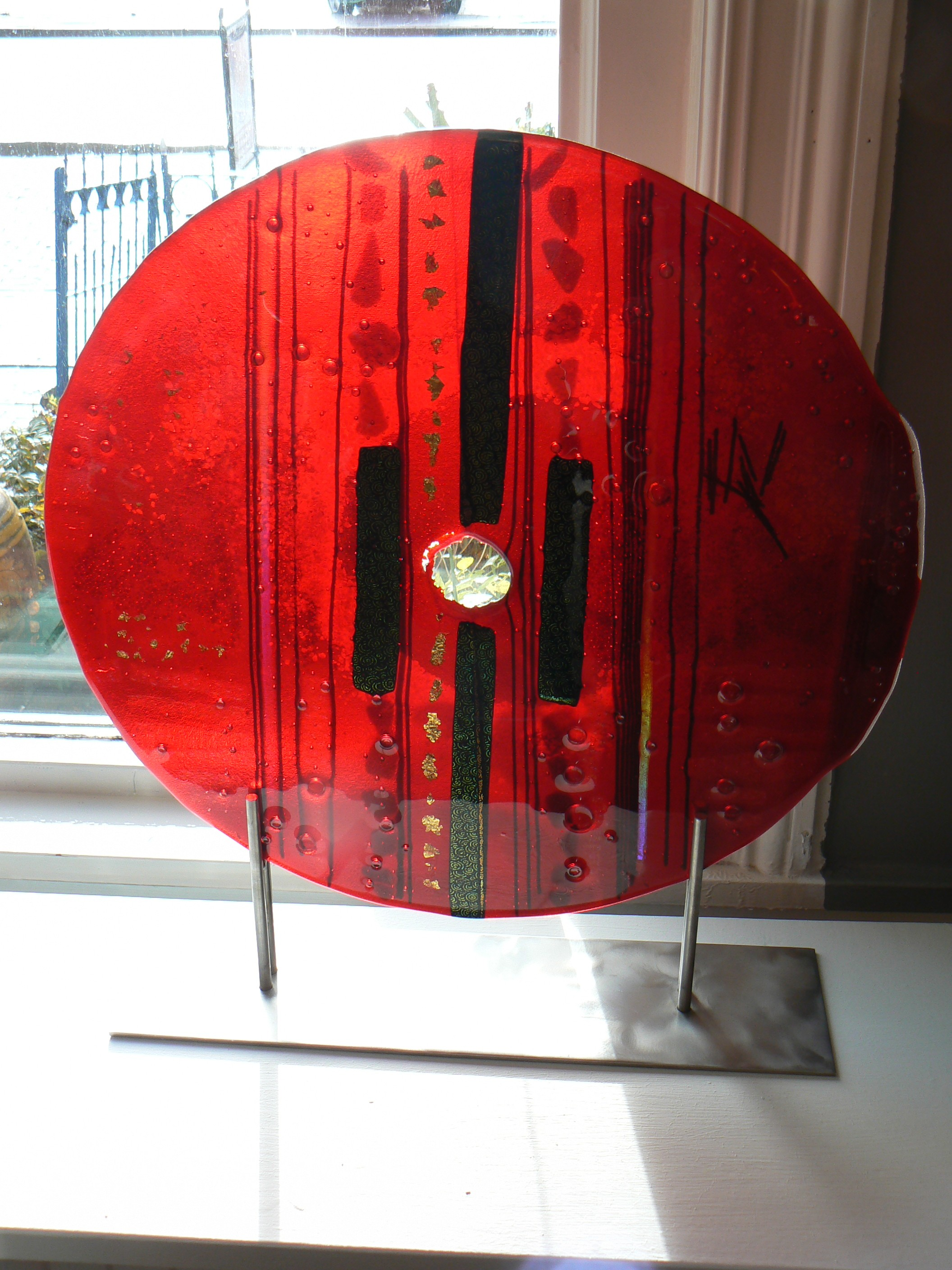
Fused glass platter

Fusing is the use of heat to join the glass by fusion welding, either with or without an associated change in shape, depending on the temperature.

==== Tack fusing ====
Tack fusing is the joining together of glass, with as little change to the shape of the pieces as possible. Tack fusing may be used either decoratively, or to assemble a large piece of glass from laminations.

Where tack fusing is used to apply small decorative details to a larger piece, it is often desired to partially melt the small pieces so that they change shape (usually becoming more spherical, under the influence of surface tension), but without changing the shape of the carrier piece. This can be done by using an increased temperature, but only briefly. The large piece, of large thermal mass, heats up more slowly than the small decorations. For COE 90 and 96 glass tack fusing occurs at 1350–1375°F (732–746°C).

==== Full fusing ====
Full fusing is like tack fusing, but the temperature is higher so that the fused pieces begin to coalesce. In the complete case, decorative additions to a surface are absorbed entirely into it and the surface becomes flat again. It is usually done for decorative effect. For COE 90 and 96 glass fusing occurs at 1450–1490°F (760–787°C).

=== Slumping ===
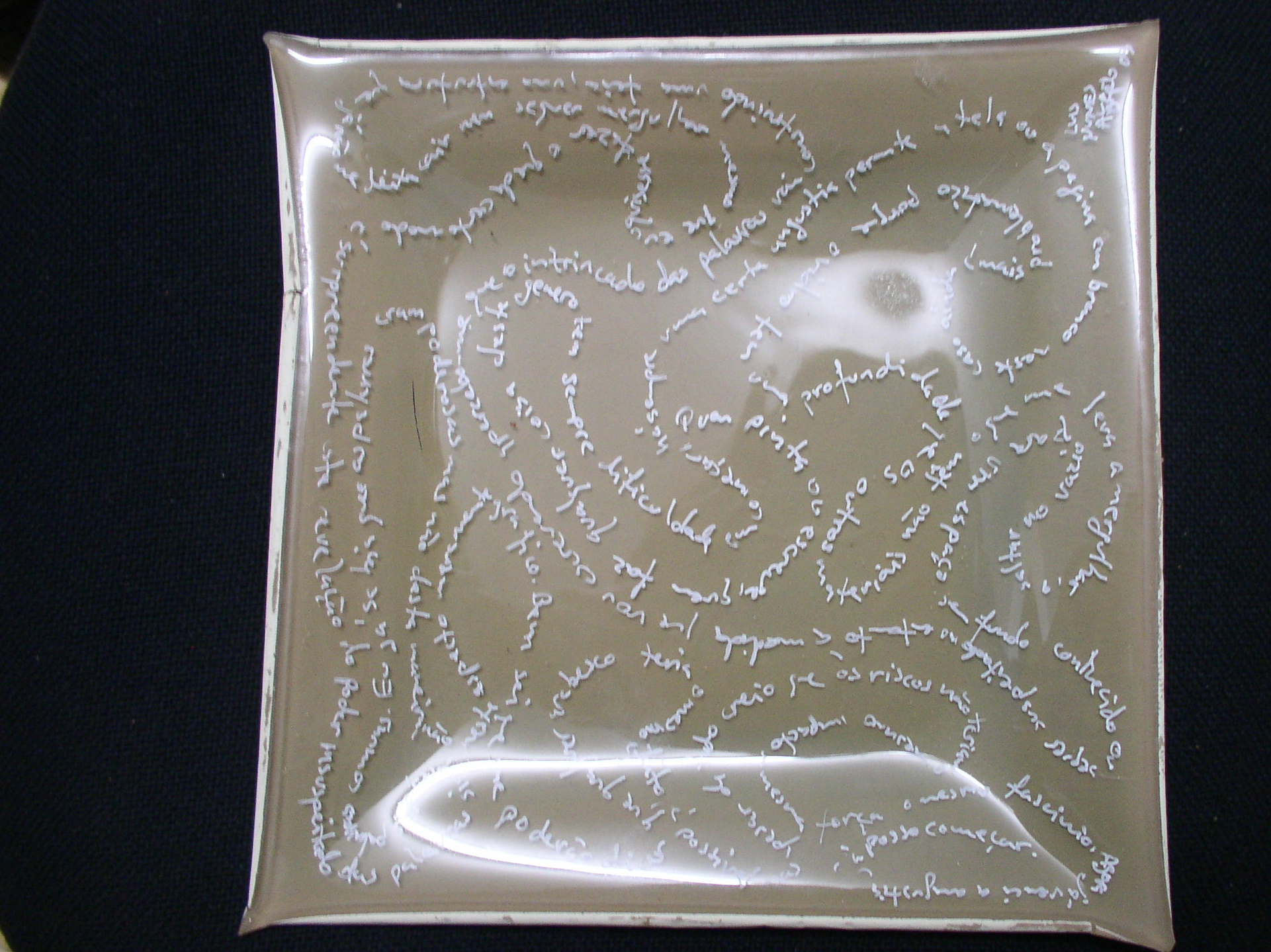
Platter, slumped into a shallow mould

Slumped glass is heated to the temperature at which the glass softens and begins to deform. It may either bend along a single curvature or, if heated sufficiently, may become elastic enough to stretch and curve to follow a compound curvature, such as a bowl. For COE 90 and 96 glass slumping occurs at 1150-1250°F (621–676°C).

==== Mould slumping ====
Mould slumping begins with a sheet of flat glass placed above a ceramic mould. When heated, the glass slumps into the mould under its own weight.

These moulds are usually commercially made and are offered in a range of standard shapes and sizes: bowls, trays etc. For custom pieces, a glass worker may also make a specialised or temporary mould as a one-off.

To avoid trapped air, the mould is perforated with a small vent hole. The hot glass otherwise forms a good seal with the lip of the mould and an air bubble is trapped. Such a trapped bubble often causes problems - when cooling this air may contract to form a partial vacuum that is enough to break the glass. As the glass is not heated enough to become liquid, this air cannot escape as bubbles and so venting is required.

Kiln wash or ZYP Coatings' Boron Nitride Aerosol Lubricoat is used beforehand, to prevent the glass sticking to the mould.

==== Free fall slumping ====
A mould for free-fall slumping is in the form of a ring with a central opening. When heated, the glass falls through this opening and forms a bowl. Depending on the temperature and time, this bowl may be shallow or deep. If a kiln shelf is placed beneath the ring mould, this catches the falling glass and gives a vessel with a flat base.

Free-fall slumping is used to make taller vessels with steeper sides, such as vases.

==== Draping ====
Draping is a variety of free-fall slumping, where the mould former is placed in the centre of the piece and the outer edge falls under the heat. As this outer edge is unconstrained, it tends to fall in large folds. The edge is thus highly uneven, although a carefully draped piece may still retain perfect symmetry. For this reason draped pieces are often used as vases or wavey-edged bowls, but are difficult to use as a more functional vessel.

Draped pieces are sometimes sawn down and smoothed when cold, so as to reduce the unevenness of their edge.

=== Casting ===
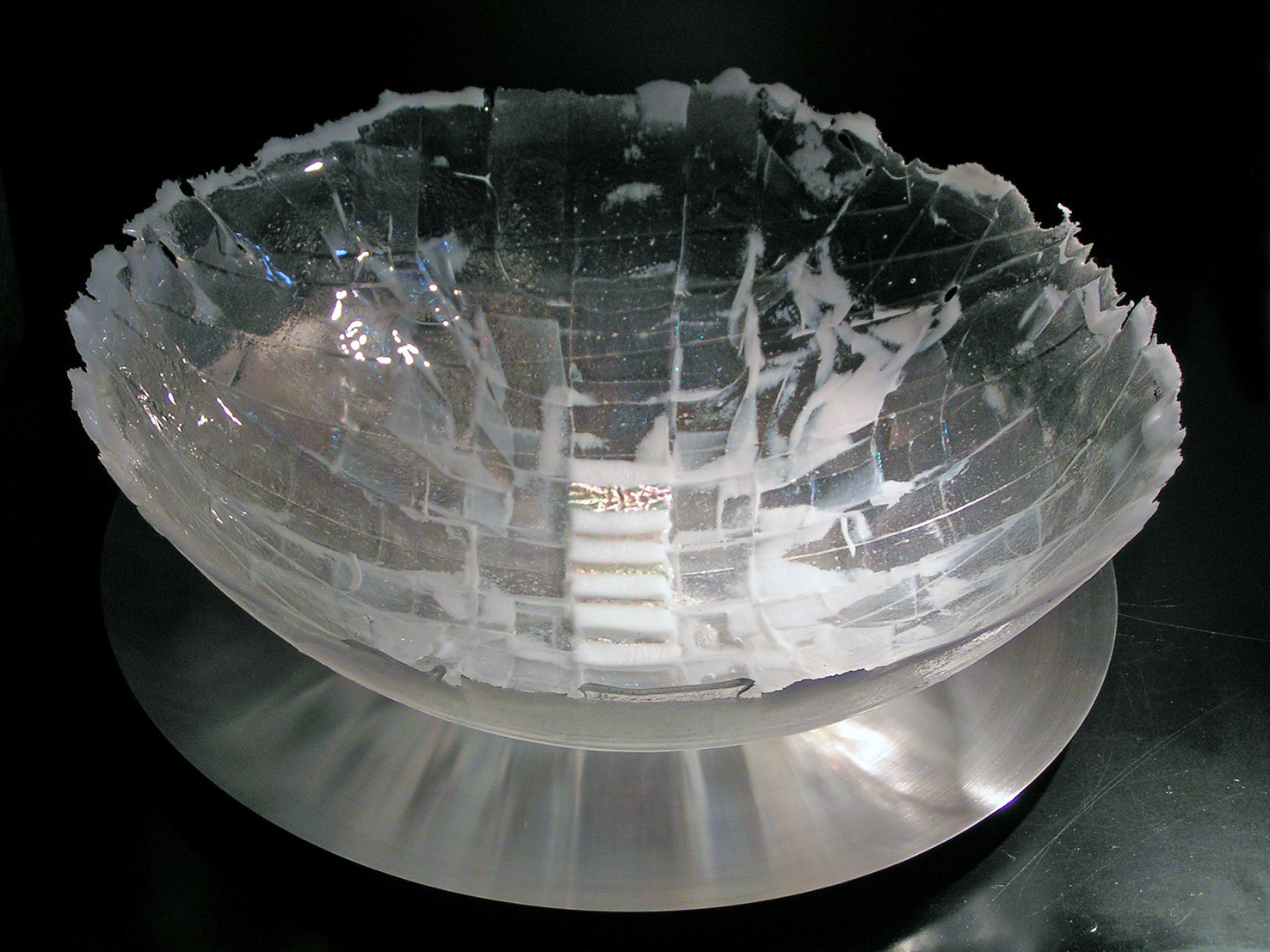
Cast bowl

Casting is the process where the glass begins to melt and behave as a liquid. Its shape is now constrained entirely by the mould and the previous shape is lost. Glass is viscous though and unlike metal casting, the soft glass does not flow through the mould. Variations in the glass are thus preserved in the final piece, so colours and inclusions present beforehand may still remain in the cast item.

Glass may be cast from either billets (solid ingots), sheet, loosely stacked pieces of glass (these are usually used with a low-temperature casting, so that their boundaries remain deliberately visible afterwards) or frit, ground or powdered glass.

Moulds for casting may be either re-usable ceramic moulds, or else a one-use investment mould of plaster. This mould may in turn have been formed by the lost wax process.

==== Pâte de verre ====
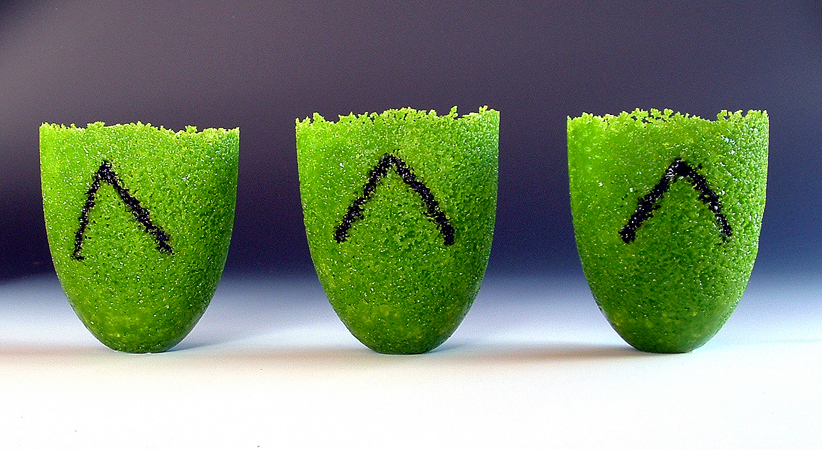
Three pâte de verre vessels

Pâte de verre (literally glass paste) is cast from powdered frit, mixed with a glue binder. This allows the paste to be applied to the sides of a large mould in a thin layer. When fired, a thin-walled vessel is formed. The transparency of the finished casting depends on the size of the frit used: fine powder produces an opaque cast, medium or coarse frit may be used to cast a transparent piece.

=== Other processes ===
==== Fire polishing ====
In fire polishing, the edges are briefly heated in a flame to smooth and round them.

==== Combing ====
This is one of the few processes that involves manual work on the hot glass while still in the kiln. In a similar manner to slip trailing in ceramics, a pattern is formed on the surface, then trailed into feathers with a pointed metal rake.

== Firing ==
Warm glass working is similar to that for ceramics, in that a piece is assembled, placed into a cold kiln and then heated through a pre-defined cycle, including a slow cooling phase afterwards. Unlike hot glass, warm glass is rarely worked manually whilst hot.

=== Kilns ===
Contemporary warm glass work is almost universally done in an electrically-heated kiln, although some gas or oil-fired kilns are still used. The reason for this is the extra control accuracy and programmability available with electric heating, as well as their lower capital cost and convenient installation.

All kilns for glass work require a pyrometer, usually based on a thermocouple, as knowledge of the kiln temperature is essential for controlling the process.

Electric kilns have controllers with a variety of sophistication: the simplest is the "Infinity Control", a simple open-loop power regulator. As this only controls power, rather than temperature, such a kiln must be manually controlled throughout the cycle. As firing cycles extend over several hours, potentially days for large architectural pieces, automatic unattended control is obviously important. Automatic temperature control uses a PID controller that maintains a constant set temperature. More sophisticated controllers allow the ramp heating and cooling rates to be controlled too, an important factor in glass heating. Controllers dedicated for glass kiln use have their entire heating cycles defined before use with multiple set temperatures, hold times and ramps between them. The most sophisticated controllers of all are dedicated to glass use and allow pre-defined cycles such as "Fuse" or "Slump" to be selected from a simple menu, without their operator needing to be aware of the precise temperatures required.

=== Firing cycles ===
Glass' behaviour when heated is highly complex.

== Bibliography ==
- Cummings, Keith (2002). Techniques of Kiln-Formed Glass. A & C Black. ISBN 0-7136-6120-8.
- Beveridge, Philippa; Domeénech, Ignasi; Pascual, Eva (2005). Warm Glass. Lark Books. ISBN 978-1-57990-655-9.
- Cummings, Keith (2009). Contemporary Kiln Formed Glass. A & C Black. ISBN 978-1-4081-0075-2.
- Walker, Brad (2010). Contemporary Fused Glass. ISBN 978-0-9700933-1-8.
