= Ranamok Glass Prize =

Former Australian glass art award

- Awarded for: Excellence in contemporary glass
- Country: Australia and New Zealand
- Presented by: Ranamok Glass Prize Ltd.
- Formerly called: RFC Prize
- First award: 1995
- Final award: 2014

The Ranamok Glass Prize, formerly RFC Glass Prize (or Resource Finance Corporation Glass Prize), was an annual award given to glass artists who live in Australia or New Zealand. The award was established in 1994 by Andy Plummer and Maureen Cahill in order to promote glass art to the public. Plummer and Cahill announced that 2014 would be the final year of the prize.

== History ==
Andy Plummer, a coal industry executive and glass artist, and Maureen Cahill, a gallerist and glass artist, created the Resource Finance Corporation Glass Prize, aka RFC Glass Prize, in 1994 in order to recognise contemporary glass artists in Australia and New Zealand. Plummer, a mining executive, had met Cahill in the early 1990s, when undertaking a glass-making short course at the Sydney College of the Arts. Cahill was an established artist, who had created Australia's first glass course in 1978. Plummer was looking for an arts focus to be the beneficiary of funding by corporations in his sector.

Resource Finance Corporation went through various changes of names and mergers, through Whitehaven Coal, Eureka Corporation and Excel Corporation, and the prize became the Ranamok Prize.

The first exhibition of finalists was held at the Earth Exchange Museum in Sydney in 1995. In August–October 2010, an exhibition of the finalists' work toured to the National Art Glass Gallery in Wagga Wagga, New South Wales. In that year, New Zealand glass artist Lisa Walsh was awarded the prize for her piece titled Across the Lines.

In 2014, Plummer and Cahill announced that they were ending the prize, in part to focus on their own work as glass artists. The final exhibition was held at the Canberra Glassworks, before touring to Sydney and Brisbane.

By this time, Cahill was exhibiting her work regularly, and was running the Glass Artists' Gallery in Glebe, Sydney. One of her works was hung in Parliament House in Canberra. Plummer had retired, and was then aged 64, and was still working on his practice, planning his first exhibition in 2015.

The winning pieces, collected each year by Ranamok Glass Prize Ltd, were donated to the National Gallery of Australia.

After the demise of the Ranamok Prize, a new prize, the biennial FUSE Glass Prize, was established by Jim and Helen Carreker at JamFactory in Adelaide.

== Description ==
The prize was open to artists of any level, and was considered the most prestigious glass award in Australia and New Zealand. An annual showcase of finalists was held, and the winner received a cash prize and the publicity resulting from a major multi-venue exhibition.

The award, which was known for pushing boundaries, attracted entries from glass artists of all levels, including established leading artists. The winner was chosen by a board of directors which included Plummer and Cahill.

It was an acquisitive award, with the winning piece going to the Ranamok (formerly RFC) Collection. (later donated to National Gallery of Australia).

Many of its winners and finalists went on to become well-known artists, with work exhibited around Australia.

== Award winners ==
Year	Artist	Title of winning piece	Country
1995	Deb Cocks	Stream	Australia
1996	Susan Hill	ripening ll	Australia
1997	Jessica Loughlin	Horizon Lines Series #7 & #8	Australia
1998	Ben Edols and Kathy Elliott	Groove II	Australia
1999	Emma Camden	The Tower of Secrets	New Zealand
2000	Richard Whiteley	Blue - Grey	Australia
2001	Mark Thiele	Time 1, 2 & 3	Australia
2002	Mel Douglas	Between the Lines	Australia
2003	David Murray	Gatherer	New Zealand
2004	Scott Chaseling	Censor	Australia
2005	Joanna Bone	Ominous Fruit	Australia
2006	Cobi Cockburn	Shifting Fields	Australia
2007	Evelyn Dunstan	Ngahere Karauna (Forest Crown)	New Zealand
2008	Matthew Ryan	A Net for Light #1	Australia
2009	Lisa Walsh	Across the Lines	New Zealand
2010	Sue Hawker	Too Much Is Never Enough	New Zealand
2011	Masahiro Asaka	Surge 1	Australia
2012	Denise Pepper	Punto in Aria (Stitches in Air)	Australia
2013	Tom Moore	Massive Microscopic Bug	Australia
2014	Kathryn Wightman	Carpet	New Zealand
