= Slumping =

Slumping is a technique in which items are made in a kiln by means of shaping glass over molds at high temperatures. The slumping of a pyrometric cone is often used to measure temperature in a kiln.

== Technique ==
Slumping glass is a highly technical operation that is subject to many variations, both controlled and uncontrolled. When an item is being slumped in a kiln, the mold over which it is being formed (which can be made of either ceramic, sand or metal) must be coated with a release agent that will stop the molten glass from sticking to the mold. Such release agents, a typical one being boron nitride, give off toxic fumes when they are first heated and must be used in a ventilated area.

The glass is cut to the shape of the mold (but slightly larger to allow for shrinkage) and placed on top of it, before the kiln is heated.

The stages of the firing can be varied but typically start to climb at quite a rapid rate until the heat places the glass in an "orange state" i.e., flexible. At that point, gravity will allow the glass to slump into the mold and the temperature is held at a constant for a period that is known as the "soak". Following this stage, the kiln is allowed to cool slowly so that the slumped glass can anneal and be removed from the kiln. If two differing colours of glass are used in a single piece of work, the same CoE (coefficient of thermal expansion) glass must be used, or the finished piece will suffer from fractures as the glass will shrink at differing rates and allow tension to build up to the point of destruction. To compensate for this, many glass manufacturers subscribe to make glass to the same CoE. Examples include Spectrum glass system 96 or uroboros 96 series, and the use of this glass will allow the cooling to remain uniform and ensure that no tension builds up as the work cools.

== History ==
During the Roman period open vessels, such as bowls and plates, could be produced by forming a glass sheet over a core or former. This technique resulted in vessels with rough surfaces, which could then be ground or polished to a smooth finish. An additional technique, used in the production of Roman pillar-moulded bowls, utilised a slotted tool to impress ribs on the glass sheet prior to slumping. This created a bowl with a ribbed exterior, and these were then polished around the rim and sometimes given horizontal cut lines inside for further decoration.

== See also ==
- Glass art
- Warm glass
