= Glass fusing =

Joining together of pieces of glass at high temperature

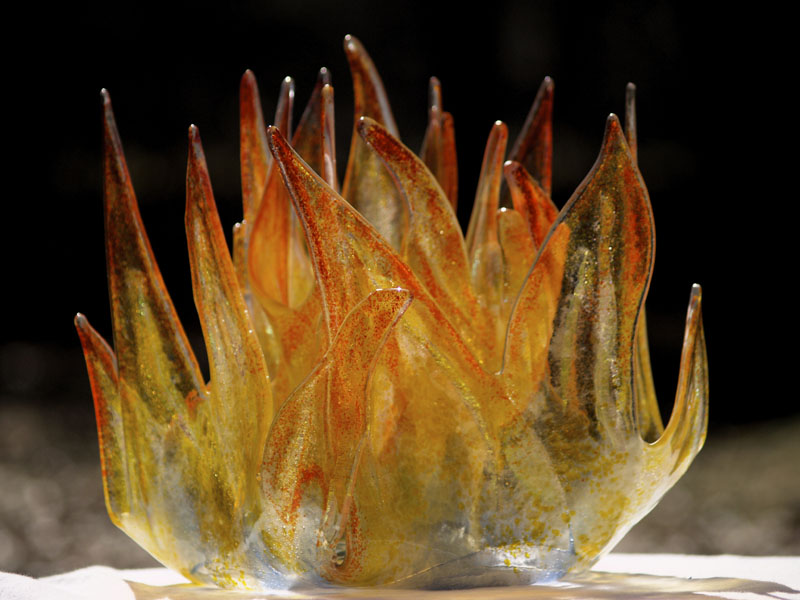
Fused and kiln-formed glass sculpture.

Glass fusing is the joining together of pieces of glass at high temperature, usually in a kiln. This is usually done roughly between 700 °C (1,292 °F) and 820 °C (1,510 °F), and can range from tack fusing at lower temperatures, in which separate pieces of glass stick together but still retain their individual shapes, to full fusing at higher ones, in which separate pieces merge smoothly into one another.

== History ==
While the precise origins of glass fusing techniques are not known with certainty, there is archeological evidence that the Egyptians were familiar with techniques ca. 2000 BCE. Although this date is generally accepted by researchers, some historians argue that the earliest fusing techniques were first developed by the Romans, who were much more prolific glassworkers. Fusing was the primary method of making small glass objects for approximately 2,000 years, until the development of the glass blowpipe. Glassblowing largely supplanted fusing due to its greater efficiency and utility.

While glass working in general enjoyed a revival during the Renaissance, fusing was largely ignored during this period. Fusing began to regain popularity in the early part of the 20th century, particularly in the U.S. during the 1960s. Modern glass fusing is a widespread hobby but the technique is also gaining popularity in the world of fine art.

== Compatibility ==
Disparate pieces of glass must be compatible in order to ensure they can be fused properly. It is a common misconception that glasses having the same coefficient of expansion (COE) will be compatible. Coefficient of expansion is one indicator that glasses may be compatible, but there are many other factors that determine whether glasses are compatible. If incompatible glasses are fused together, it is unlikely that the fused piece will be able to maintain structural integrity. The piece may shatter during the cooling process, or develop stress originating from the point of contact between the incompatible glasses over time, leading to fractures within the glass, and eventually breakage.

Generally, kiln-glass manufacturers will rate their glasses for compatibility with other glasses they make. In order to be certain that the glasses they use will be compatible, many glass fusers will adopt one manufacturer's glasses to use exclusively.

The stress in two pieces of incompatible glass that were fused can be observed by placing the item between two polarizing filters. This will show areas of tension which will develop stress and fracture over time.

== Techniques ==
Most contemporary fusing methods involve stacking, or layering thin sheets of glass, often using different colors to create patterns or simple images. The stack is then placed inside the kiln (which is almost always electric, but can be heated by gas or wood) and then heated through a series of ramps (rapid heating) and soaks (holding the temperature at a specific point) until the separate pieces begin to bond together. The longer the kiln is held at the maximum temperature, the more thoroughly the stack will fuse, eventually softening and rounding the edges of the original shape. Once the desired effect has been achieved at the maximum desired temperature, the kiln temperature will be brought down quickly through the temperature range of 815 °C (1,499 °F) to 573 °C (1,063 °F) to avoid devitrification. The glass is then allowed to cool slowly over a specified time, soaking at specified temperature ranges which are essential to the annealing process. This prevents uneven cooling and breakage and produces a strong finished product.

This cooling takes place normally for a period of 10–12 hours in 3 stages.

The first stage- the rapid cool period is meant to place the glass into the upper end of the annealing range 516 °C (961 °F). The second stage- the anneal soak at 516 °C (961 °F) is meant to equalize the temperature at the core and the surface of the glass at 516 °C (961 °F) relieving the stress between those areas. The last stage, once all areas have had time to reach a consistent temperature, is the final journey to room temperature. The kiln is slowly brought down over the course of 2 hours to 371 °C (700 °F), soaked for 2 hours at 371 °C (700 °F), down again to 260 °C (500 °F) which ends the firing schedule. The glass will remain in the closed kiln until the pyrometer reads room temperature.

Note that these temperatures are not hard and fast rules. Depending on the kiln, the size of the project, the number of layers, the desired finished look, and even the brand of glass, ramp and soak temperatures and times may vary. Small pendants can be fired and cooled very rapidly. For instance, small glass pieces can be fired in as little as one hour.

== Finished products ==
Fused glass techniques are generally used to create art glass, glass tiles, and jewelry, notably beads. Slumping techniques allow the creation of larger, functional pieces like dishes, bowls, plates, and ashtrays. Producing functional pieces generally requires 2 or more separate firings, one to fuse the glass and a second slump to shape it.

Since the 1970s, more hobbyists have focused on using kiln-fused glass to make beads and components for jewelry. This has become especially popular since the introduction of glass manufactured for the specific purpose of fusing in a kiln.

Advancements in kiln technology and compatible glass materials have enabled larger-scale and architectural applications of kiln-formed glass, including fusing followed by thermoforming (reheating and shaping over molds to create textures, curves, or reliefs). Thick fused glass slabs, built up from multiple layers, can be thermoformed to produce textured panels with depths ranging from shallow reliefs to several centimeters. These are employed in interior and architectural elements such as countertops, bar tops, wall cladding, partitions, railings, stair treads, and flooring, where increased thickness provides structural strength and impact resistance.

Such kiln-formed glass components exploit properties like translucency, light diffusion through textures, non-porosity, and chemical durability. In architectural contexts, large fused and thermoformed pieces have been used in installations for facades, decorative screens, and monolithic elements.

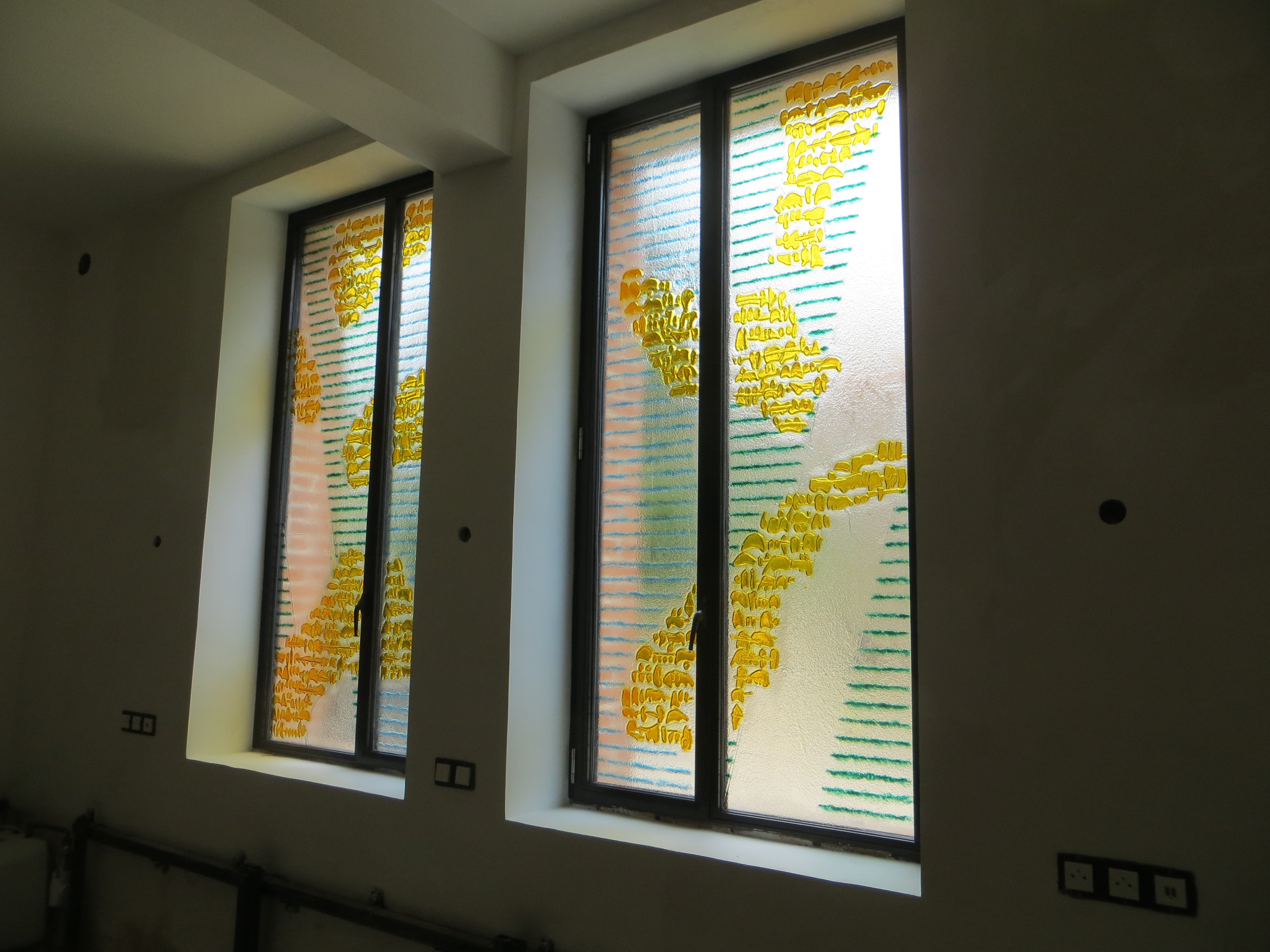
Glass bas-relief - artist : Carlo Roccella

== See also ==
- Fused quartz
- Glass casting
- Slumping
