= Annealing (glass) =

Process for relieving stress in manufactured glass

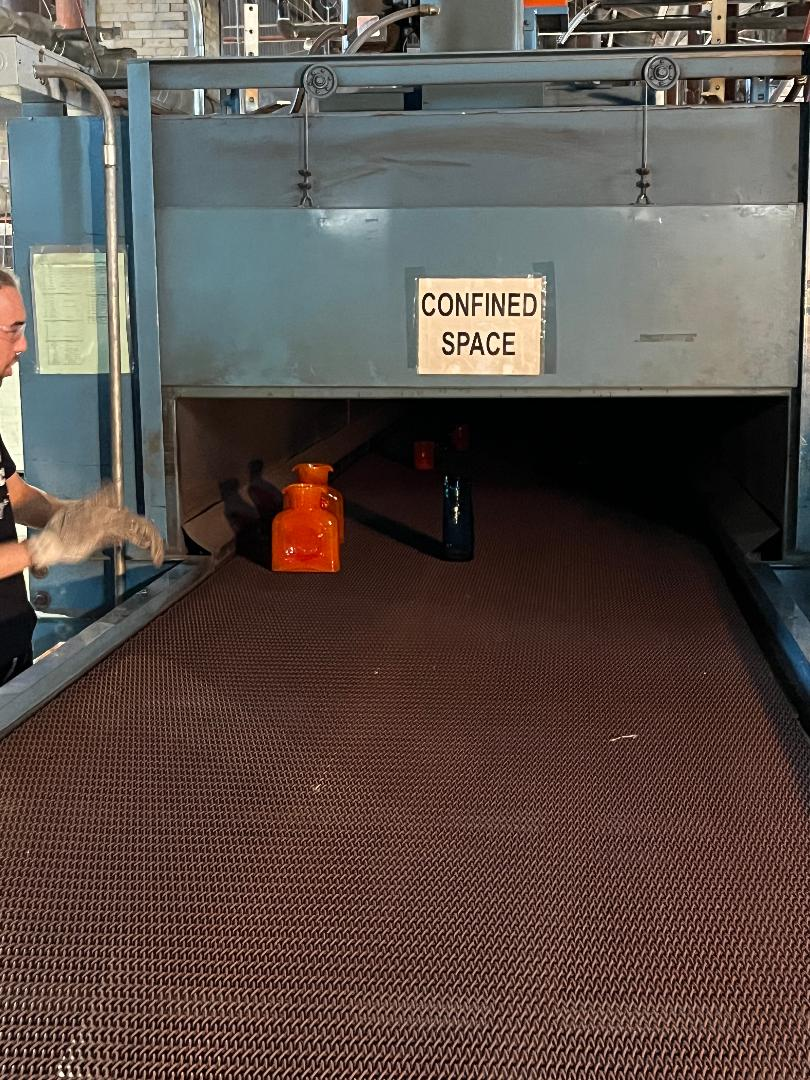
Blenko glassware at cool end of annealing oven (lehr)

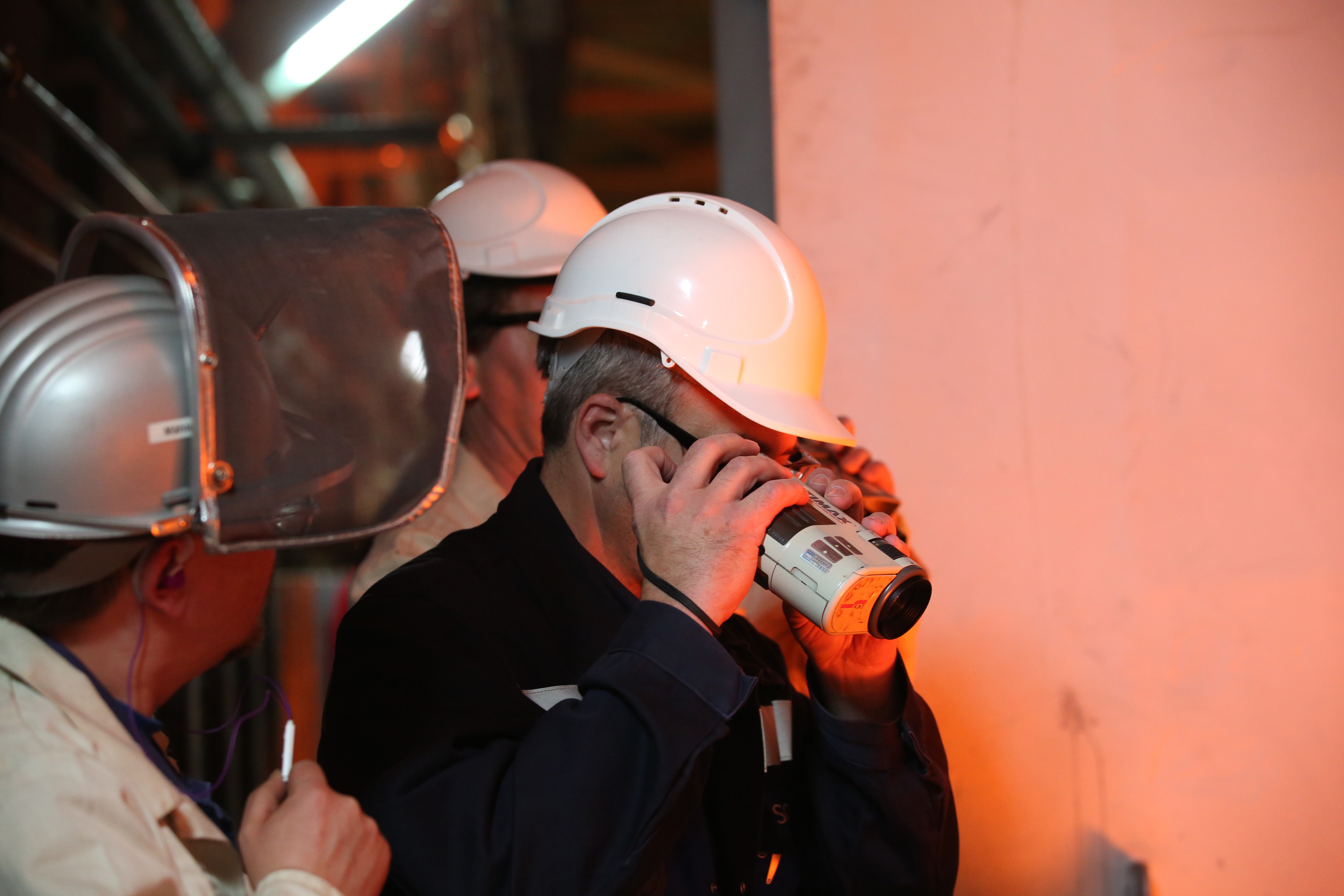
Temperature determination of the ELT secondary mirror blank mould containing the still very hot glass at first annealing; at the Schott 4-metre annealing facility in Mainz, Germany.

Annealing is a process of slowly cooling hot glass objects after they have been formed, to relieve residual internal stresses introduced during manufacturing. Especially for smaller, simpler objects, annealing may be incidental to the manufacturing process, but larger or more complex products commonly require a specialized process of annealing in a temperature-controlled kiln known as a lehr. The annealing of glass is critical to its durability. Glass that has not been properly annealed retains thermal stresses caused by quenching, which decreases the strength and reliability of the product. Inadequately annealed glass is likely to crack or shatter when subjected to relatively small temperature changes or to mechanical shock or stress, or even may fail spontaneously.

To anneal glass, it is necessary to heat it to its annealing temperature, at which its viscosity, η, drops to 10^{13} Poise (10^{13} dyne-second/cm^{2}). For most kinds of glass, this annealing temperature is in the range of 454–482 °C (849–900 °F), and is the so-called stress-relief point or annealing point of the glass. At such a viscosity, the glass is still too hard for significant external deformation without breaking, but it is soft enough to relax internal strains by microscopic flow in response to the intense stresses they introduce internally. The piece then heat-soaks until its temperature is even throughout and the stress relaxation is adequate. The time necessary for this step varies depending on the type of glass and its maximum thickness. The glass then is permitted to cool at a predetermined rate until its temperature passes the strain point (η = 10^{14.5} Poise), below which even microscopic internal flow effectively stops and annealing stops with it. It then is safe to cool the product to room temperature at a rate limited by the heat capacity, thickness, thermal conductivity, and thermal expansion coefficient of the glass. After annealing is complete the material can be cut to size, drilled, or polished without risk of its internal stresses shattering it.

At the annealing point (η = 10^{13} Poise), stresses relax within several minutes, while at the strain point (η = 10^{14.5} Poise) stresses relax within several hours. Stresses acquired at temperatures above the strain point, and not relaxed by annealing, remain in the glass indefinitely and may cause either short-term or much delayed failure. Stresses resulting from cooling too rapidly below the strain point largely are considered temporary, although they may be sufficient to cause short-term failure.

== See also ==
- For other important temperatures in glass processing, see viscous liquid
- Annealing (metallurgy)
- Bologna bottle
- Borosilicate glass
- Fabrication and testing (optical components)
- Float glass
- Tempered glass
- Warm glass
