= Gorgona =

Gorgona may refer to:

- Gorgona Island (Colombia), an island off the Pacific coast
- Gorgona (Italy), the northernmost island in the Tuscan Archipelago
  - Gorgona Agricultural Penal Colony, located on the Italian island
  - Gorgona (wine), Italian white wine made by the prisoners penal colony
- Gorgona Group, a mid-20th century modernist art group
- Gorgona-class transport ship, an Italian Navy class
  - Italian transport ship Gorgona, lead ship of the class
- La Gorgona, a 1913 play by Sem Benelli
  - La Gorgona, a 1914 Italian film based on the play, directed by Mario Caserini
  - The Gorgon (1942 film) (Italian: La Gorgona), an Italian historical drama based on the play
- Gorgona, a half-human, half-fish creature in modern Greek folklore

== See also ==
- Nueva Gorgona, a town and corregimiento in Panamá Oeste Province, Panama
