= Pisa Charterhouse =

Carthusian monastery, or charterhouse, Museum of Natural History

Coordinates: 43°43′19″N 10°31′22″E

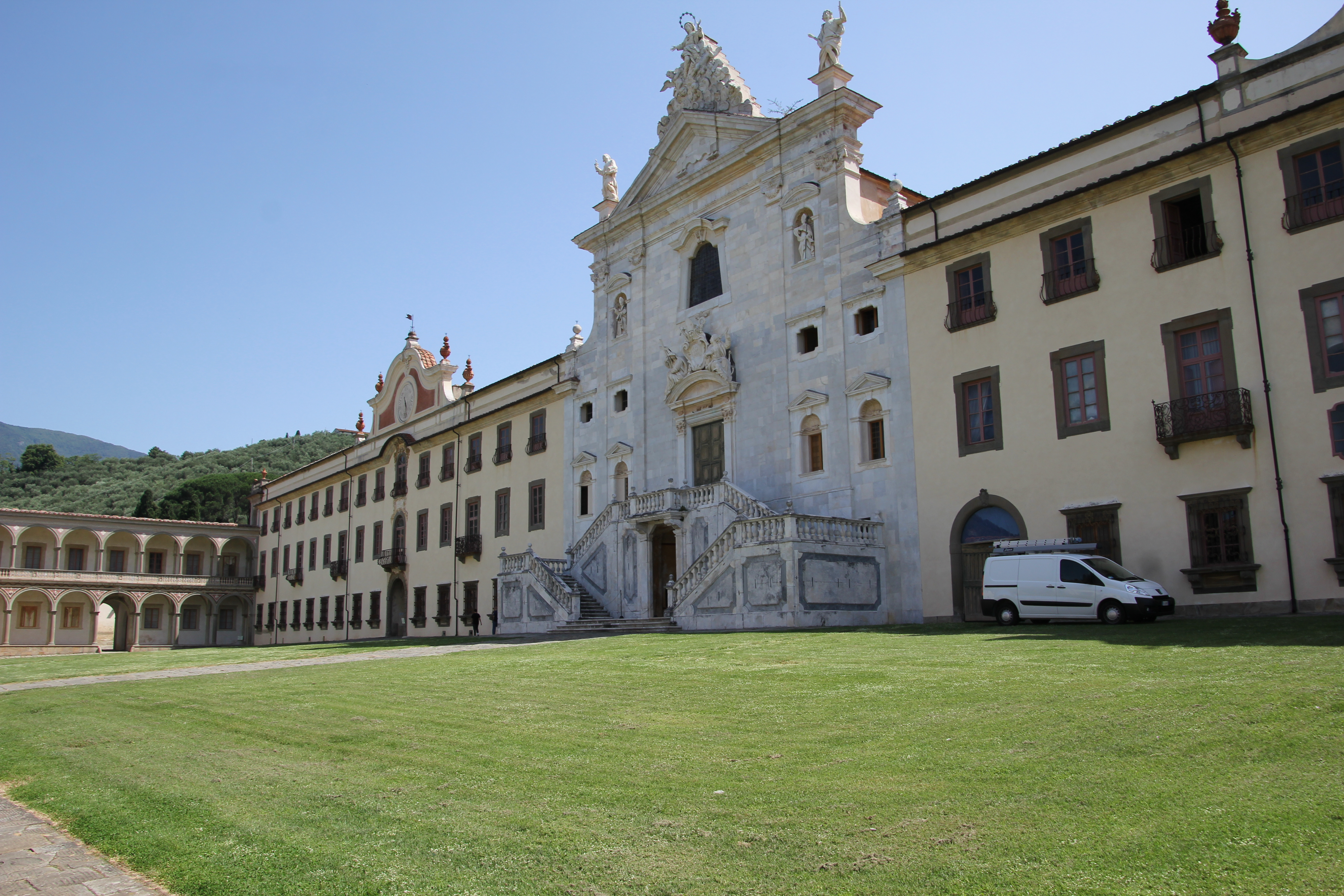
The front courtyard and facade of the church

Pisa Charterhouse, also Calci Charterhouse or Val Graziosa Charterhouse (Italian: Certosa della Val Graziosa di Calci), is a former Carthusian monastery, now the home of the Pisa Museum of Natural History. It is 10 km outside Pisa, Tuscany, Italy, in the comune of Calci.

The monastery is noted for the fresco of the Last Supper, by Bernardino Poccetti (1597).

== Charterhouse ==
The Carthusians founded a monastery in 1366/67 in what is called Val Graziosa, a plain overlooked by the Monti Pisani when Francesco Moricotti Prignani was archbishop of Pisa. Shortly afterwards Pope Gregory XI, a noted reformer of monasteries, expelled the monks from the Benedictine Gorgona Abbey, on the island of Gorgona, and gave the island and the estate to the Carthusians of Val Graziosa, who repopulated them. This event must have happened not long before Catherine of Siena's visit of 1375, as she mentions in her letters the need to convert the facilities for the Carthusian use. Benedictines were barred from the island.

In 1425, the Mediterranean reached a peak of political instability. The peace and safety of the monks on Gorgona could no longer be assured. Fearing a Saracen attack they abandoned the monastery and took up residence at Calci, bringing the records from Gorgona with them, to be duly published at Pisa.

In the 17th and 18th centuries, the complex was renovated, receiving its current Baroque appearance.

After WW2 members of convents from the Netherlands started to repopulate the building that had been heavily damaged during the war years. It was thought that a Dutch Carthusian monastery in Italy could one day lead to the re-establishment of a Carthusian monastery in the Netherlands. However, a lack of funds, lack of novices and internal strife caused the Dutch to abandon their project in the 1960s.

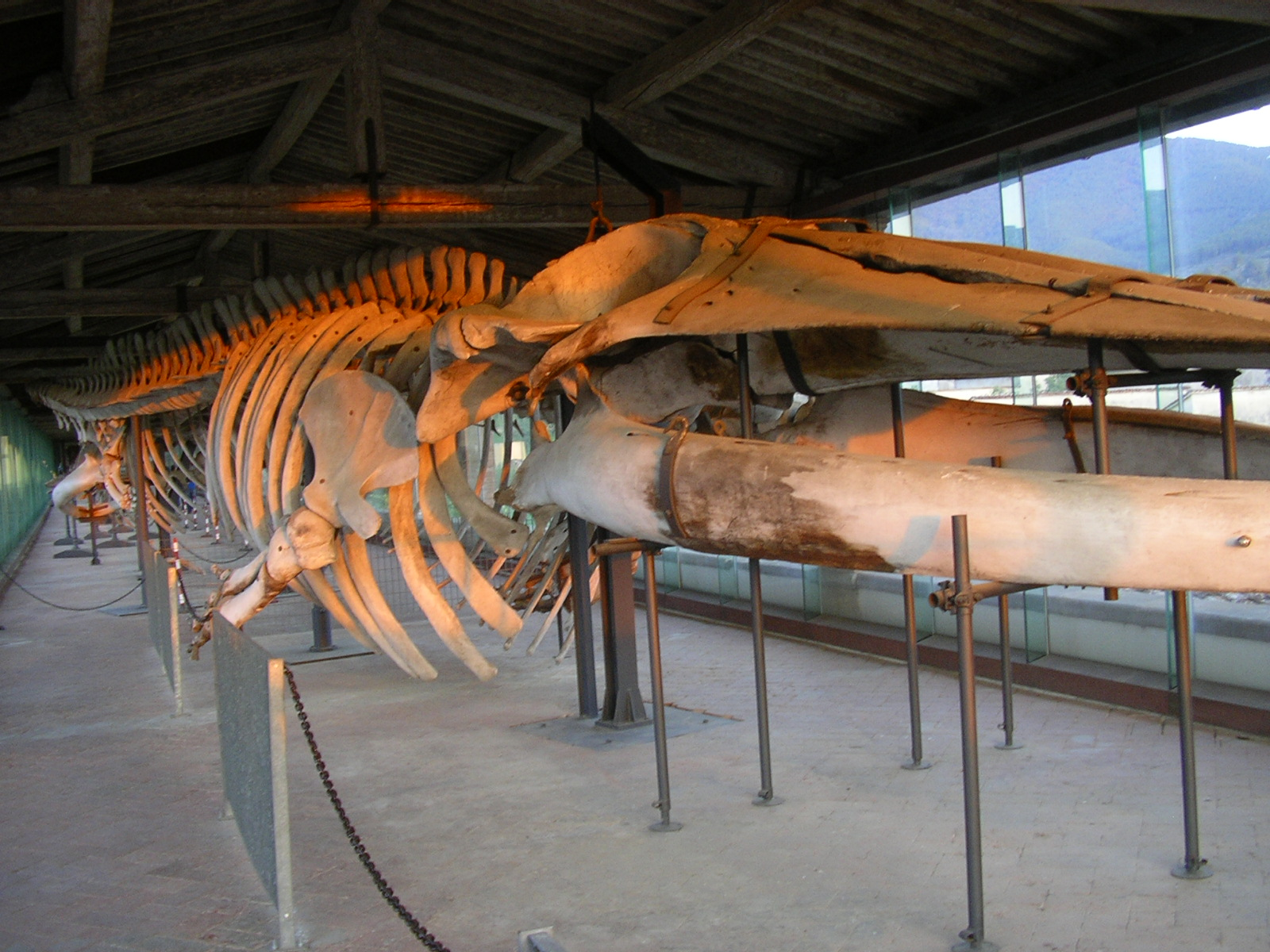
A whale skeleton in the museum

While the most recent monks to have lived in the monastery left in 1972, the monastic living quarters have since been renovated and are also open to the public.

== Museum ==
In 1981, the University of Pisa moved its natural history museum to the Pisa Charterhouse. The collection was started in Pisa in the 16th century as a cabinet of curiosities connected to the Giardino dei Semplici. It houses one of the largest collections of cetaceans skeletons in Europe. The museum also includes a collection of 51 glass marine invertebrates made by Bohemian glass artists Leopold and Rudolf Blaschka.
