= Gorgona (Italy) =

Island in the Tuscan Archipelago

Native name: Isola di Gorgona
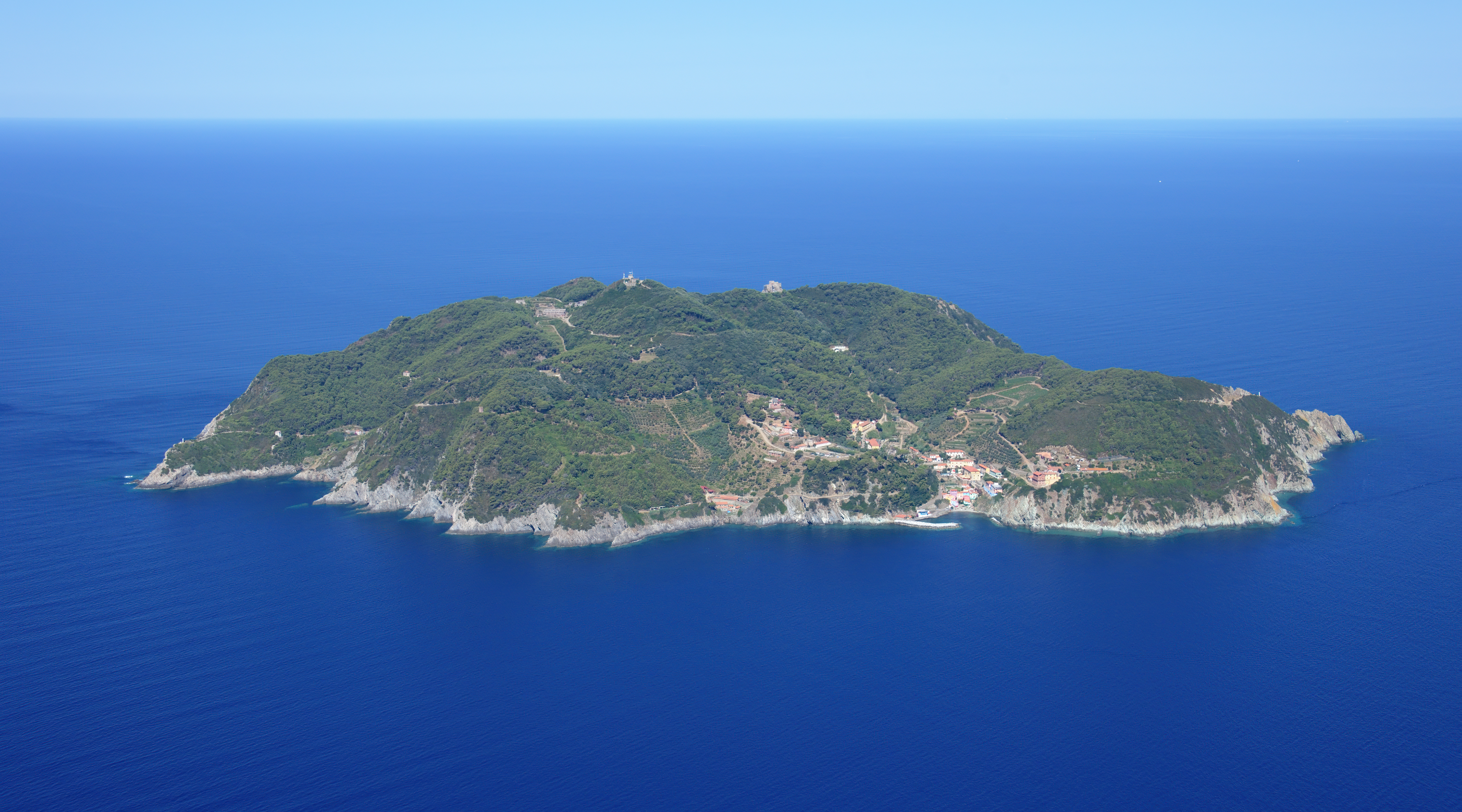
- Aerial view of Gorgona

- Location within Tuscany Location within Italy

Geography
- Location: Ligurian Sea
- Coordinates: 43°25′45″N 9°53′55″E
- Archipelago: Tuscan Archipelago
- Area: 2.23 km^{2} (0.86 sq mi)
- Length: 2.150 km (1.3359 mi)
- Width: 1.650 km (1.0253 mi)
- Coastline: 8 km (5 mi)
- Highest elevation: 254 m (833 ft)
- Highest point: Punta Gorgona

Administration
- Italy
- Region: Tuscany
- Province: Livorno
- Comune: Livorno

Demographics
- Population: 79 prisoners, 47 policemen, a few Officials of the italian Ministry of Justice and some other residents heirs of the old settlers (2012)
- Pop. density: 135/km^{2} (350/sq mi)

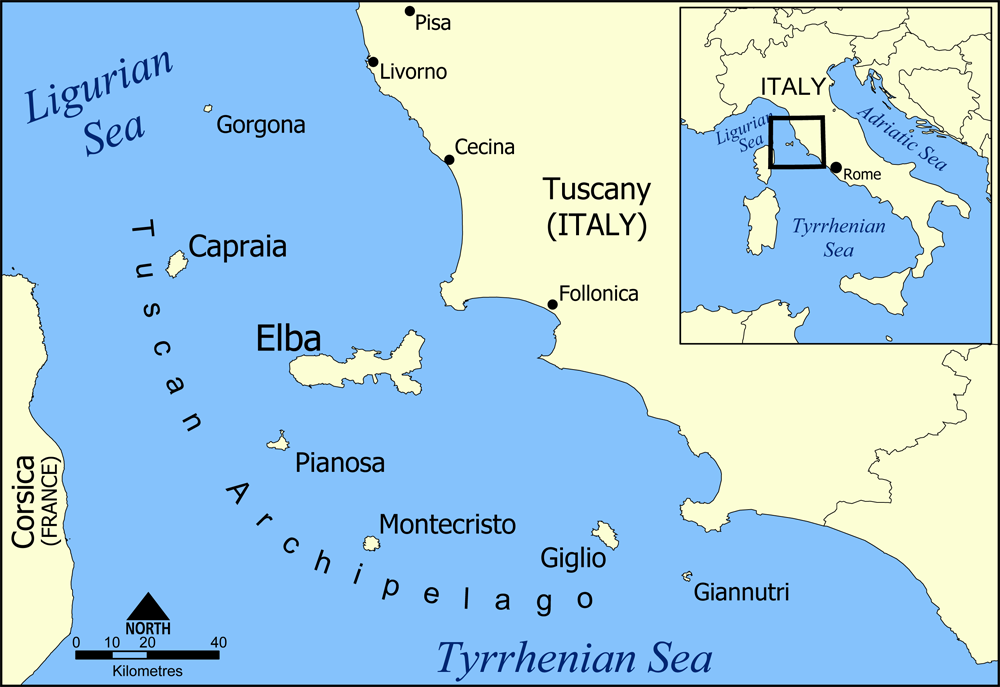
Tuscan Archipelago

Gorgona (Italian pronunciation: [ɡorˈɡoːna]) is the northernmost island in the Tuscan Archipelago, a group of islands off the west coast of Italy. Between Corsica and Livorno, this diminutive island has been valued most for its wildlife, especially marine birds, and its isolation. The latter quality resulted in the foundation of Gorgona Abbey in the Middle Ages. After its closure the monastery grounds and buildings were appropriated in 1869, at the foundation of an agricultural penal colony, which is currently in use.

== Geography ==
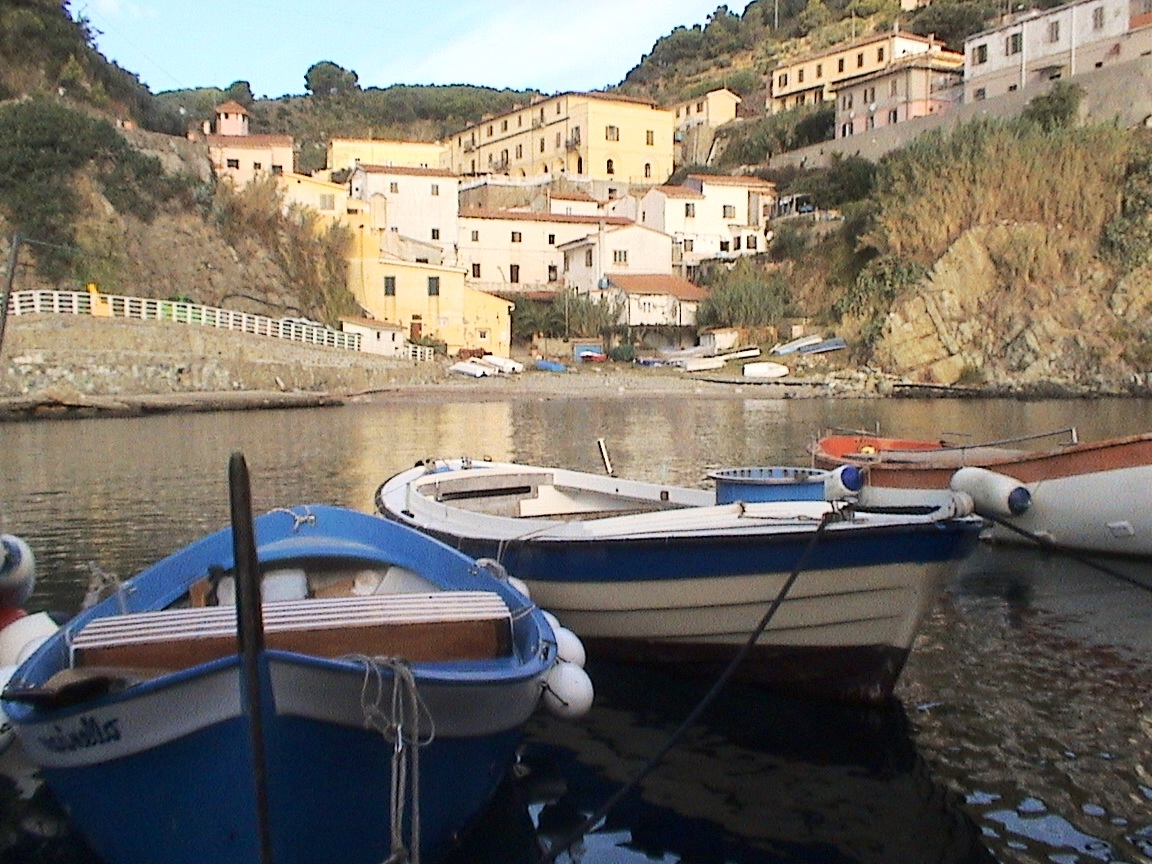
The village seen from the port.

Gorgona is located about 19 nautical miles (about 35 km (22 mi)) straight out from Livorno. It is a ferry ride of about 1.5 hours; however, access to the island is forbidden without permission from the Italian Ministry of Justice. It grants a standing concession exclusively to one group for supervised tours. Photographic equipment is not allowed. Private boats may approach the island no closer than 500 m (1,600 ft) except in emergencies. Capraia is 35 km (22 mi) away; Corsica, 60 km (37 mi).

The only landing place is "Cala dello Scalo", an inlet on the northeast side surrounded by cliffs, the site of the only beach. A fishing village over the beach is now inhabited by workers of the Penal Colony and, above all in the summer, by families of heirs of the old settlers.

On the cliff overlooking the bay is a historic site, the Torre Nuova, "new tower", built as a watchtower by the Grand Duchy of Tuscany in the 17th century.

From the beach an unpaved road leads up to the settlement at the head of a pass between the two prominent heights: Punta Gorgona at 254 m (833 ft) to the south and Punta Zirri at 213 m (699 ft) to the north. On the cliffs at the west side of the island on the other side of the pass is the Torre Vecchia, "old tower", built as a watchtower by the Republic of Pisa in the 12th century.

Occupation of the island has been primarily on the steep slopes and terraces of the east coast. A number of monastery and other buildings were constructed there. The prison, which has been structured as a working farm, has taken over or takes responsibility for maintaining this entire region. Prisoners work in agriculture or raise animals or learn whatever building trades are useful to the enterprise. Their living space is rather big with good rooms as cells, some spaces for group activities and a pleasant soccer 5 field. Most of the prisoners work outdoors, in the village area too. So interaction with residents and outsiders is controlled.

== History ==
=== Ancient history ===
Urgon or Gorgòn (Γοργόν in Ancient Greek), believed to be Gorgona, receives brief mention in Pliny, who only states that it is near Pianosa and Capraia. Pomponius Mela had mentioned the name earlier (43 BC) but only as an item in a list of the islands in the vicinity.

=== Monastic history ===
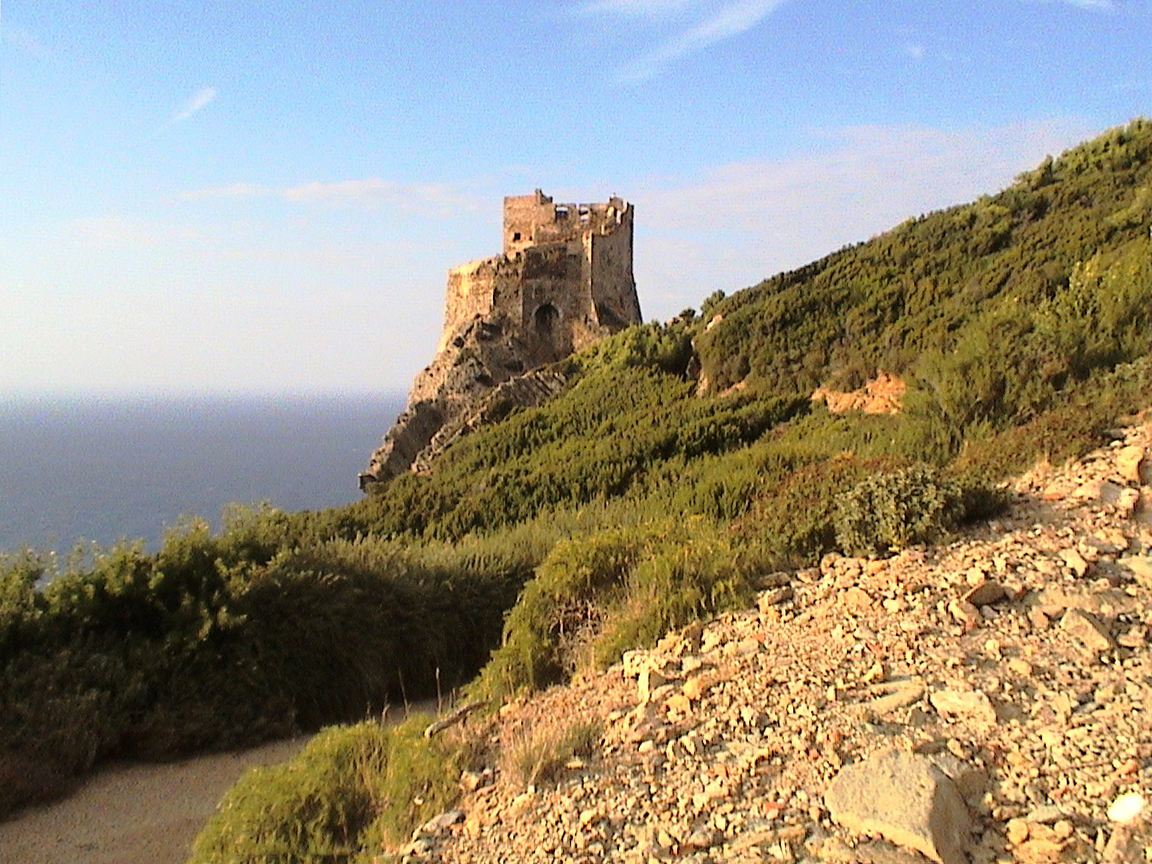
The old tower on the west coast.

Rutilius Claudius Namatianus in describing his voyage of 417 AD in the region says that "Gorgon" rises up in the middle of the sea between the Pisan and Cyrniacan (Corsican) shores. He had already stated that there were monachi, "monks", on Capraia and now relates the story of an aristocratic youth who had given up wealth, status and the opportunity for marriage to retire to Gorgon in "superstitious exile", implying that monasteries of sorts were already on the two islands.

Tradition holds that monks from Gorgona rescued the relics of Saint Julia of Corsica before they were carried to the mainland in the 8th century. Finally, in 1425, the Saint Julia relics were carried to Calci Chartreuse, near to Pisa.

The monastery was abandoned after its destruction by the Saracens. In the 11th century the Republic of Pisa cleared the Tyrrhenian Sea of Muslims and proceeded against their strongholds in Africa. In 1051, just prior to the Pisan occupation of Corsica, the monastery was reconstituted, still Benedictine, and was declared under papal protection. Subsequently, gifts of land were made by aristocrats in Tuscany (where Pisa is located) and northern Corsica. The monastery began to keep land records from Corsica, the first known from there.

Letter 130 of Catherine of Siena, a Dominican nun, to Ippolito degli Ubaldini of Florence encourages him to enter and contribute to the monastery of Gorgona. The letter in stating that the monastery needed to be refurbished to conform to the "rule of the Carthusian Order" implies that it was recently converted to that order. It must have been written after her vision of 1375 and visit to the island then.

Two inscriptions at Pisa Charterhouse at Calci attribute the change of order to the influence of Catherine on Pope Gregory XI in trying to obtain economic assistance for the Carthusians. The pope made a grant of money and gave the Carthusians Gorgona. The change cast reproach on the Benedictines for their alleged non-monastic way of life. They were asked to leave the island and were banned from it.

Carthusians from Pisa Charterhouse retenanted the monastery under Don Bartholomew Serafini. He promptly invited Catherine to visit. She lodged outside the monastery but was invited to address the monks. She spoke on resisting the temptations of Satan. The mantle she was asked to leave as a token of the visit placed later in the hands of a young monk tempted to suicide by the death or illness of his mother is said to have removed all temptation, a token, in the church, of her sainthood.

Subsequently, the Mediterranean became politically unstable. Fearing an attack by Saracen corsairs the monks left the island for the charterhouse at Calci in 1425, taking all the records and works of art with them, and never returned. The records were duly published at Pisa. The island however remained in the ownership of Pisa Charterhouse until the 18th century.

=== Modern history ===
Early in 1771 Peter Leopold I, Grand Duke of Tuscany, purchased Gorgona from the Carthusians of Pisa with the intent of making it part of a plan for economic revival. In March of that year he passed a law opening the island to settlement by fishermen with the proviso that they would catch and cure anchovies and sell them in Livorno. The fishing village dates to this time. This opportunity to live in Gorgona was raised from the families named "Citti" and "Dodoli", coming from Garfagnana region in province of Lucca. These two families worked hard to make Gorgona a good place to live in, being able to stay there until the present day.

With the unification of Italy in 1861, including the former Grand Duchy of Tuscany, ownership of Gorgona passed to the new Kingdom of Italy. Gorgona became a new and experimental agricultural penal colony in 1869.

== Literature ==
Island of Gorgona, with Capraia too, is part of one of the best-known verses of Dante Alighieri's poem La Divina Commedia:

Ahi Pisa, vituperio de le genti
del bel paese là dove 'l sì suona,
poi che i vicini a te punir son lenti,
muovasi la Capraia e la Gorgona,
e faccian siepe ad Arno in su la foce,
sì ch'elli annieghi in te ogne persona!,
Ché se 'l conte Ugolino aveva voce,
d'aver tradita te de le castella,
non dovei tu i figliuoi porre a tal croce

== Ecology ==
The ecology of Gorgona is under the protection of the Tuscan Archipelago National Park, dating from 1996, with headquarters at Portoferraio, Elba. Most of the island is in its native state, 90% of it being forested with maquis, 2 m (6.6 ft) to 5 m (16 ft) high.

Among its plant species are Arbutus unedo, Rhamnus (Buckthorn), Pistacia lentiscus, Juniperus phoenicea, Myrtus communis, Erica arborea, Erica scoparia, Rosmarinus officinalis, Phillyrea angustifolia, and Phillyrea latifolia. The flowers in more open country include Lavandula stoechas, Helichrysum italicum, Cistus incanus, Cistus salvifolius, and Cistus monspeliensis. Calycotome spinosa and Spartium junceum appear on the slopes. Linaria capraria is endemic to the archipelago and to Gorgona too. Evergreens predominate. There are groves of holm-oak, the remnant of a prehistoric forest, and pine woods of Pinus halepensis, Pinus pinea, and Pinus pinaster.

Gorgona is one of only five islands on which the Corsican finch is found.

== Economy ==
In the nineteenth century the island was famous for its anchovies. Reservation by the Italian government reduced all economy to that of the prison until last year. In 2012 the Department of Justice approved and gave finances to a plan called "Progetto Granducato" (Granducato Project), to reach the goal of giving prisoners professional training and real job opportunities, inviting private investors to start enterprises in Gorgona. The first company getting a business agreement with the prison's management, was the world-famous wine producer "Marchesi de' Frescobaldi". So nowadays the oldest and more prestigious wine brand of Tuscany, is giving prisoners of Gorgona the chance to get an exceptional know-how grown in the centuries, to make their own wines Vermentino and Ansonica, extra virgin olive oil and any other farm goods.

== See also ==
- List of islands of Italy
- Punta Cala Scirocco Lighthouse
- Punta Paratella Lighthouse
- Arcipelago Toscano National Park
