= Carlo Passerini =

Italian entomologist

Carlo Passerini (29 November 1793 Florence – 4 March 1857 Florence) was an Italian entomologist. He was Curator at the R. Natural History Museum in Florence. His collection of Coleoptera is in the Paolo Savi Museum in Pisa (now the Natural History Museum of the University of Pisa).
