= Sebastiano Richiardi =

Italian anatomist and zoologist

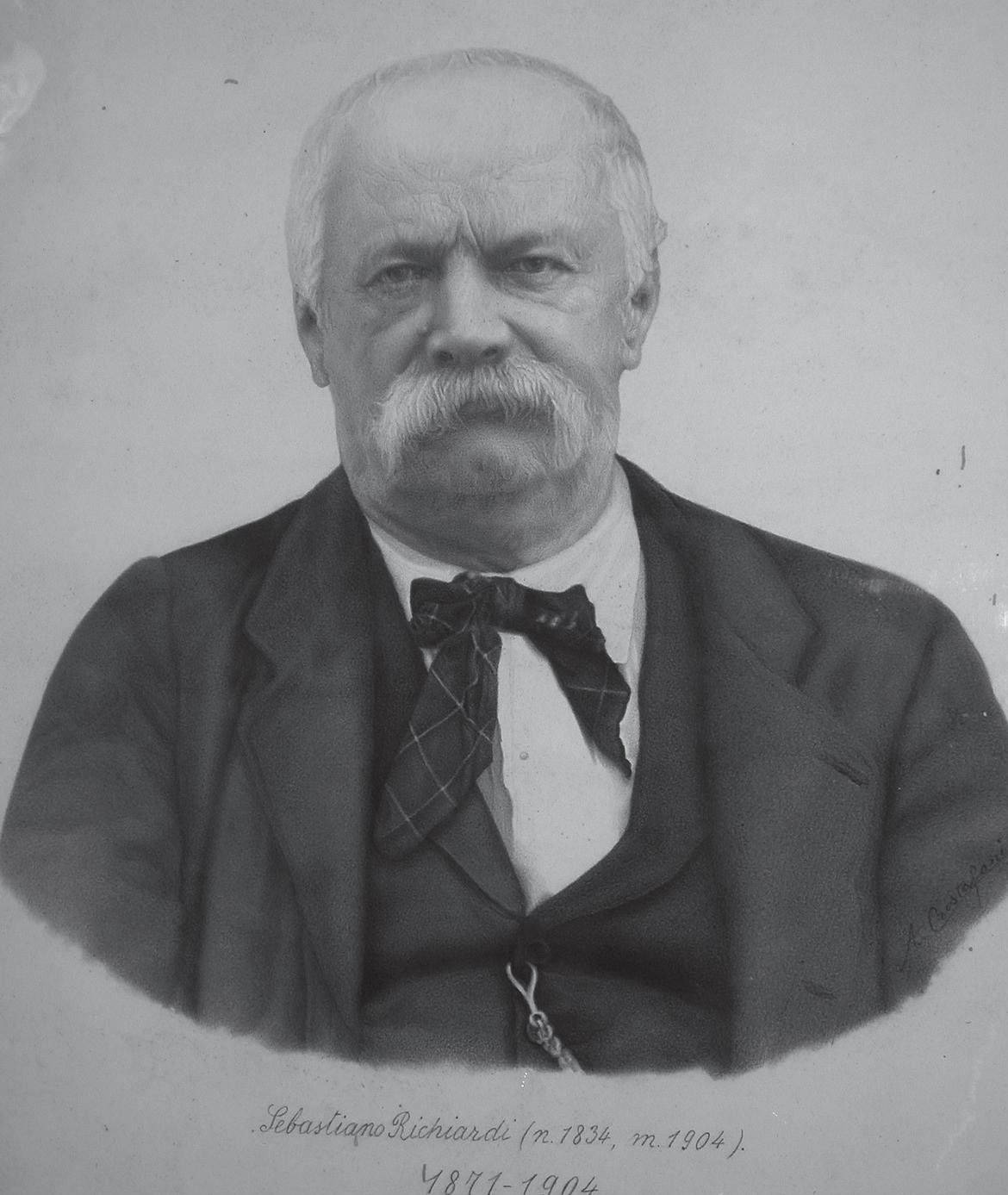
Sebastiano Richiardi

Sebastiano Richiardi (26 February 1834, Lanzo – 1 August 1904, Marina di Pisa) was an Italian anatomist and zoologist. He studied Anatomy in Pisa and completed his degree in Natural History at Turin.

In 1861 he became Professor of Comparative Anatomy at the University of Bologna and in 1871, held the same post at the University of Pisa. He was Rector Magnificus (principal) of the University of Pisa between 1891 and 1893.

== Publications ==
Publications include;

- Monografia della famiglia dei Pennatulari ('Monograph on the family of the Pennatularians')
- Catalogo sistematico dei Crostacei che vivono sul corpo degli animali acquatici d’Italia ('Systematic catalogue of the crustaceans that live on the bodies of the aquatic animals of Italy') (1880)

== Collections ==
The Richiardi collection of vertebrate osteology (together with his mounted specimens) and invertebrates is in Museo storia naturale di Pisa; Richiardi was director of the Museum from 1871 until his death.
