= Gorgona Abbey =

Monastery in Gorgona, Italy

Gorgona Abbey, later Gorgona Charterhouse (Certosa di Gorgona), was a monastery on the small island of Gorgona in the Mediterranean between Corsica and the coast of Tuscany. It was abandoned in 1425. The remnants of the Abbey's ground are now part of the Gorgona Agricultural Penal Colony.

== Benedictines ==
The existence of a monastic community on the island is evidenced from the 4th century. By the 6th century there was a Benedictine abbey here, which was later abandoned due to the dangers from Saracen pirates.

The abbey was re-founded in 1051, when the Mediterranean was more secure, and received endowments from the nobility of Pisa and the rest of Tuscany, and of Corsica.

== Carthusians ==
By the 14th century the monastery had entered a decline, and in 1373 was granted to the Carthusians of Pisa Charterhouse by Pope Gregory XI, under the influence of Saint Catherine of Siena. The Benedictines were banned from the island. Unusually, the prior of the new charterhouse inherited from his Benedictine predecessors the title of abbot, and the charterhouse that of abbey.

Saint Catherine visited the new Carthusian community shortly after their settlement here, and notes that work was still in hand to convert the premises for the use of the Carthusians.

The monastery was however, like the first one here, under constant threat from North African pirates, and was attacked several times, in 1382, 1384, 1420 and 1423. The last attack was so severe that in 1425 the monks abandoned the island for good and returned to Pisa Charterhouse, taking their records and works of art with them. Gorgona Charterhouse was merged back into that of Pisa, who retained possession of the land on the island.

Ongoing disputes over land with the inhabitants of the island led the Carthusians of Pisa to sell their interests here in 1776 to the Grand Duke of Tuscany, who set up a fishing village here.

== Sources ==
- Leoncini, Giovanni, 1989: Le certose della provincia Tusciae, Analecta cartusiana, No. 60.1. Salzburg: Institut für Anglistik und Amerikanistik, 1989.
- Leoncini, Giovanni, 1994: Les difficultés des chartreuses de Toscane, Analecta cartusiana, New Series No 11–12. Pont-Saint-Esprit: Centre de recherches cartusiennes
