= Punta Cala Scirocco Lighthouse =

Punta Cala Scirocco
- Location: Gorgona; Tuscany; Italy
- Coordinates: 43°25′14″N 9°54′03″E

Tower
- Foundation: concrete base
- Construction: fibreglass
- Height: 5 metres (16 ft)
- Shape: cylindrical tower with small balcony and light
- Markings: white tower
- Power source: solar power
- Operator: Marina Militare

Light
- Focal height: 45 metres (148 ft)
- Intensity: LABI 40 W
- Range: 9 nautical miles (17 km; 10 mi)
- Characteristic: Fl (2) W 10s.
- Italy no.: 1992 E.F

Punta Cala Scirocco Lighthouse (Italian: Faro di Punta Cala Scirocco) is an active lighthouse located on the southernmost extremity of Gorgona, one of the islands of the Tuscan Archipelago, 15 nautical miles (28 km; 17 mi) from Livorno.

== Description ==
The lighthouse consists of a cylindrical white fibreglass tower 5 metres (16 ft) high, placed at 45 metres (148 ft) above sea level. The lantern is powered by a solar unit and emits two white flashes every 10 seconds visible up to 9 nautical miles (17 km; 10 mi). The lighthouse is fully automated and is operated by Marina Militare identified by the code number 1992 E.F.

== See also ==
- List of lighthouses in Italy
- Gorgona
