= Leopold and Rudolf Blaschka =

German glass artists

Leopold Blaschka
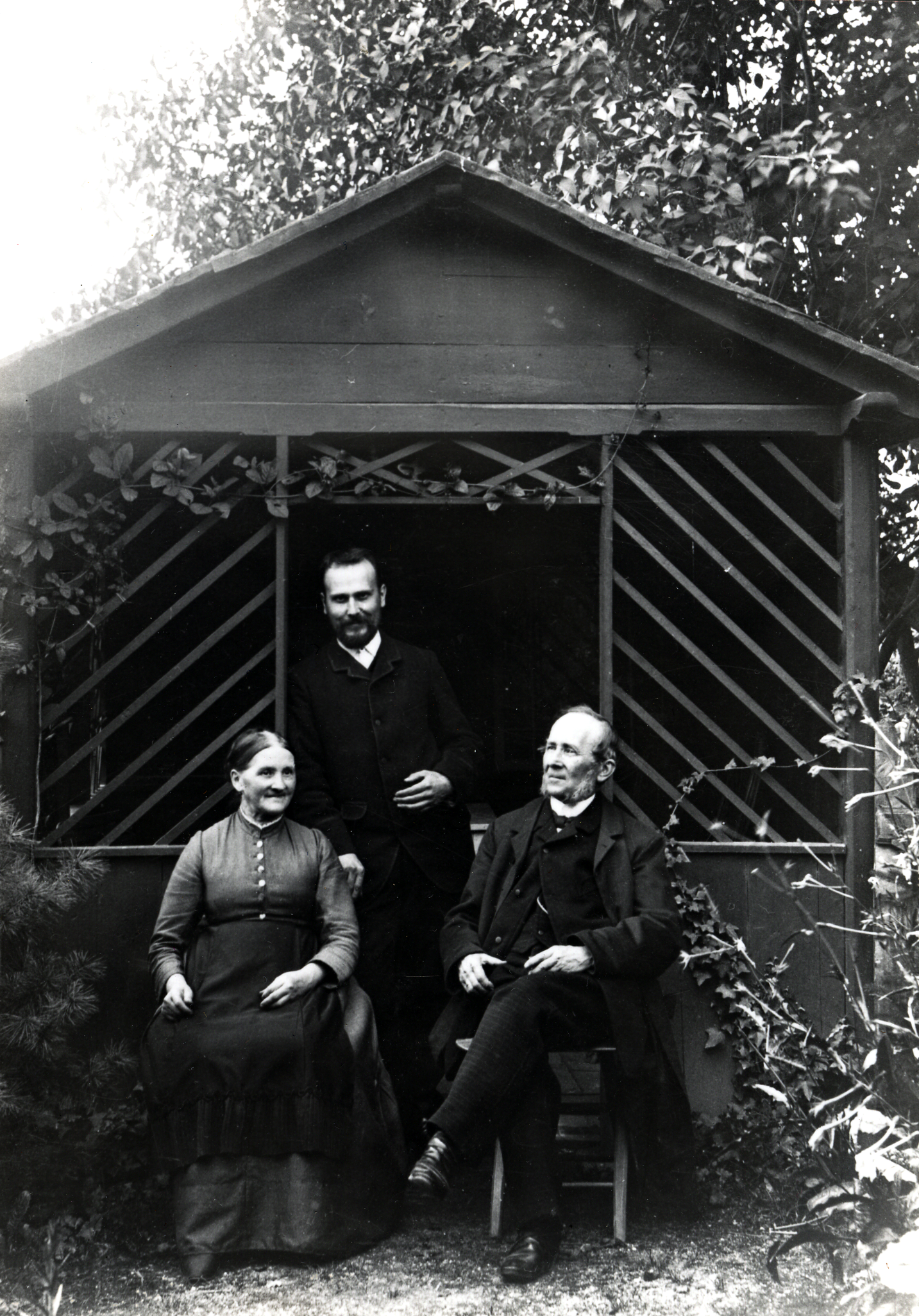
- Rudolf (standing), Caroline, and Leopold Blaschka in the garden of their Dresden home
- Born: May 27, 1822; Český Dub, Bohemia
- Died: July 3, 1895 (aged 73)
- Known for: Glass artist
- Notable work: Glass Flowers and Glass sea creatures
- Spouse(s): Caroline Zimmermann, Caroline Riegel

Rudolf Blaschka
- Born: June 17, 1857
- Died: May 1, 1939 (aged 81)
- Known for: Glass artist
- Notable work: Glass Flowers
- Spouse: Frieda

Leopold Blaschka (27 May 1822 – 3 July 1895) and his son Rudolf Blaschka (17 June 1857 – 1 May 1939) were glass artists from Bohemia, Czechia. They were known for their production of biological and botanical models, including glass sea creatures and Harvard University's Glass Flowers.

== Family background ==
The Blaschka family's roots trace to Josephthal in Erzgebirge, Bohemia, a region known for processing glass, metals, and gems. Members of the Blaschka family worked in Venice, Bohemia, and Germany. Leopold referred to this history in an 1889 letter to Mary Lee Ware:

Many people think that we have some secret apparatus by which we can squeeze glass suddenly into these forms, but it is not so. We have the touch. My son Rudolf has more than I have because he is my son and the touch increases in every generation. The only way to become a glass modeler of skill, I have often said to people, is to get a good great-grandfather who loved glass; then he is to have a son with like tastes; he is to be your grandfather. He in turn will have a son who must, as your father, be passionately fond of glass. You, as his son, can then try your hand, and it is your own fault if you do not succeed. But, if you do not have such ancestors, it is not your fault.

Leopold was born in Český Dub, Bohemia, one of the three sons of Joseph Blaschke. Leopold himself would later Latinize the family name to Blaschka. He and his son were native to the Bohemian Czech-German borderland.

Leopold was apprenticed to a goldsmith and gem cutter in Turnov, a town in the Liberec Region of today's Czech Republic. He then joined the family business which produced glass ornaments and glass eyes. Leopold developed a technique which he termed "glass-spinning" which permitted the construction of highly precise and detailed works in glass. He soon began to focus the business on manufacturing glass eyes.

In 1846, Leopold married Caroline Zimmermann, and within four years their son Josef Augustin Blaschka was born. Caroline and Josef both died of cholera in 1850. A year later, Leopold's father died. Leopold "sought consolation in the natural world, sketching the plants in the countryside around his home."

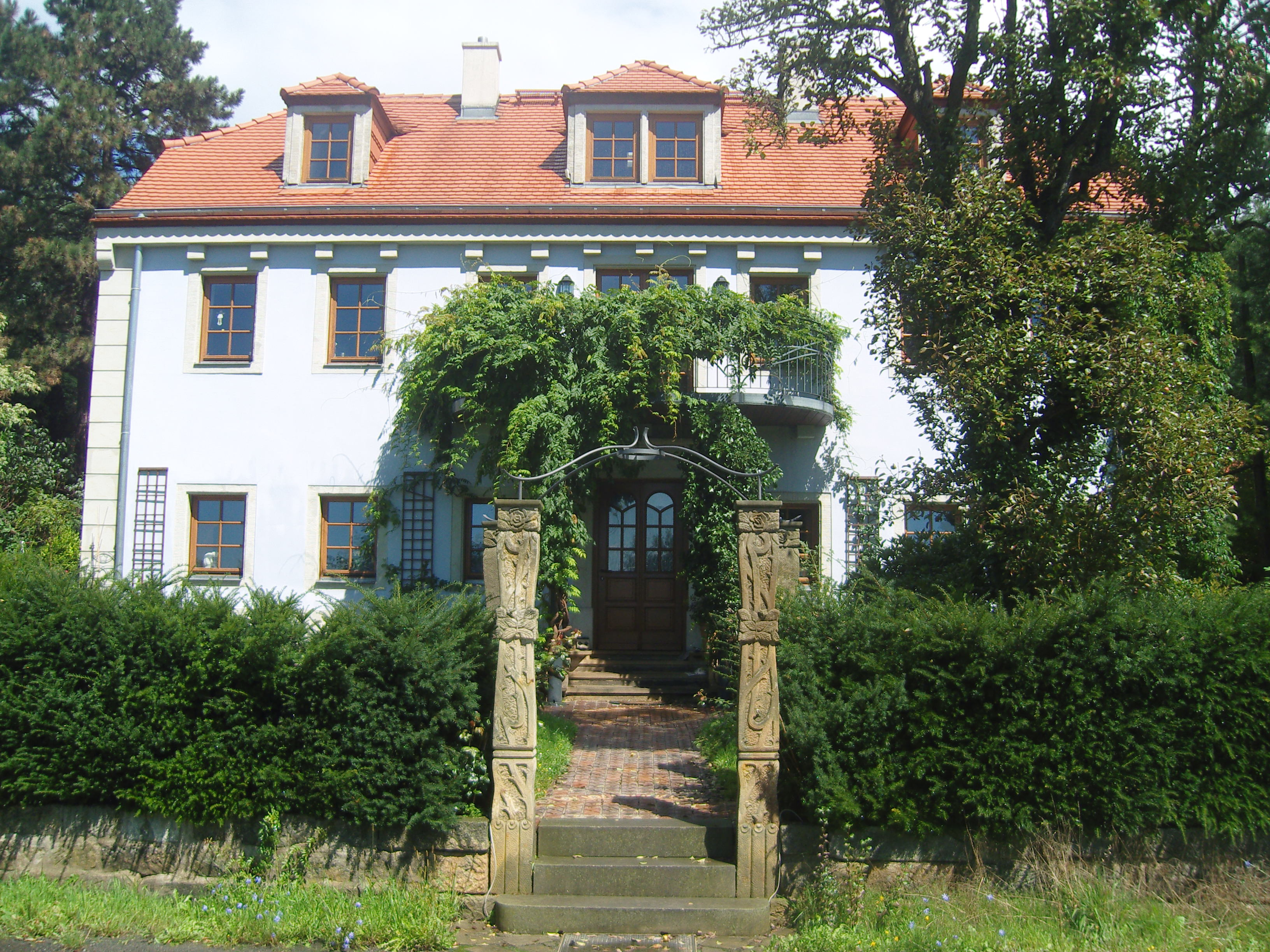
The Blaschka-Haus house in Dresden-Hosterwitz

== Glass marine invertebrates ==
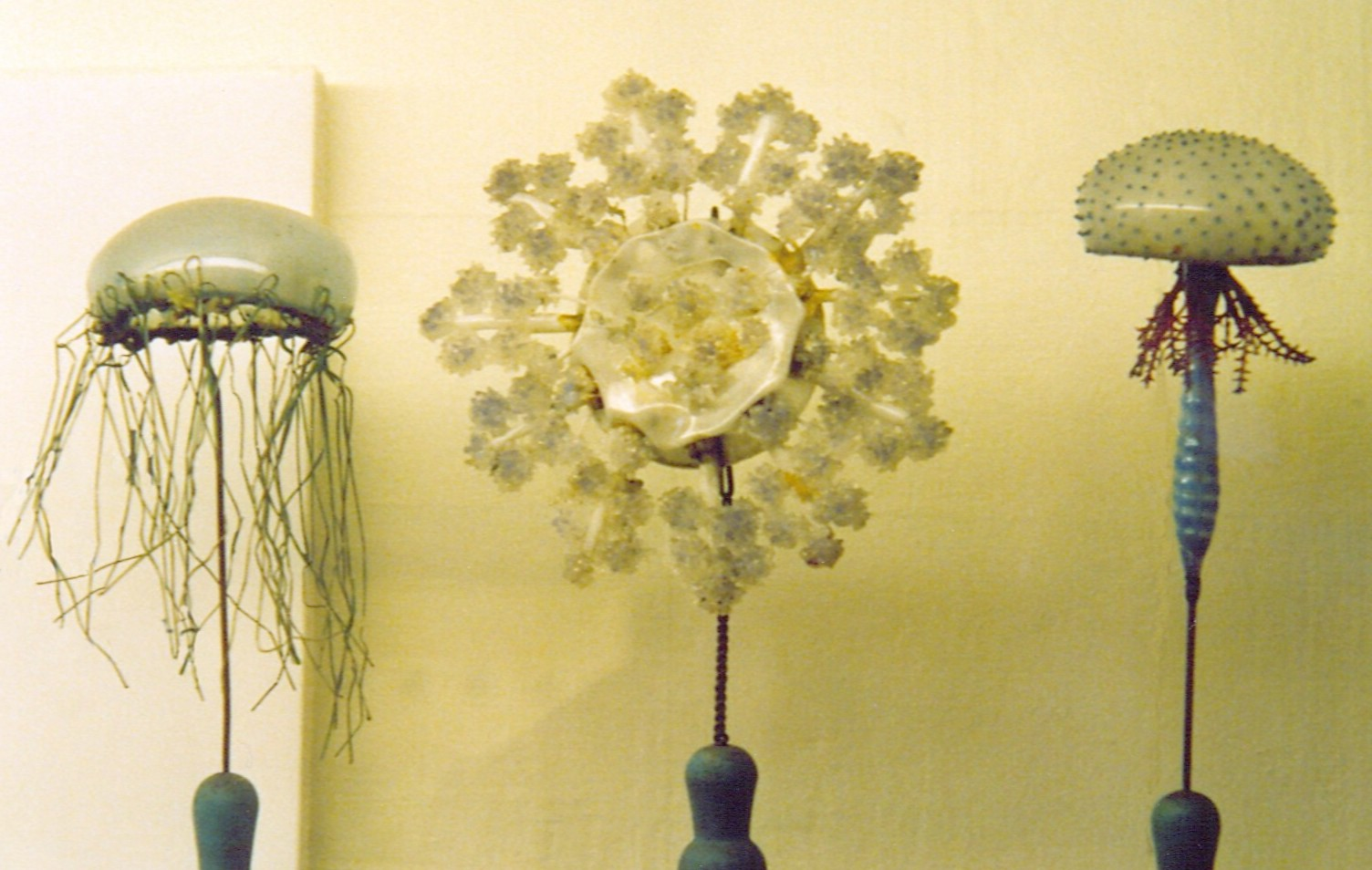
Blaschka model of jellyfish (Natural History Museum Pisa)

In 1853, Leopold travelled to the United States. While en route, the ship was becalmed for a fortnight due to no trade winds. During this time, Leopold studied and sketched local marine invertebrates, the glass-like transparency of their bodies intriguing him. He wrote:

It is a beautiful night in May. Hopefully, we look out over the darkness of the sea, which is as smooth as a mirror; there emerges all around in various places a flash like bundle of light beams, as if it is surrounded by thousands of sparks, that form true bundles of fire and of other bright lighting spots, and the seemingly mirrored stars. There emerges close before us a small spot in a sharp greenish light, which becomes ever larger and larger and finally becomes a bright shining sunlike figure.

On his return to Český Dub, Leopold focused on producing glass eyes, costume ornaments, lab equipment, and other goods and specialty items whose production was expected of master lampworkers. He married his second wife, Caroline Riegel, in 1854.

In his free time, he created glass models of plants. These would eventually become the basis of the Ware Collection of Blaschka Glass Models of Plants, also known as the Glass Flowers, which were collected many years later. During this period, Blaschka did not make any money producing the models. Eventually, however, the models attracted the attention of Prince Camille de Rohan, who arranged to meet with Leopold at Sychrov Castle in 1857. Prince Camille, an enthusiast of natural sciences, commissioned Leopold to craft 100 glass orchids for his private collection. In 1862, "the prince exhibited about 100 models of orchids and other exotic plants, which he displayed on two artificial tree trunks in his palace in Prague." This royal commission brought Blaschka's craft to the attention of Professor Ludwig Reichenbach, then director of the Natural History Museum in Dresden.

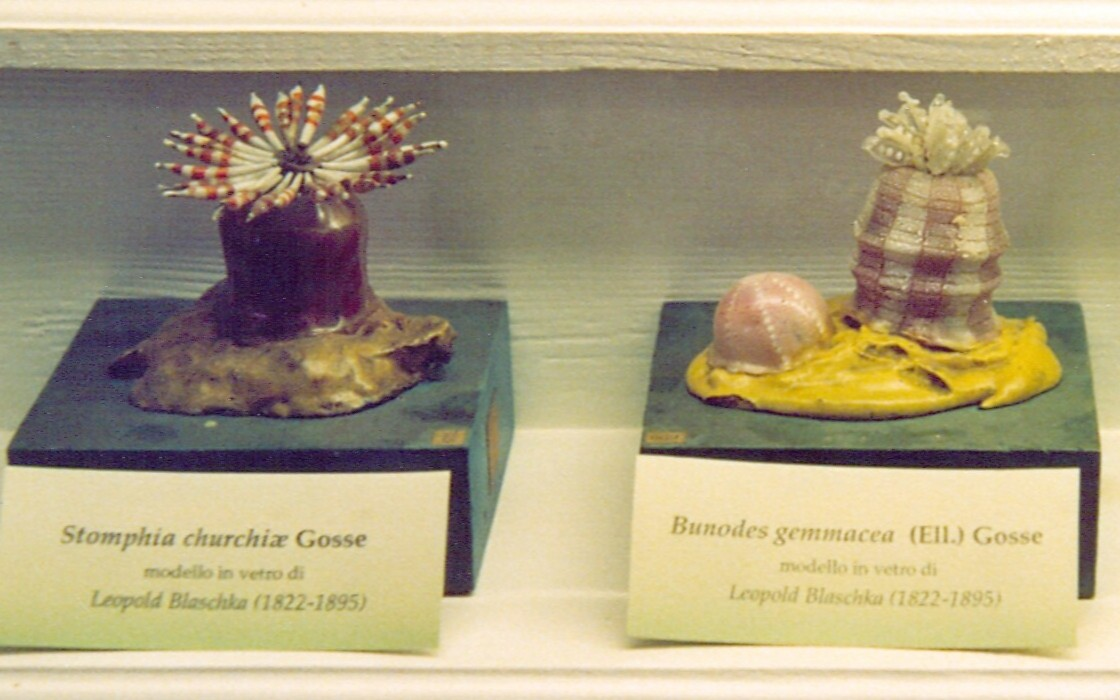
Blaschka model of sea anemones (Natural History Museum Pisa)

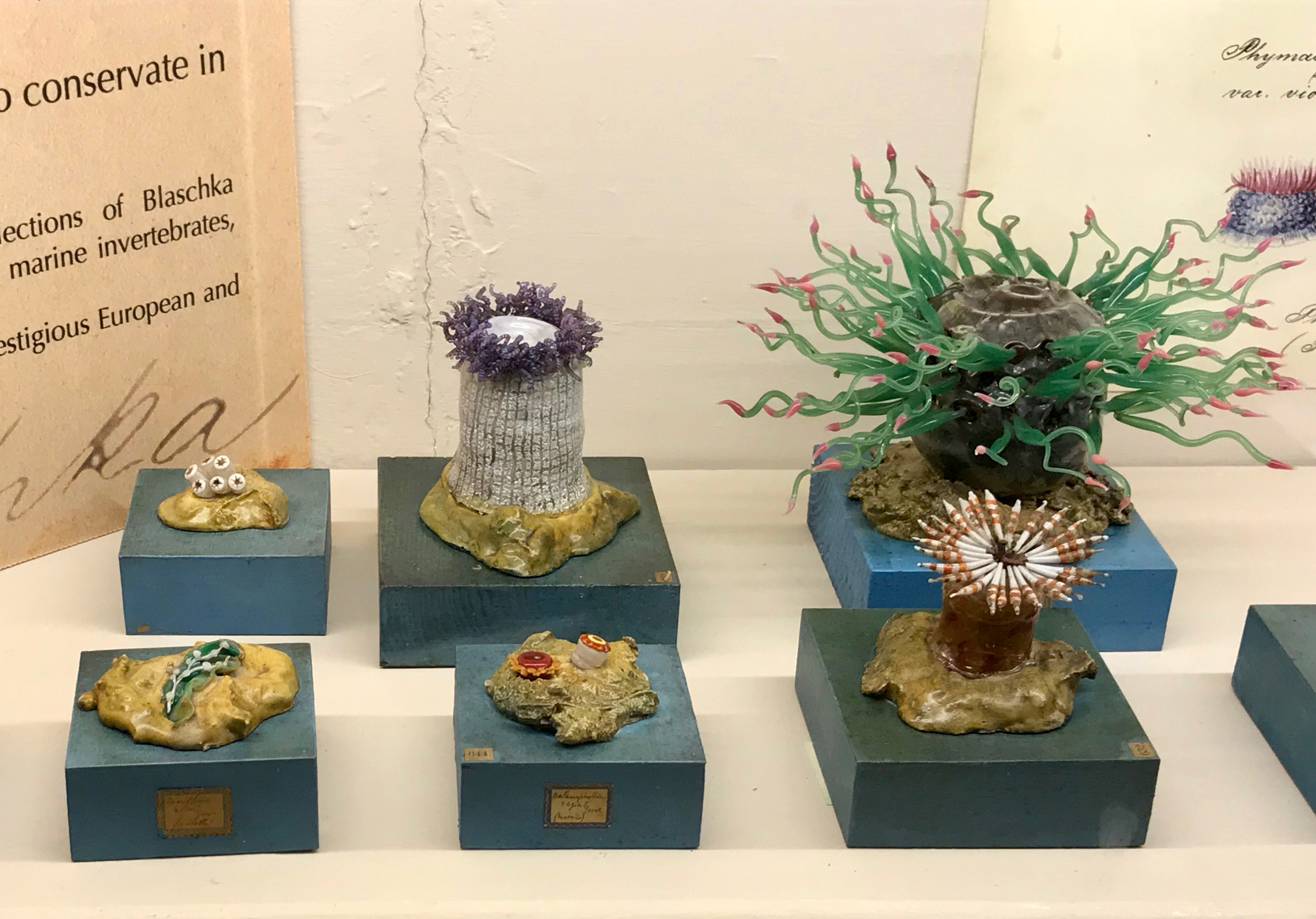
Blaschka glass models (Natural History Museum Pisa)

Professor Reichenbach admired the botanical models and convinced Leopold to try creating glass models of marine invertebrates. In the nineteenth century, the dominant method of displaying preserved marine invertebrates was wet-preservation, which involved taking a live specimen and placing it in a sealed jar, usually filled with alcohol. This killed the specimen and frequently decomposed the specimens beyond recognition.

Initially, the designs for these were based on drawings in books, but Leopold was soon able to use his earlier drawings to produce models of other species. His reputation spread quickly. Demand for the models pushed Leopold to further the training of his son and apprentice, Rudolf Blaschka. A year after the success of the glass sea anemones, the family moved to Dresden to give young Rudolf better educational opportunities.

== Belgium ==
In 1886, Edouard Van Beneden, founder of the Institute of Zoology, ordered 77 Blaschka models in order to illustrate zoology lessons. Some of these models are still on display at Treasure in the Aquarium-Museum in Liège.

== Contact with Harvard ==
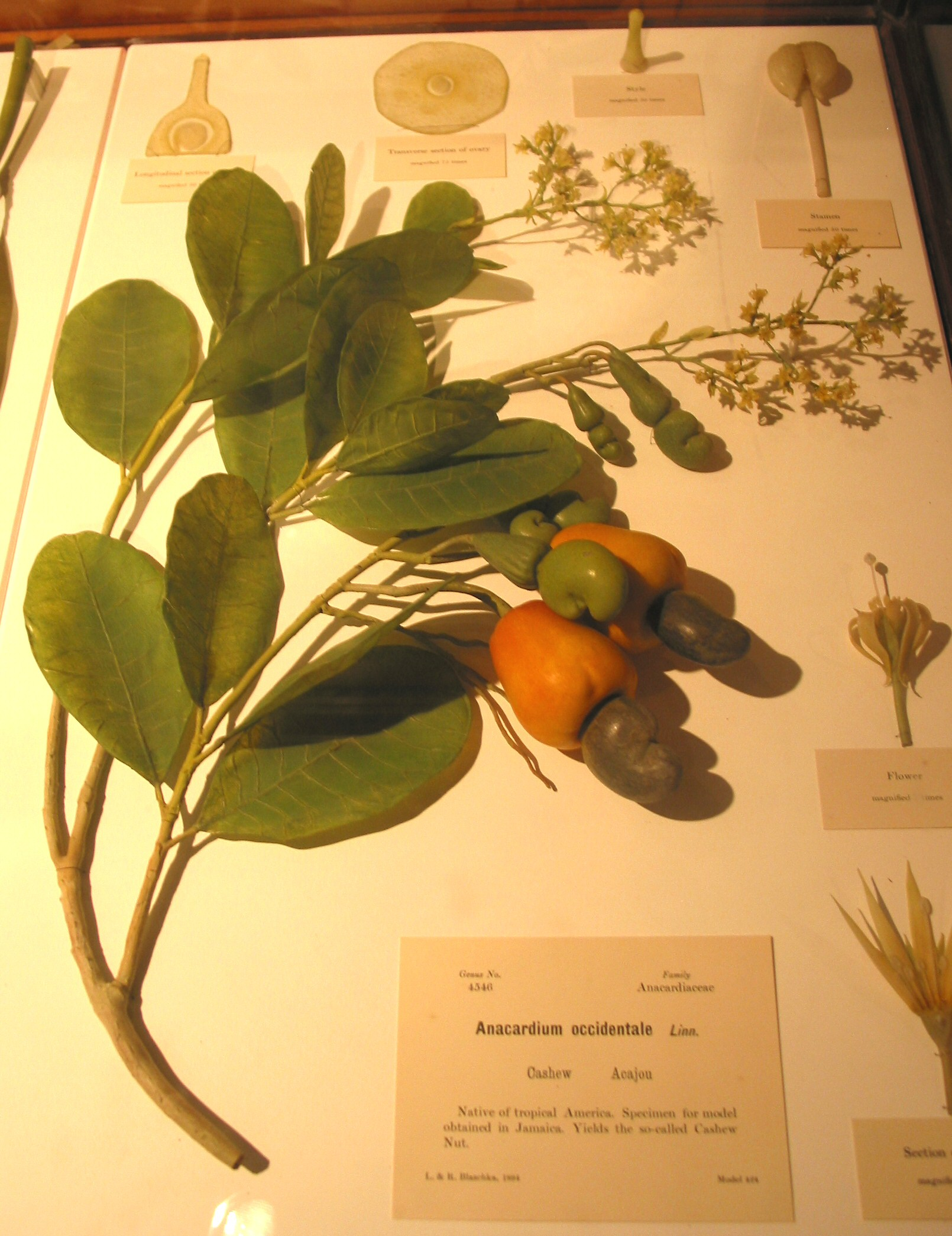
Part of the Harvard Glass Flowers collection

By 1880, Rudolf was assisting his father in producing the glass models, including the production of 131 Glass sea creature models for the Boston Society of Natural History Museum (now the Museum of Science). These models, along with the ones purchased by Harvard's Museum of Comparative Zoology, were seen by Professor George Lincoln Goodale, who was in the process of establishing and building the Harvard Botanical Museum's collection. In 1886, Goodale, traveled to Dresden to meet with the Blaschkas and request a series of glass botanical models for Harvard. Some reports claim that Goodale saw a few glass orchids in the room where they met, surviving from the work two decades earlier. Although initially reluctant, Leopold eventually agreed to send test-models to the U.S. Despite being badly damaged by U.S. Customs, Goodale appreciated their craftsmanship and showed them widely.

Goodale was convinced that Blaschka's glass art was a worthy investment for Harvard, which was a global centre for the study of botany. At that time, botanical specimens were almost entirely showcased as dried, pressed and labeled specimens called "specimina exsiccata" (dried specimens), but this presented a number of problems. Pressed plant specimens were two-dimensional and tended to lose their color and form, making them difficult to use as accurate teaching tools. Dried specimens were also quite heavy and bulky, making their transport and storage expensive. Having already seen the intact Blaschka models at Harvard, Professor Goodale decided to commission the glass flowers.

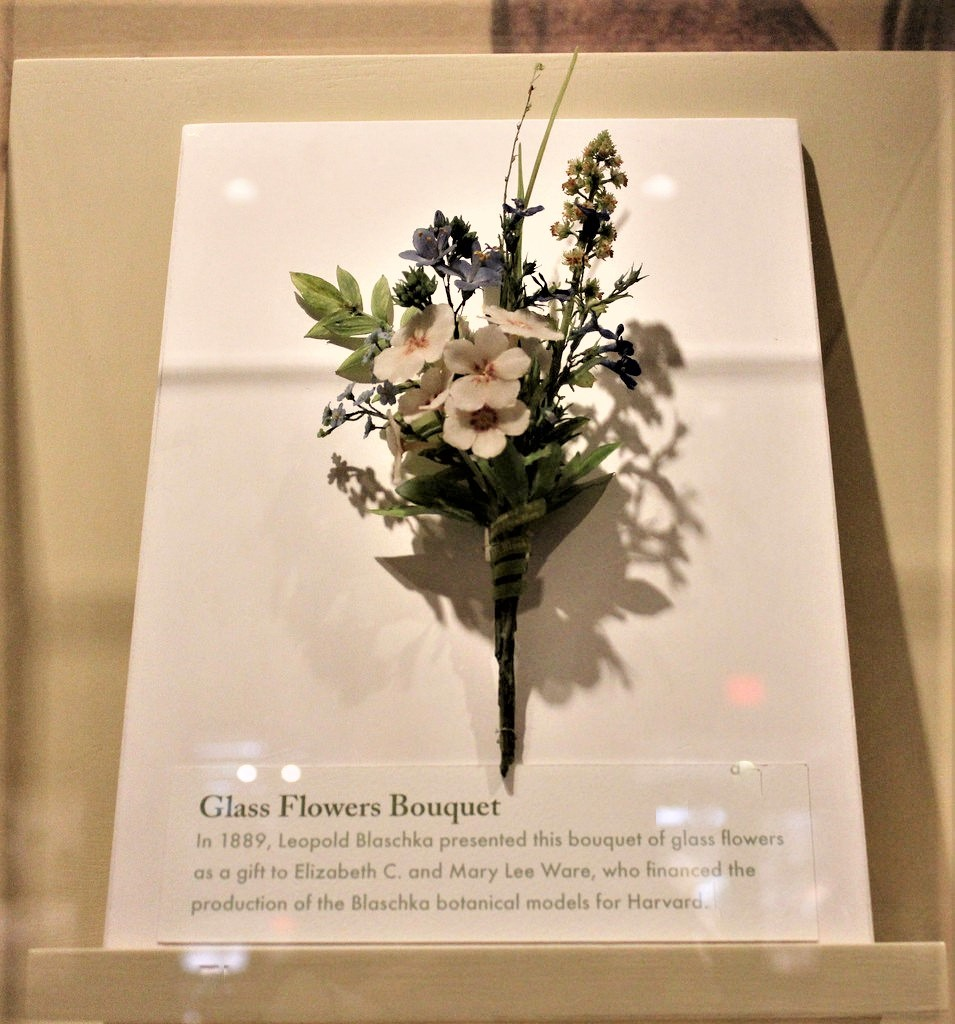
A photo of the bouquet of glass flowers which, in 1889, Leopold Blaschka made and gifted to Elizabeth C. and Mary L. Ware which, at some later date, was given to Harvard and is now part of the Glass Flowers exhibit.

To cover the expensive enterprise, Goodale approached former student Mary Lee Ware and her mother, Elizabeth C. Ware, already funders of Harvard's botany department. Mary convinced her mother to underwrite the consignment of the glass models, and in 1887, the Blaschkas contracted half of their time to producing the models for Harvard with the remaining time dedicated to making marine invertebrate models.However, in 1890, the Blaschkas insisted that it was impossible for them to craft the botanical models for half the year and do the sea creatures during the other half, declaring that they “must give up either one or the other." To resolve this, the Blaschkas signed an exclusive ten-year contract with Harvard to make glass flowers for 8,800 marks per year. New arrangements were also made to send the models directly to Harvard, where museum staff – possibly including Elizabeth Hodges Clark – could open them safely under the observation of Customs staff.

Their models showcased a range of plant specimens. In total, up to 164 taxonomic families and a diversity of plant part morphologies, including flowers, leaves, fruits, and roots, were created. Some were shown during pollination by insects; others were diseased in various ways. Goodale noted that the activity of the Blaschkas was "greatly increased by their exclusive devotion to a single line of work." Writing for the Annual reports of the President and Treasurer of Harvard College 1890–1891:

It has been only within a comparatively short time that I have discovered the cause of the great reluctance of the elder Blaschka to the undertaking at the outset. It appears upon inquiry that he had constructed a few models of plants before beginning the preparation of the animal models to which he owes his wide celebrity; but these models of plants were, he thought, not appreciated by the persons for whom he had made them. The first set of models passed through various vicissitudes, and finally found a home in the Natural History Museum in Liège, where they were at last destroyed by fire. The artist did not have courage to undertake the experiment again, when he was succeeding so well with his animal models. He regards it as a pleasant turn in his fortunes which permits him to devote all of his time to the subject of his earliest studies.

== Production of Glass Flowers ==
Claims arose that Leopold and his son were using secret methods to make their glass models. These claims were refuted by Leopold himself. Blaschka stated "One cannot hurry glass. It will take its own time. If we try to hasten it beyond its limits, it resists and no longer obeys us. We have to humor it."

The Blaschkas used a mixture of clear and colored glass, sometimes supported with wire, to produce their models. Many pieces were painted by Rudolf. In order to represent plants which were not native to the Dresden area, father and son studied foreign plant collections at Pillnitz Palace and the Dresden Botanical Garden. They also grew some from seeds sent from the United States. In 1892, Rudolf was sent on a trip to the Caribbean and the U.S. to study additional plants, making extensive drawings and notes. At this point, the number of glass models sent annually to Harvard was approximately 120.

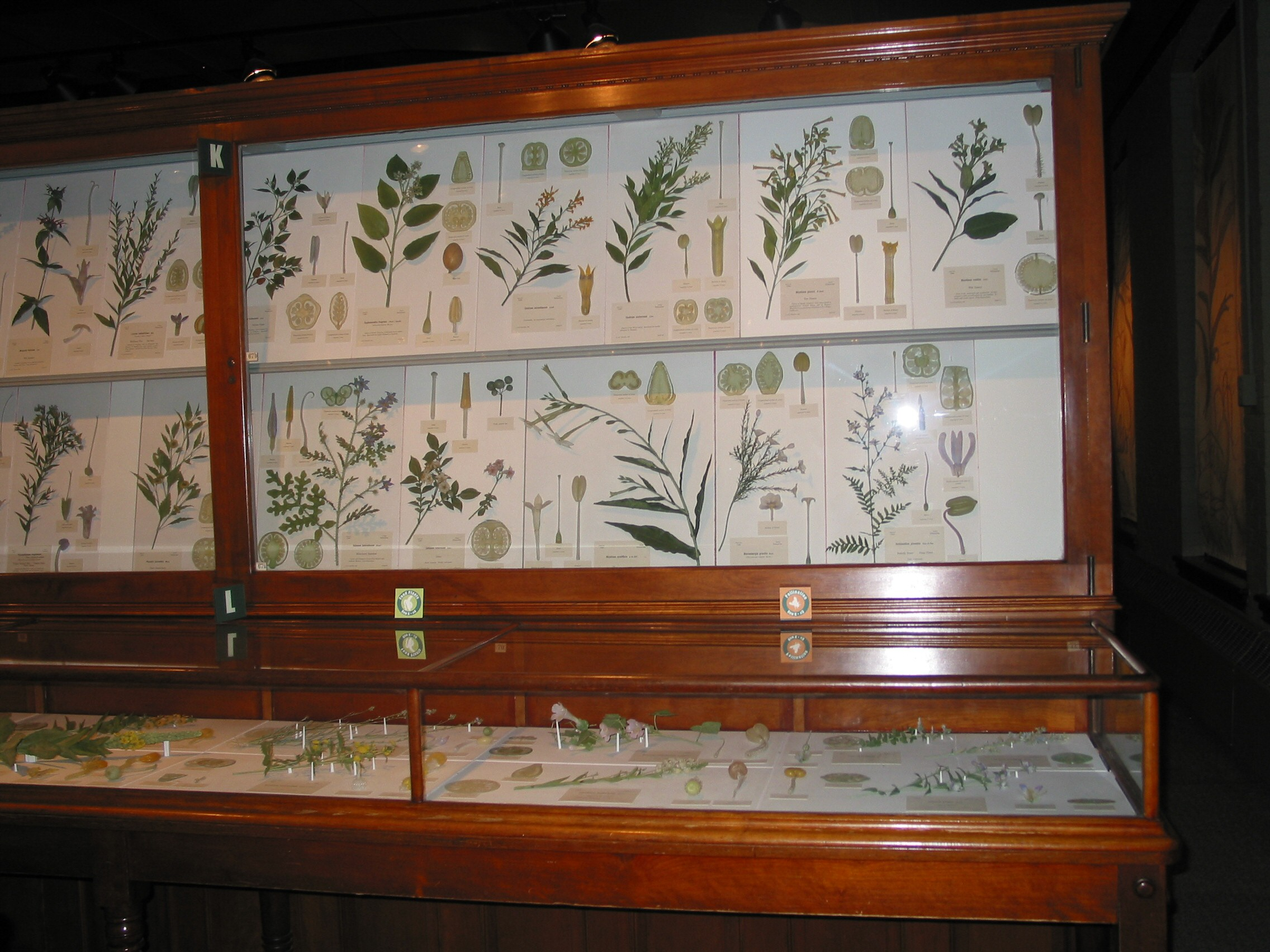
A section of the Glass Flowers exhibit

Leopold died in 1895 while Rudolf was on a second trip to the U.S. Rudolf continued to work alone, but production slowed. By the early twentieth century, he found that he was unable to buy high quality glass and began making his own. This was confirmed by Mary Lee Ware during her 1908 visit to Rudolf. In a letter she later wrote to the second director of the Botanical Museum, Professor Oakes Ames, she observed how "one change in the character of [Rudolf's] work and, consequently in the time necessary to accomplish results since I was last here, is very noteworthy. At that time […] he bought most of his glass and was just beginning to make some, and his finishes were in paint. Now he himself makes a large part of the glass and all the enamels, which he uses powders to use as paint." In addition to funding and visiting the project, Mary took an active role in its progress, going so far as to personally unpack each model and make arrangements for Rudolph's fieldwork in the U.S. and Jamaica.

Ames was less passionate about the Glass Flowers than his predecessor had been. However, he soon requested what he referred to as "Economic Botany", asking Rudolf to make glass models of olives and grapes. This eventually evolved into a series of glass fruit models in both rotting and edible condition. Ames continued to exchange letters with Mary Lee Ware discussing the project and commented on the quality and speed of production declining with Rudolf's age, expressing concern whether Blaschka could continue to produce models of satisfactory quality.

Rudolf continued making models for Harvard until 1938. By then 80 years old, he announced his retirement. Neither he nor his father Leopold had taken on an apprentice and Rudolf left no successor, as he and his wife Frieda had no children.

In total, Leopold and Rudolf made approximately 4,400 models for Harvard, 780 of which showed species at life-size. As of 2016, fewer than 75 per cent of the models are on regular display at the Harvard Museum of Natural History in the Ware Collection. Older exhibitions contained up to 3,000 models, but this number was reduced during renovations of the museum's collections. Unlike the glass sea creatures which were "a profitable global mail-order business", the Glass Flowers were commissioned solely for Harvard.

== Legacy ==
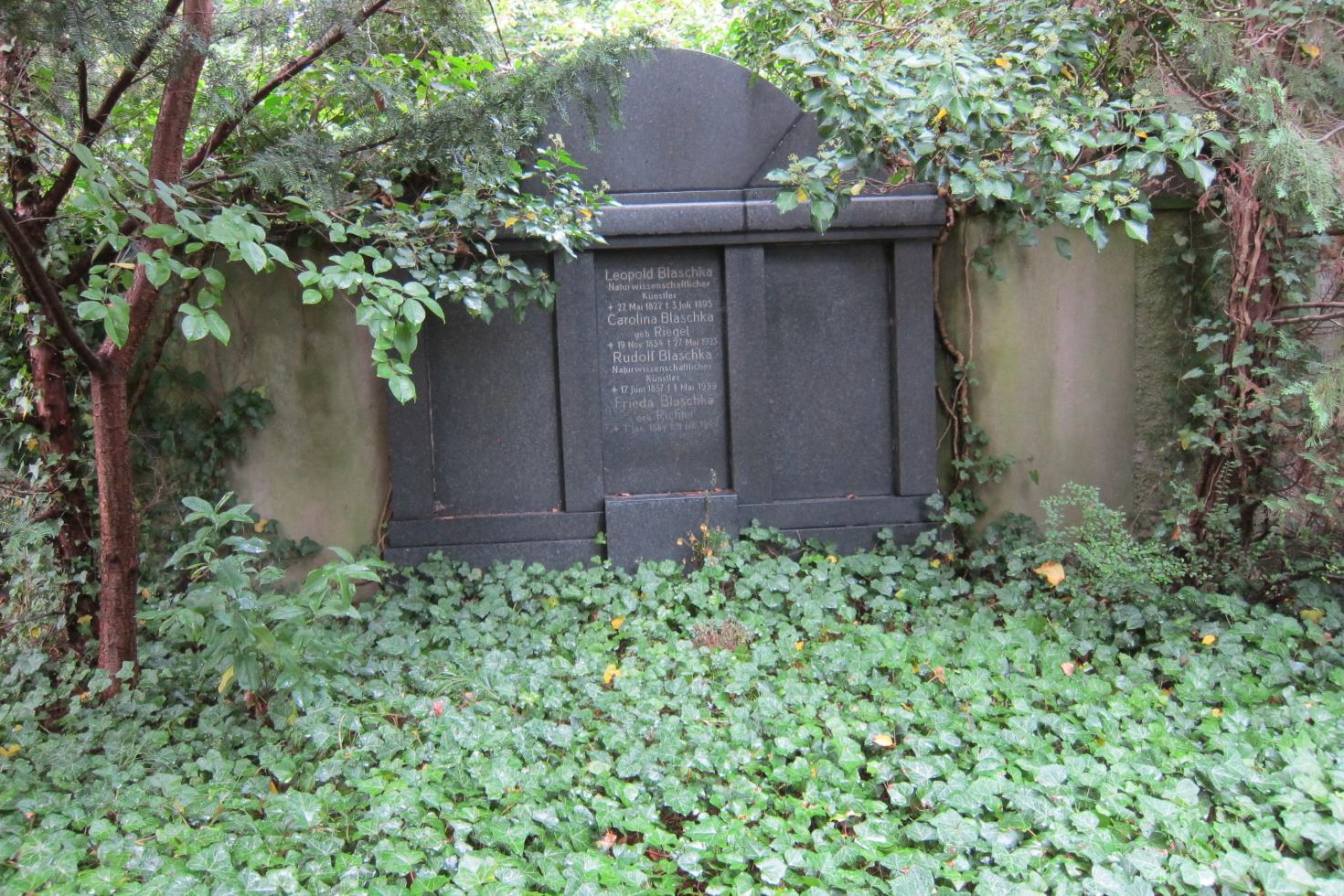
The grave of Leopold, Caroline, Rudolf and Frieda Blaschka

Over the course of their collective lives, Leopold and Rudolf crafted as many as ten thousand glass marine invertebrate models and 4,400 botanical models, the most famous being Harvard's Glass Flowers.

The Blaschka studio survived the bombing of Dresden in World War II and, in 1993, the Corning Museum of Glass and Harvard Museum of Natural History jointly purchased the remaining Blaschka studio materials from Frieda Blaschka's niece, Gertrud Pones.

The Pisa Charterhouse, which houses the Museum of Natural History of the University of Pisa, has a collection of 51 Blaschka glass marine invertebrates.

Leopold and Rudolf and their spouses are buried together in the Hosterwitz cemetery in Dresden.

== See also ==
- Robert Brendel
- The Ware Collection of Blaschka Glass Models of Plants, Harvard Museum of Natural History
- Blaschka Collection, Museum of Natural History of the University of Pisa
