= Frescobaldi =

Family and wine company

House of Frescobaldi Frescobaldi
- Noble house Business family
- Country: Republic of Florence; Duchy of Florence; Grand Duchy of Tuscany; Kingdom of Etruria; United Provinces of Central Italy; Kingdom of Sardinia; Kingdom of Italy
- Current region: Italy; European Union
- Origin: March of Tuscany; Val di Pesa; Chianti
- Founded: XII century
- Current head: Lamberto Frescobaldi
- Traditions: Catholicism
- Website: frescobaldi.com

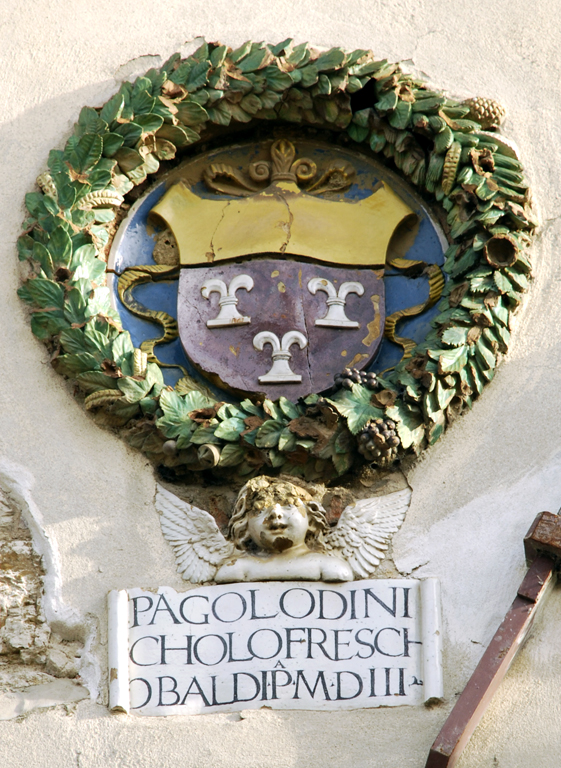
The Frescobaldi coat of arms at the palace of the Podestà in Galluzzo

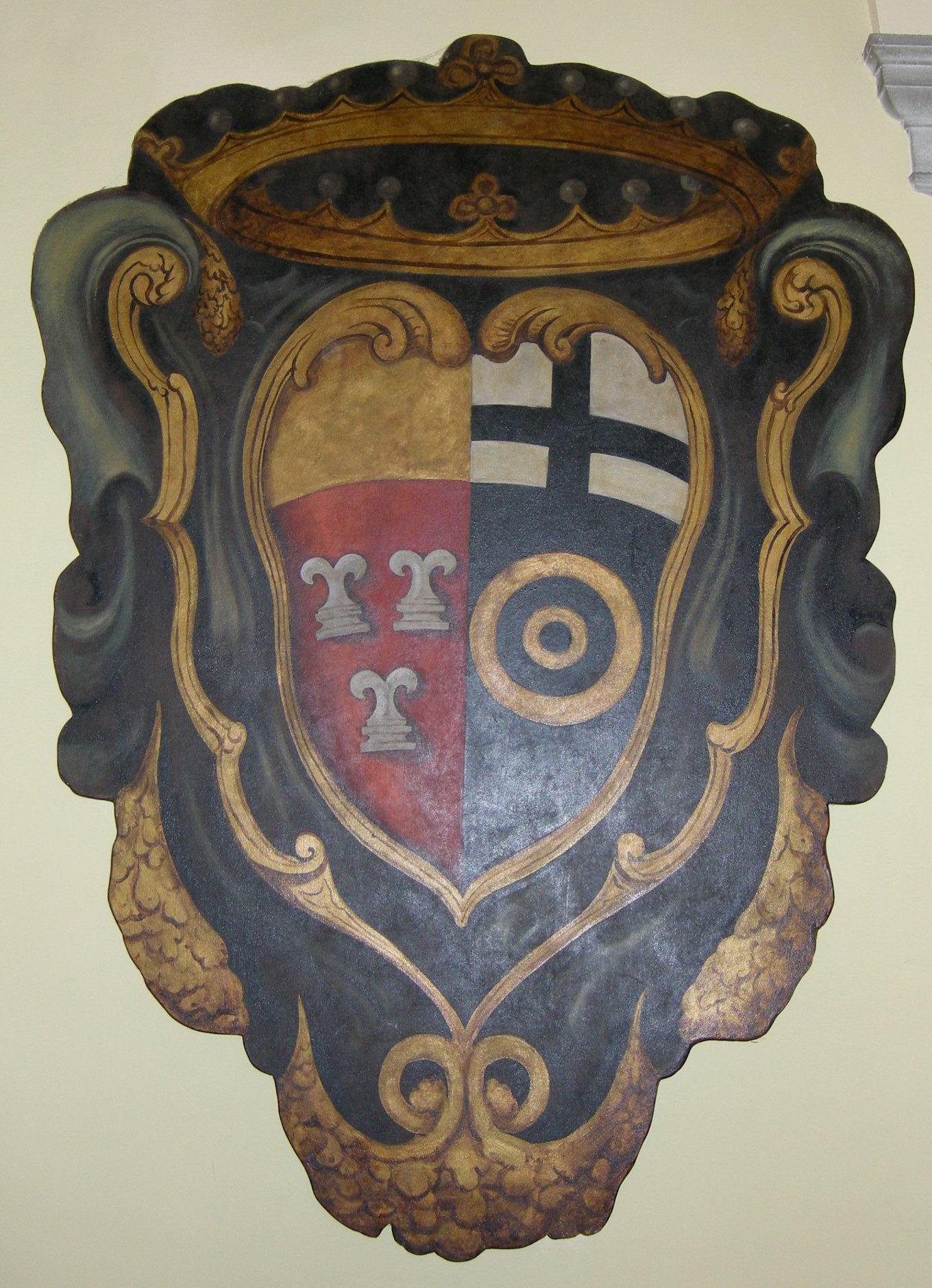
Impalement of the coat of arms of Frescobaldi (left) and Albizzi (right), probably created upon the wedding of Angiolo Frescobaldi and Leonida degli Albizzi (19th century)

The Frescobaldi are a prominent Florentine noble family who have influenced the political, economic, and social fabric of Florence.

Originating from Val di Pesa in the Chianti region, they first rose to prominence in the twelfth century.

== Early history ==
The Frescobaldi family initially established their economic foundation through the Italian cloth merchant community in Bruges, later expanding their banking activities to their hometown of Florence during the 13th century. Their influence in Florence was built upon controlling key guilds, notably the Arte della Lana (wool guild), the Arte di Calimala (guild of foreign cloth merchants and finishers), and the Cambio (money exchange).

The Frescobaldi significantly impacted European politics and economics, notably through financing the English monarchy. In the late 13th century, they established a banking branch in London, financing King Edward I's military campaigns and managing the English wool trade, essential for Florentine textile industries. Their prominent role included handling English customs revenues starting in 1307 and managing papal tax collection in England, indirectly funding Crusades. They also provided significant financial operations in Germany and Scotland, reflecting their expansive international presence.

In Florence, the Frescobaldi were closely associated with significant architectural contributions, including the construction of the Ponte Santa Trinita in 1252 by Lamberto Frescobaldi, connecting key parts of the city. They were committed supporters of the Medici family, and several Frescobaldi members received honorary senatorial titles. Additionally, the family donated land for the construction of the Basilica di Santo Spirito, Filippo Brunelleschi's final major work.

Beyond finance and politics, the Frescobaldi produced notable literary figures, including the poet Dino Frescobaldi (died c. 1316), a contemporary and friend of Dante Alighieri, and Leonardo Frescobaldi, who documented his travels to Egypt and the Holy Land in 1384, providing valuable historical insights into the regions' cultures and economies.

== Wine production ==
The Frescobaldi family began producing Tuscan wine in 1308 and quickly established an esteemed clientele. An intriguing historical detail from 1308 includes a documented exchange where Michelangelo Buonarroti traded his artwork for Frescobaldi wine. Additionally, the Frescobaldis supplied wine to King Henry VIII of England; surviving contracts in the family archives bear the English king's signature.

Vittorio degli Albizi In 1855, who became related to the Frescobaldi family through the marriage of his sister Leonia to Angiolo Frescobaldi, was among the first to experiment with modern winemaking techniques on the family's estates. His contributions in 1855 notably included introducing grape varieties such as Chardonnay, Cabernet, and Merlot to Tuscany.

== The coat of arms ==
The Frescobaldi family crest follows the Guelph heraldic tradition, characterized by a horizontal division of the shield. In the upper portion, the coat of arms features a solid gold field, symbolizing nobility and prestige. In the lower portion, on a red background, three silver chess-rooks stand out, distinctive elements of the lineage that evoke solidity, tradition, and family continuity.

== See also ==
- Gorgona Agricultural Penal Colony
