= Natural History Museum of the University of Pisa =

Italian natural history museum at Pisa

- Museo storia naturale università di Pisa
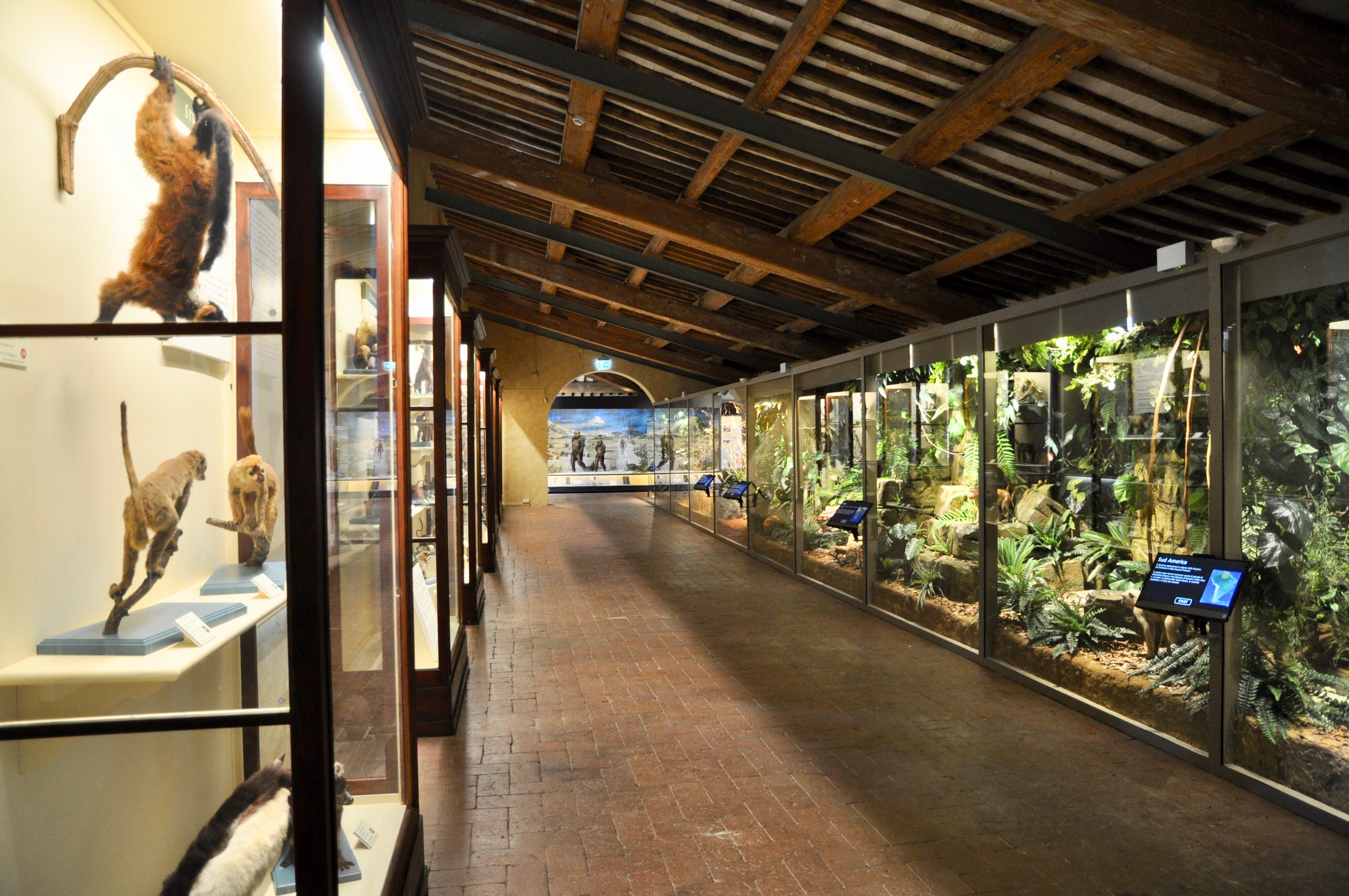
- Natural History Museum of the University of Pisa

- Location of Museum in Pisa
- Established: 1596
- Location: via Roma 79, Calci
- Coordinates: 43.721947°N 10.52334°E
- Type: Natural history museum
- Collections: Natural history
- Visitors: 71033
- Director: Bonaccorsi Elena
- Website: https://www.msn.unipi.it/it/

The Natural History Museum of the University of Pisa, located in Calci, about 9 kilometres (6 mi) east of Pisa, is dedicated to the study and display of natural history. The museum is home to one of the largest collections of cetacean skeletons in Europe. In addition to its extensive cetacean holdings, the museum's oldest collections include seashells amassed by the Italian invertebrate scientist, Niccolò Gualtieri.

== Organization ==
The museum is organized into two sectors.

One sector includes the

- Aquarium
- Temporary Exhibitions
- Prehistory of Monte Pisano

The other sector includes the permanent exhibitions of

- Historical Gallery
- Garden
- Amphibians and Reptiles gallery
- Mammals gallery
- Hall of Archaeocetes
- Cetacean gallery
- Hall of the evolution of man
- Mineral gallery
- Room "The Earth between myth and science.”
- Geological eras gallery
- Dinosaur Halls
- Evolution of birds

== Aquarium ==
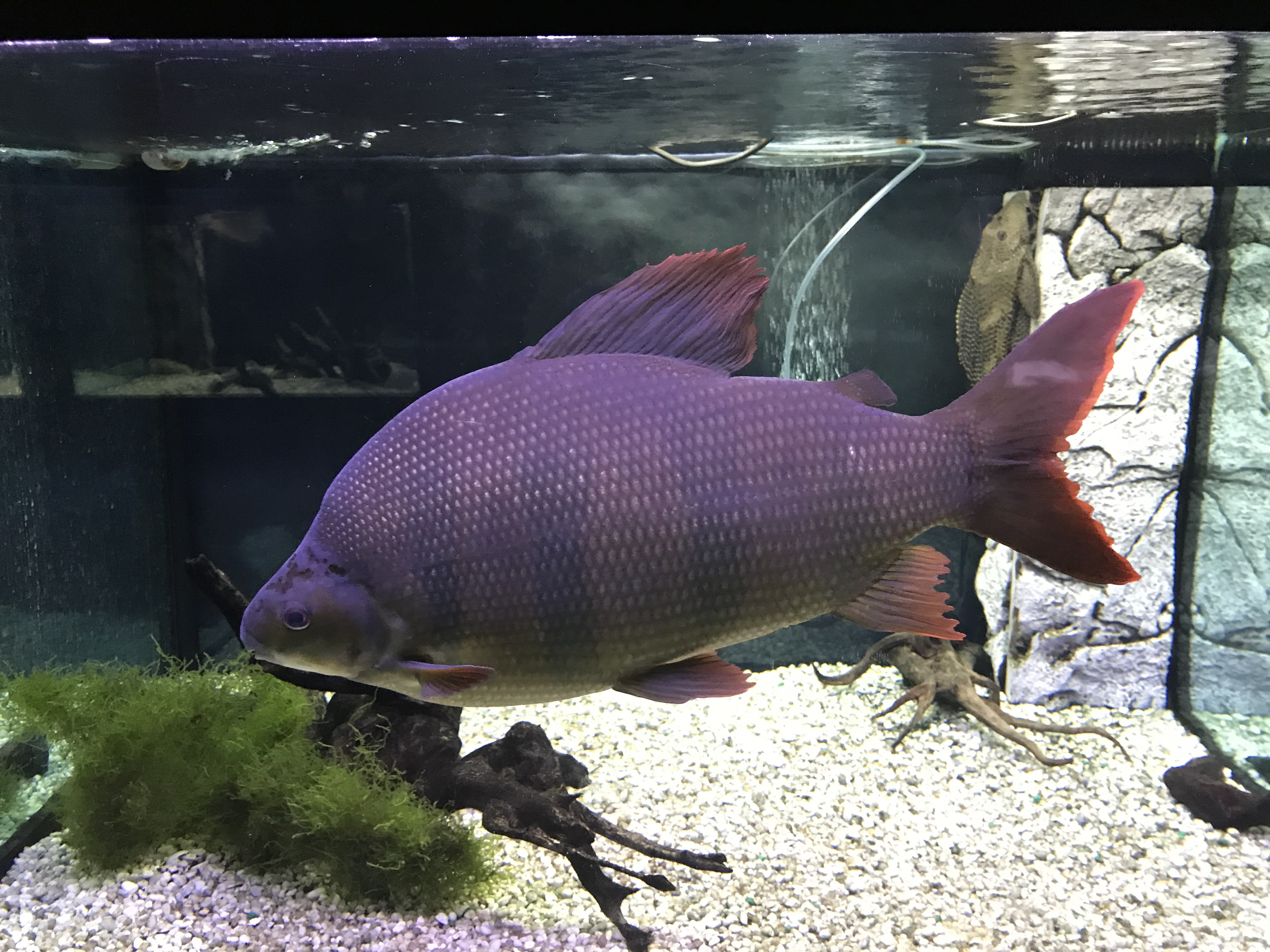
Six-banded distichodus

The museum has the largest freshwater aquarium in Italy at 60,000 liters. The first sector of the exhibition is entirely dedicated to Lake Tanganyika and hosts various specimens of cichlids belonging to the Tropheus. The second section houses dipnoi, arowana, some freshwater puffers, an axolotl colony, a softshell turtle and a mata mata specimen. The third sector is the largest tank and is dedicated to Koi carp. The fourth and fifth sectors show off world fish biodiversity with Asian giant gourami, the American Oscar fish and the alligator pike.

== Prehistory of Monte Pisano ==
This room is dedicated to the excavations that were started in 1847 of the Lion's Cave in Agnano.

== Historical gallery ==
=== Blaschka glass collection ===
Leopold Blaschka produced marine invertebrate glass reproductions. The museum has 51 examples. The collection is a remarkable example of the fusion between science and craftsmanship.

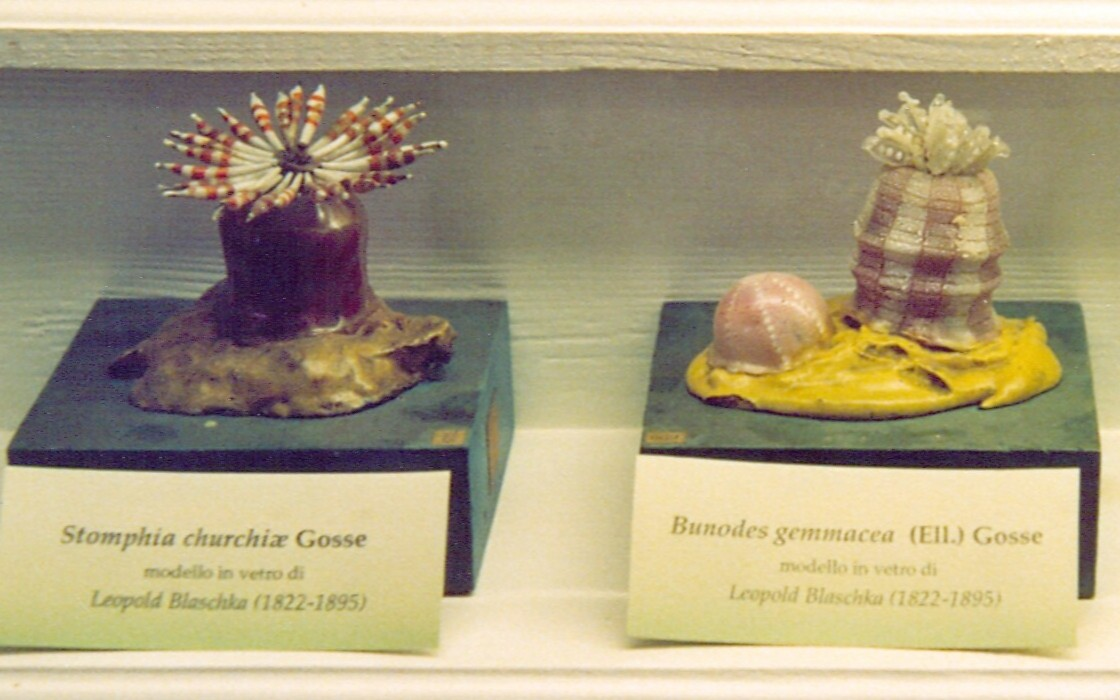
Blaschka glass sculpture

== Garden ==
A project to devote the garden to the plants of Monte Pisano is currently underway.

== Mammal gallery ==
Over 300 specimens are spread over the third floor, including an example of the Père David’s deer.

== Hall of Archaeocetes ==
There is a 50 thousand-year-old fossil skeleton of Hippopotamus antiquus. Also, there is a reconstruction of Indohyus, a terrestrial mammal ancestor of modern cetaceans. The exhibition then continues with the cast of a skeleton and the reconstruction of an Ambulocetus natans, an ancient cetacean that was probably able to both swim and walk.

There is a holotype of Aegyptocetus tarfa found in 2002 by a marble cutter of Pietrasanta in a block of Egyptian limestone. The path then ends with a series of casts of fossils belonging to Cynthiacetus.

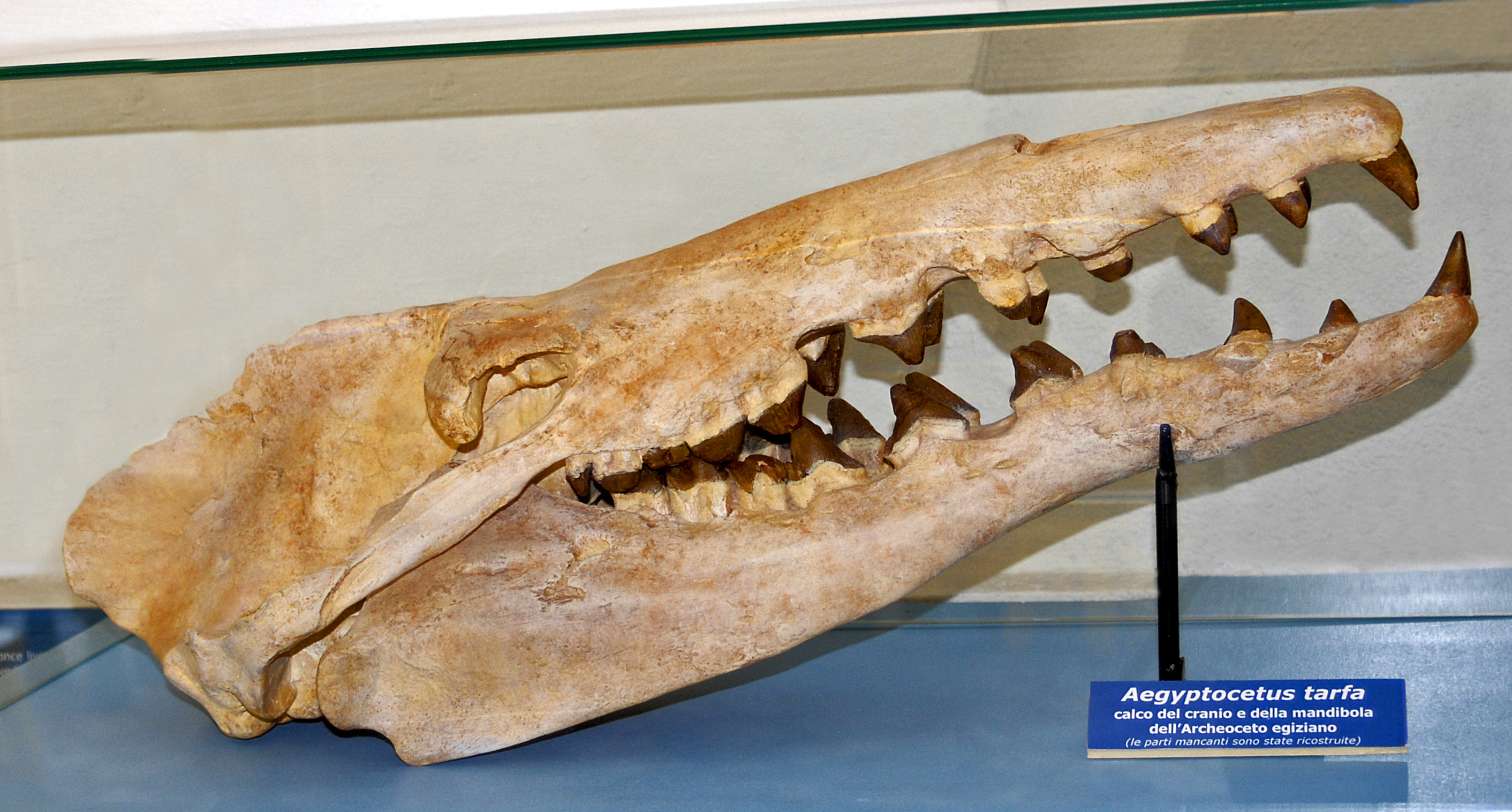
Skull of Aegyptocetus tarfa

== Cetacean gallery ==
The cetacean collection was significantly enriched between the second half of the 19th century and the beginning of the 20th century, thanks to then-director Sebastiano Richiardi to create a collection that had at least one specimen for each species of existing cetacean.

The cetacean gallery is a 110-meter long space surmounted by a gabled roof. When the friars still inhabited the Certosa, it was used for drying hay and grains, which were then stored in the numerous silos located at the edge of the structure. The exhibition was organized in 2018 into eight thematic areas containing more than 28 skeletons from the 27 species present in the collection, as well as 11 life-sized models including a baleen, five casts of fossils mostly discovered and studied by the team of the University of Pisa, such as that of Livyatan melvillei as well as from real fossils, such as the holotypes of Balaenula astensis, found in Portacomaro in 1940.

Most are skeletal remains, although there are also preparations preserved in liquid. While this is not the largest in the number of specimens, it has the largest diversity with 27 different species. The gallery contains complete skeletons of Hector's dolphin, White-beaked dolphin, Finless porpoise, and the very rare Andrews' beaked whale; as well as those of the Sei whale and blue whale, the latter purchased, again by Richiardi, in 1900 from the Museum of Natural History of Bergen, in Norway. Also, the museum also houses the only adult skeletons of Humpback whales and North Atlantic right whales present in Italy, the only two Killer Whale skeletons in Italy, the only two complete with beluga, and the only one complete with boreal hyperodon. Alongside the collection of current cetaceans, the museum also possesses various finds of fossil cetaceans of various origins and acquisitions. However, a large part of them was donated to the Museum by the Florentine paleontologist Roberto Lawley, such as an individual's remains from Etruridelphis giulii.

There is also a blue whale, and the fin whale. The collection includes the mandible of a sperm whale beached in 1714 in Populonia.

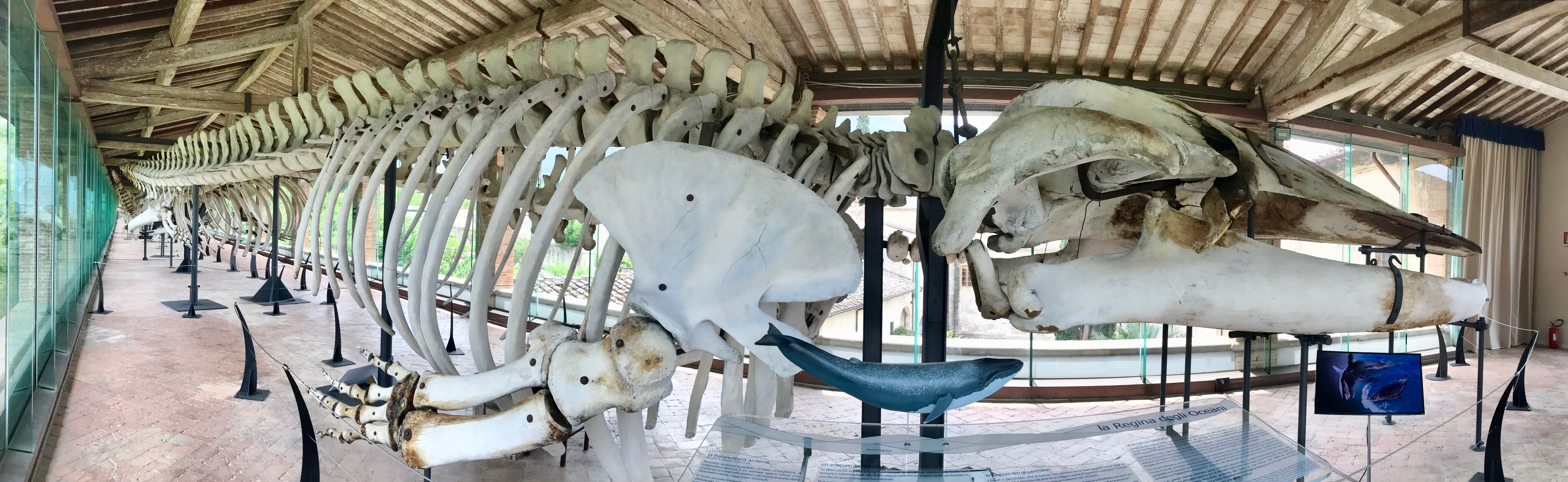
Complete blue whale skeleton over 22 meters long. Purchased in 1900 from the Natural History Museum of Bergen, Norway, for about three thousand gold lire. Arrived by ship to the port of Livorno and then transported to Pisa on wagons.

== Hall of the evolution of man ==
This hall includes a full-scale reconstruction of a portion of the 31,000-year old painted wall of the Chauvet cave (Ardèche, France).

== Mineral gallery ==
A large collection of minerals from the Tuscan area as well as the largest Italian meteorite: the 48 kg Bagnone’s Octahedrite.

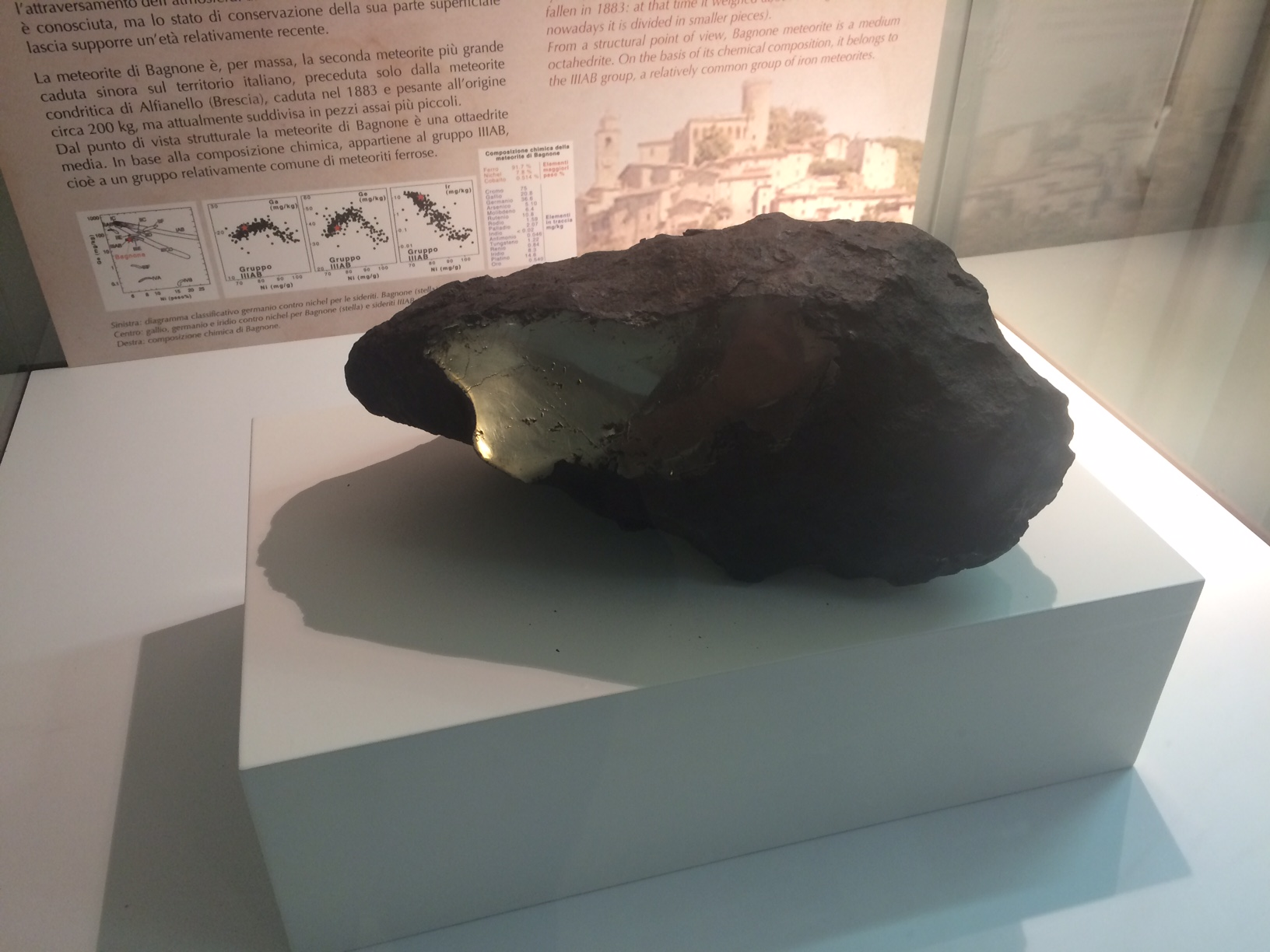
Meteorite of Bagnone

== "The Earth between myth and science" ==
A 9-meter by 5-meter wooden reconstruction of Noah's Ark with 160 animals beside a cyclops and a unicorn.

The biblical myth is contested by descriptive panels, samples of volcanic rocks, and explanations of Earth's origin through evolution.

== Dinosaur gallery ==
In 2020, this gallery is partly under construction. The collection includes, Carnotaurus sastrei, Amargasaurus cazaui, Kritosaurus and a nesting plain of Saltasaurs.

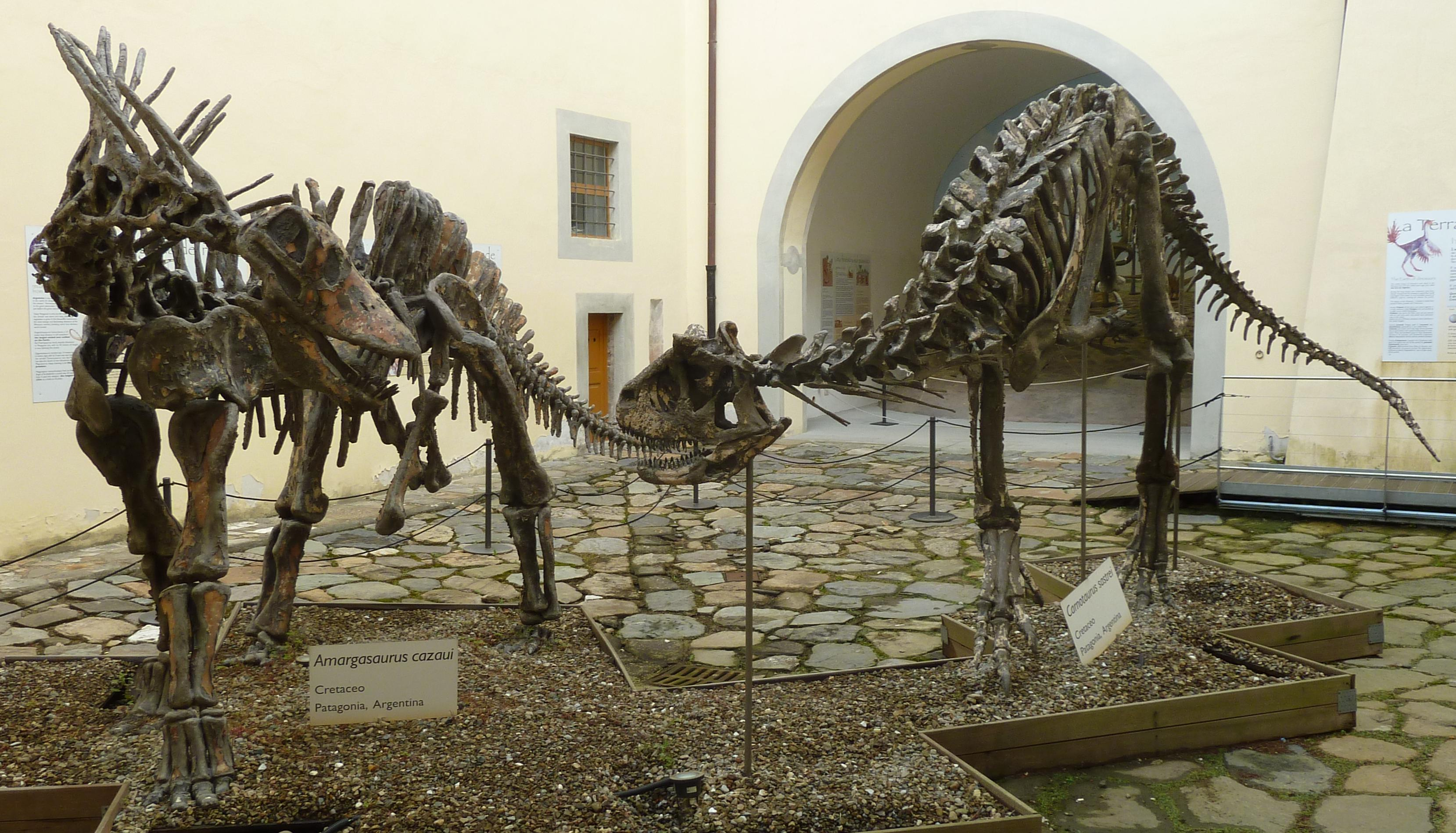
Dinosaur court.

== Evolution of birds ==
19 life-size avian models from the Mesozoic explain the transition from dinosaurs to birds. The museum contains the osteology collections of Sebastiano Richiardi. The bird collection consists of 9,000 mounts, 1,000 skins, 275 skeletons, 1,100 eggs, 800 nests, and 450 anatomical specimens.

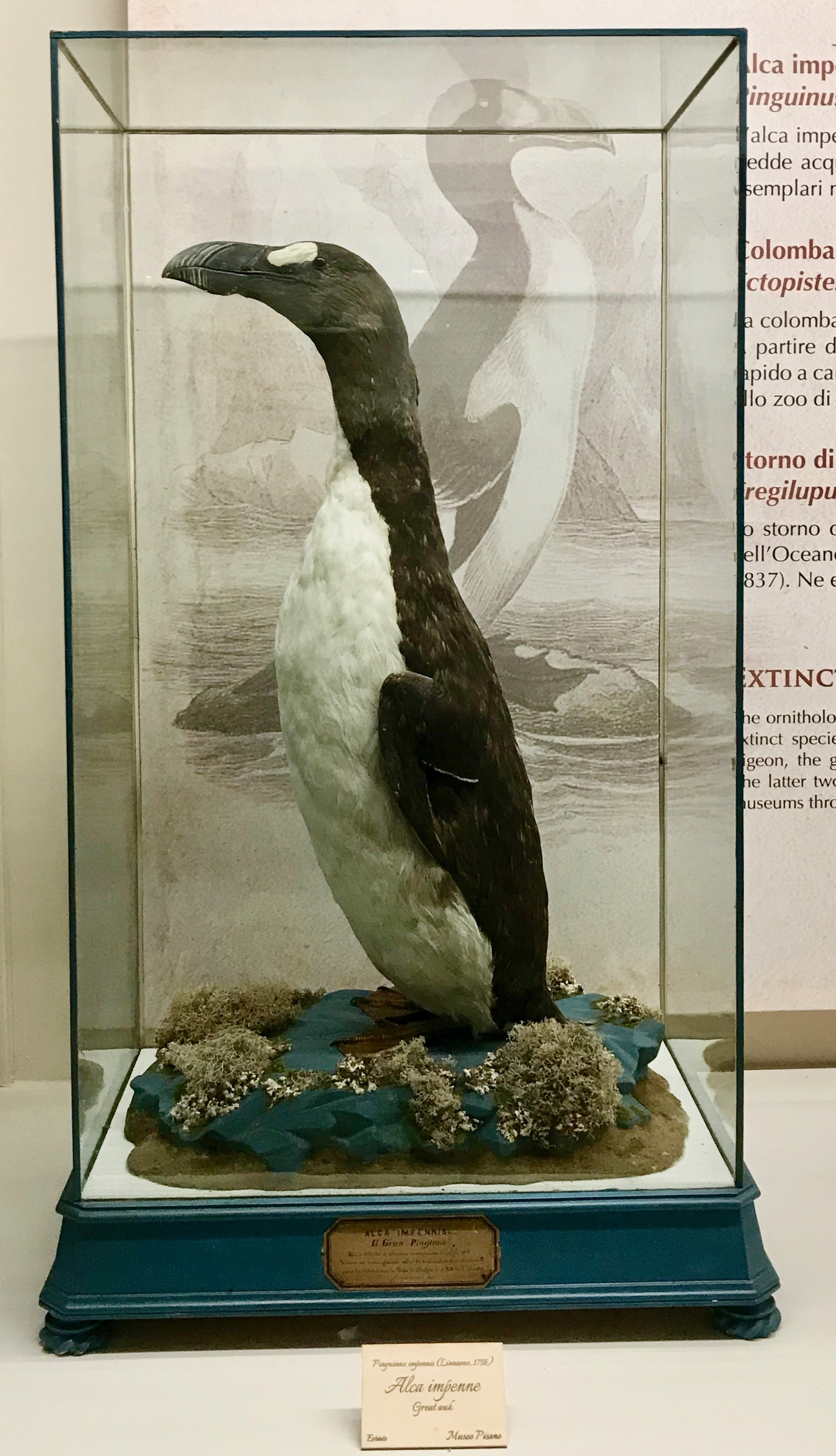
Great auk

== Mollusc collections ==
The museum contains:

- 700 samples collected by Niccolò Gualtieri, which were studied by Carl Linnaeus . Linnaeus used many of these specimens in his tenth edition of his Systema Naturae.
- Samples from Georg Eberhard Rumphius acquired in 1747 by Francesco di Lorena.

== Insect collections ==
The museum contains insects collected by:

- Édouard Ménétries
- Carlo Giuseppe Gené
- Imre Frivaldszky
- Pierre François Marie Auguste Dejean
- Maximilian Spinola
- Carlo Passerini

== History ==
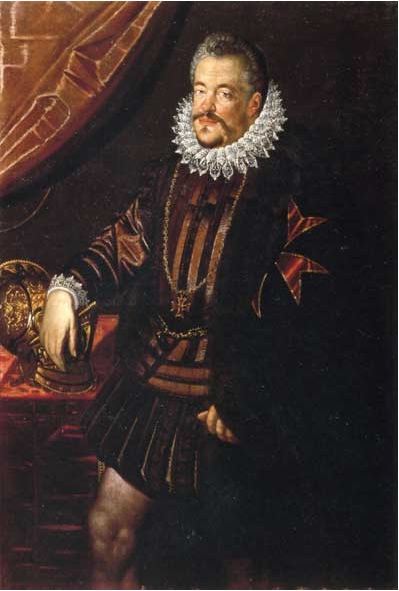
Ritratto di Ferdiando I

The museum dates back to the 16th century when the Grand Duke of Tuscany Ferdinando I de 'Medici set up a cabinet of curiosities attached to the Giardino dei Semplici.

The direction was entrusted to Luca Ghini, founder and curator of the botanical garden. In 1595, Ferdinando ordered that the various Florentine naturalistic collections was brought into the museum and founded one of the first museums in the world.

The museum was enriched with new collections: in particular, in 1747, Francis I of Lorraine bought an important part of the malacological collection for the museum of the Florentine physician Niccolò Gualtieri, including more than three thousand specimens collected by the Dutch naturalist Georg Eberhard Rumphius.

In the 19th century, the museum had its period of maximum expansion. In 1814, the University of Pisa decided to separate the chairs of scientific teaching, entrusting Gaetano Savi with that of Botany and Giorgio Santi that of zoology, paleontology and geology. This separation of the chairs meant that the museum, which also included the botanical collections under a single direction, was divided into two distinct administrations with greater decision-making autonomy.

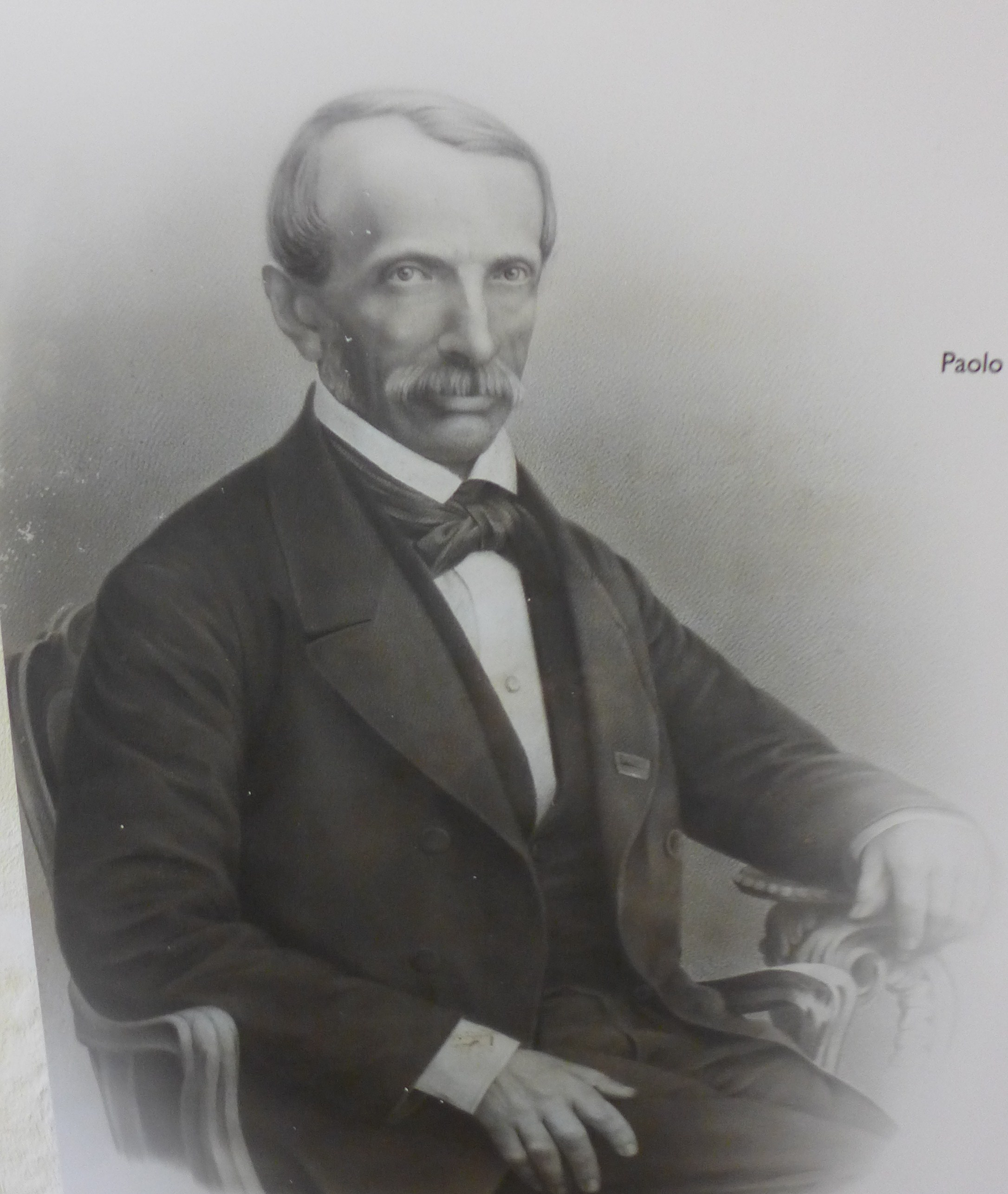
Paolo Savi

Under the direction of Paolo Savi, the collections were enriched, the exhibition spaces were enlarged, and hundreds of writings were published. Savi called upon the Neapolitan Leopoldo Pilla to fill the museum and this brought a large number of Vesuvian rocks and crystals with him.

The museum was shaken by the world wars. During the Second World War, some of the collections were damaged by Allied bombings.
