= Gorgona Agricultural Penal Colony =

Prison farm located on the island of Gorgona, Italy

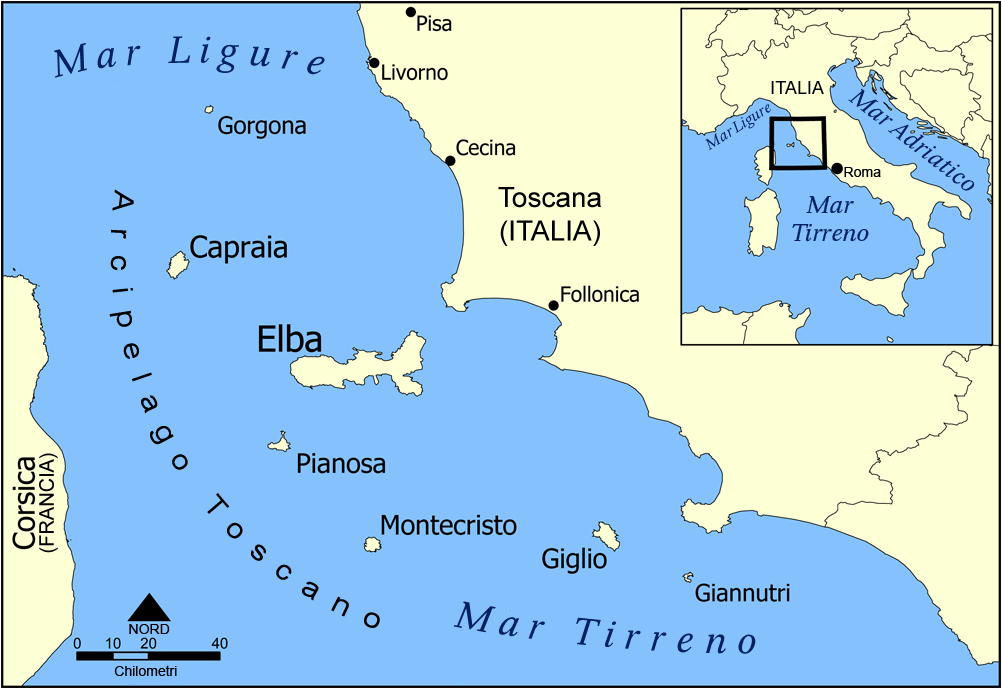
- The Tuscan Archipelago with the northern island of Gorgona located west of Livorno
- Location: Gorgona
- Status: Operational
- Security class: Minimum
- Population: 100 (2019)
- Opened: 1869

The Gorgona Agricultural Penal Colony is an Italian prison farm located on the island of Gorgona in the Tuscan Archipelago. The island has a long history of being home to monastic communities, with the Gorgona Abbey being a prominent establishment on the island for most of the Middle Ages. The abbey was abandoned in 1425, and in 1869 Gorgona became an agricultural penal colony for the Kingdom of Italy.

The penal colony is home to around 100 inmates who have been convicted of murder and other violent crimes, with a long waiting list for other inmates awaiting transfer to the island. Here, the prisoners are able to move freely on the grounds, tending to agricultural work, with only an evening curfew and lockdown.

At the colony, prisoners tend to a vineyard owned by the Frescobaldi family, which has been producing wine in Tuscany for over 700 years. They produce a white wine blend of Ansonica and Vermentino, labeled as Gorgona, that will retail for ~€60-70 a bottle and be featured on high-end Italian restaurant wine lists, including a Michelin three-star restaurant in Florence. In addition to viticulture and winemaking, the penal colony is also home to a vegetable garden and olive tree grove where olive oil is produced, as well as livestock facilities which produce high quality cheese, chicken, and pork.

== History ==
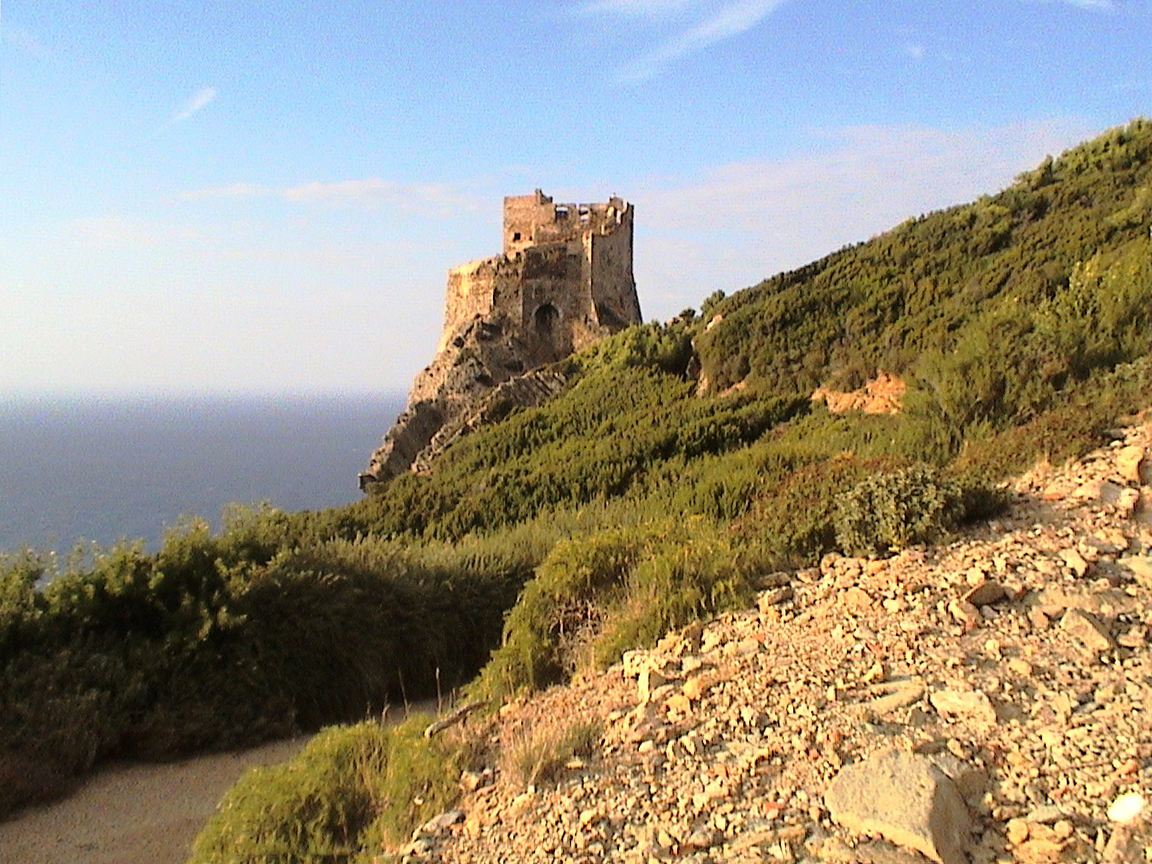
One of the old fortification towers that is still standing on the western coast of the island.

The island is named after the Gorgons of Greek mythology, which were three sisters, Medusa, Stheno, and Euryale, who had hair made of venomous snakes that could turn any observer into stone. Since the 4th century AD, Gorgona has been home to various monastic orders including the Benedictines, until it finally came under the influence of the Carthusians in the 14th century. Eventually, the Gorgona Abbey was abandoned in 1425, though the lands remained under the control of the Carthusians until the 1770s, when the order sold its lands to the Grand Duke of Tuscany (the future Leopold II, Holy Roman Emperor), who turned the island into a fishing village and attempted to repopulate it. Following the unification of Italy in the mid-19th century, the island came under the control of the Kingdom of Italy, which converted the former monastery lands into an experimental agricultural penal colony in 1869.

== Prison life ==
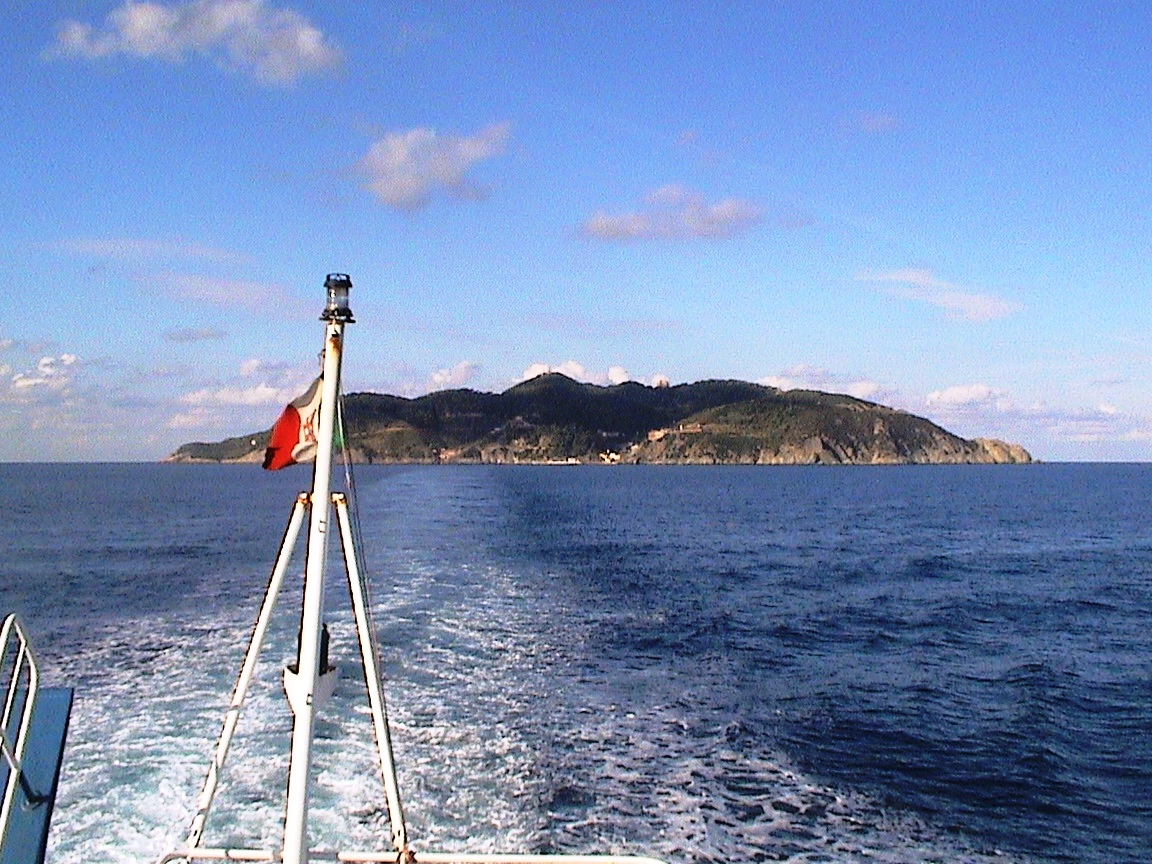
The only way to approach the island and penal colony is by boat. Instead of docking at the island, passengers are brought to shore by police launch boats.

Located 35 km (22 mi) across the Ligurian Sea from the Italian port city of Livorno, Gorgona island is considered "impossible" to escape (no one is known to have ever verifiably escaped), which has allowed the Italian penal authorities to give prisoners more freedom to move around the island. While in most Italian prisons, inmates spend the majority of their time in lockdown, on Gorgona, inmates spend most of their time outside doing agricultural and viticultural work or tending livestock. The prisoners are only required to return to the facility for lockdown in the evening.

In the history of the penal colony, only one prisoner is believed to have "escaped"; whether or not they survived the long swim to the Italian mainland is not known since they were never found. The only access to the island is via a weekly ferry that brings visitors and family members to the island, but the boat is not allowed to dock at the island. Instead, police launch boats transfer passengers from the boat to the island.

== Vineyard and winemaking ==
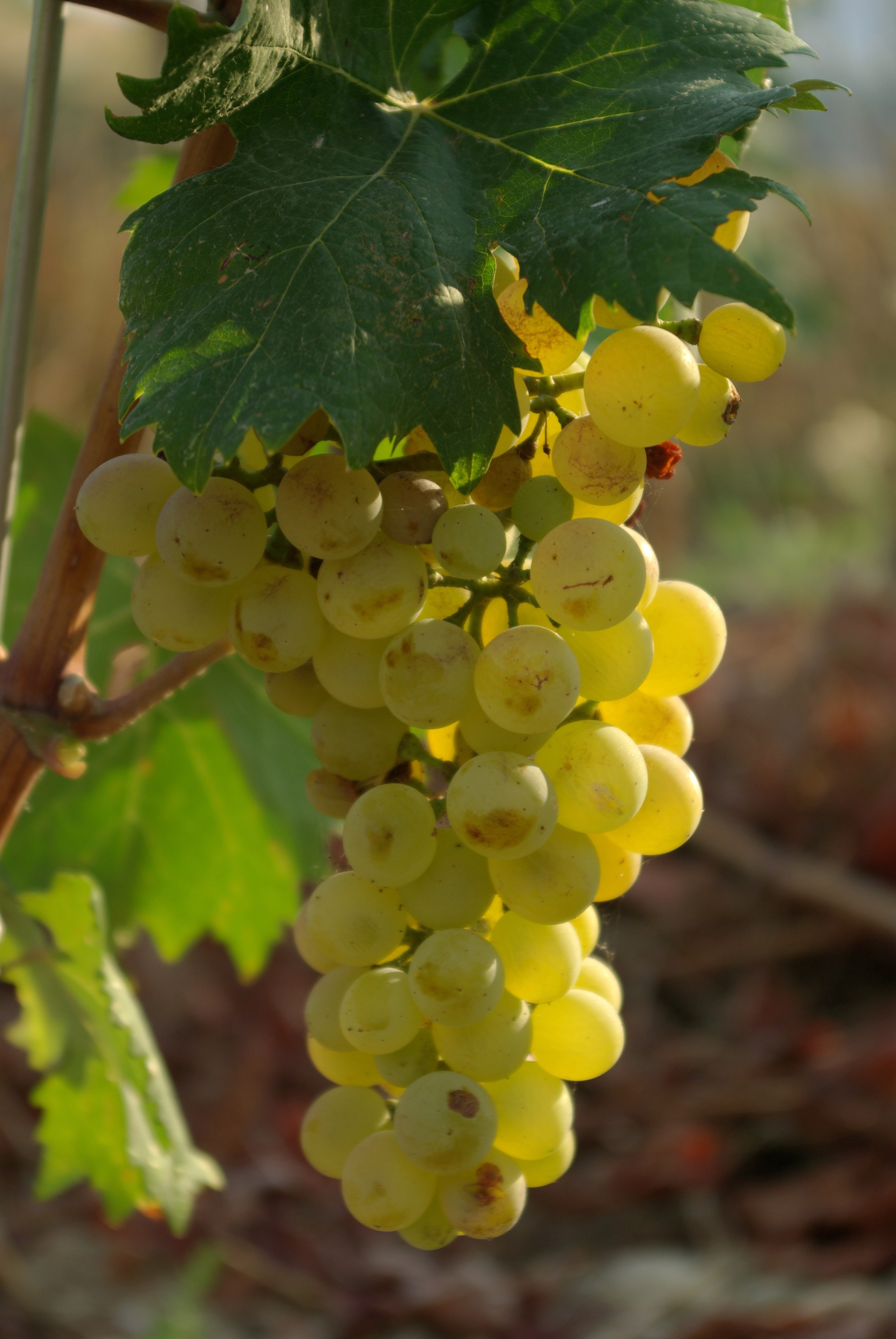
Vermentino, one of the grape varieties grown by the inmates and used to produce Gorgona.

The vineyard at the Gorgona Agricultural Penal Colony was first planted in 1999 but was soon abandoned, only to be revived 10 years later by an inmate of the penal colony who had a family vineyard in Sicily and wanted to restore the Gorgona vineyards. In 2012, Italian prison authorities inquired with various Italian wineries about partnering with the penal colony to produce wine. Lamberto Frescobaldi, the current Marchesi de'Frescobaldi and 30th generation of the Tuscan winemaking family, saw potential in an east-facing 1 ha (2.5 acres) plot of land on the island's mineral-rich vineyard soils, and decided to purchase the land. The Frescobaldis contracted with the penal colony to work the vineyard, providing training and expertise to inmates, and paying them a wage in exchange for the rights to sell the wine produced on the island.

The wine produced at the penal colony is certified under the Denominazione di origine controllata classification and is labelled as Frescobaldi per Gorgona (or simply Gorgona), which Frescobaldi says will retail for ~€60-70 a bottle and be featured on the wine lists of several Italian restaurants including a Michelin Guide 3-star rated restaurant in Florence. The wine is a blend of Ansonica and Vermentino.

Frescobaldi has stated that any profits made from the joint venture will be re-invested back into the penal colony and the winery is open to hiring former inmates for their other winery operations once they have been released. Plans are underway to expand vineyard plantings on the islands and to increase the house-capacity of the penal colony to 136 prisoners.

== Notable inmates ==
- Benedetto Ceraulo, Sicilian hitman who was hired by Patrizia Reggiani to murder her husband Maurizio Gucci, of the Gucci fashion family.
