= Glass sea creatures =

19th-century models

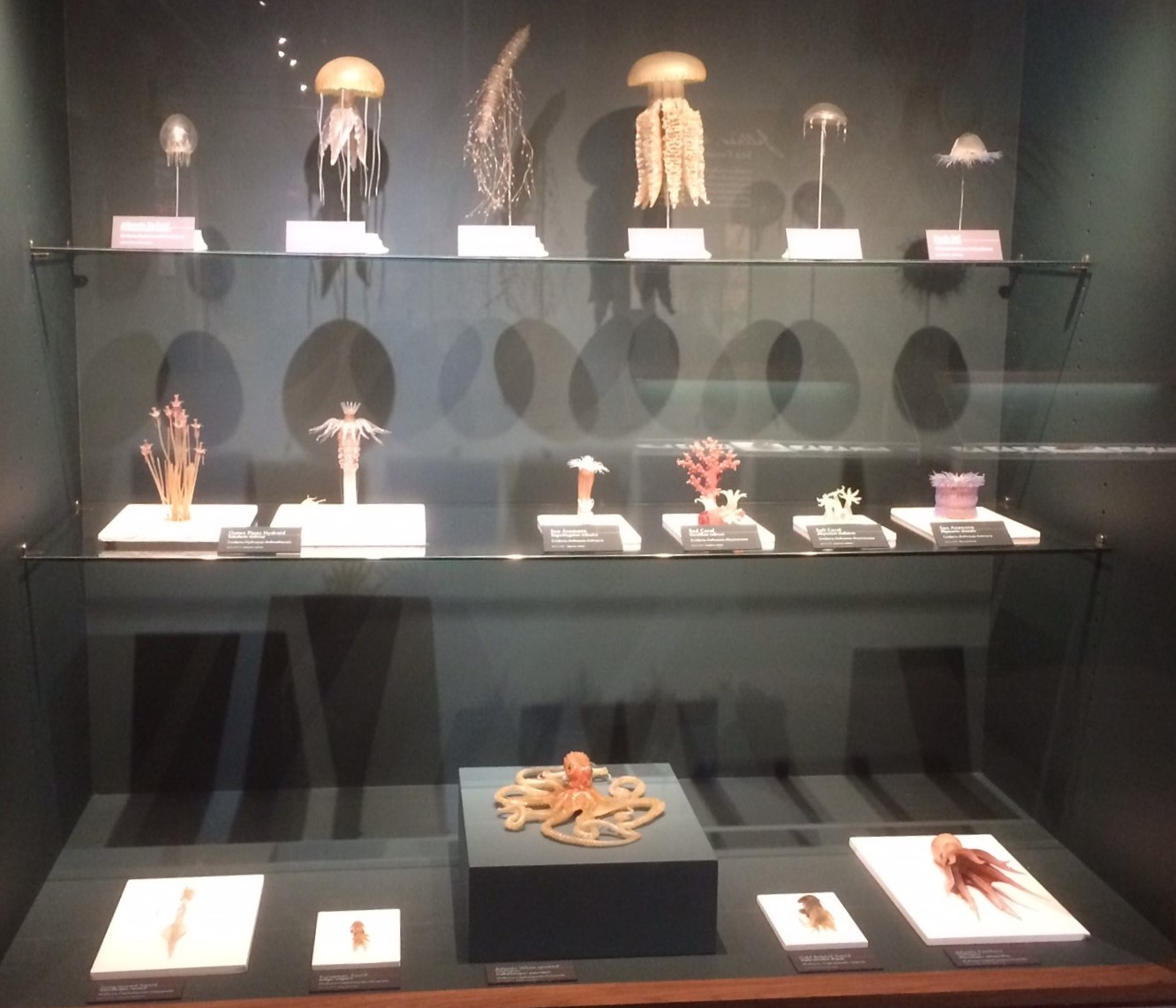
A sample of the Blaschka invertebrate models

The glass sea creatures (alternately called the Blaschka sea creatures, glass marine invertebrates, Blaschka invertebrate models, and Blaschka glass invertebrates) are works of glass artists Leopold and Rudolf Blaschka. The artistic predecessors of the Glass Flowers, the sea creatures were the output of the Blaschkas' successful mail-order business of supplying museums and private collectors around the world with sets of glass models of marine invertebrates.

Between 1863 and 1880, the Blaschkas – working in Dresden – executed at least 10,000 of these highly detailed glass models, representing some 700 different species.

A number of large collections of the models are held by museums and other academic institutions. Harvard's Museum of Natural History exhibits many of the Blaschka's glass creations, and its Museum of Comparative Zoology hold 430 items in the Blaschka Glass Invertebrate Collection and display about 60 at any given time. Cornell University has about 570 items in its collection and has restored some 170 of these, with many others in its collection stored at the Corning Museum of Glass in Corning, New York. The largest collection in Europe, of 530 pieces, is at Ireland's Natural History Museum. Other holdings include the Boston Museum of Science; the Field Museum of Natural History in Chicago, Natural History Museum in London, Redpath Museum of McGill University in Montreal, Natural History Museum in Geneva, and both Trinity College Dublin and University College Dublin in Ireland; Hancock Museum in Newcastle upon Tyne, England; University Museum in Utrecht, The Grant Museum of Zoology in London, and Aquarium-Museum in Liège, Belgium, the Canterbury Museum, Christchurch in New Zealand and Melbourne Museum, in Melbourne, Australia.

== Inspiration ==
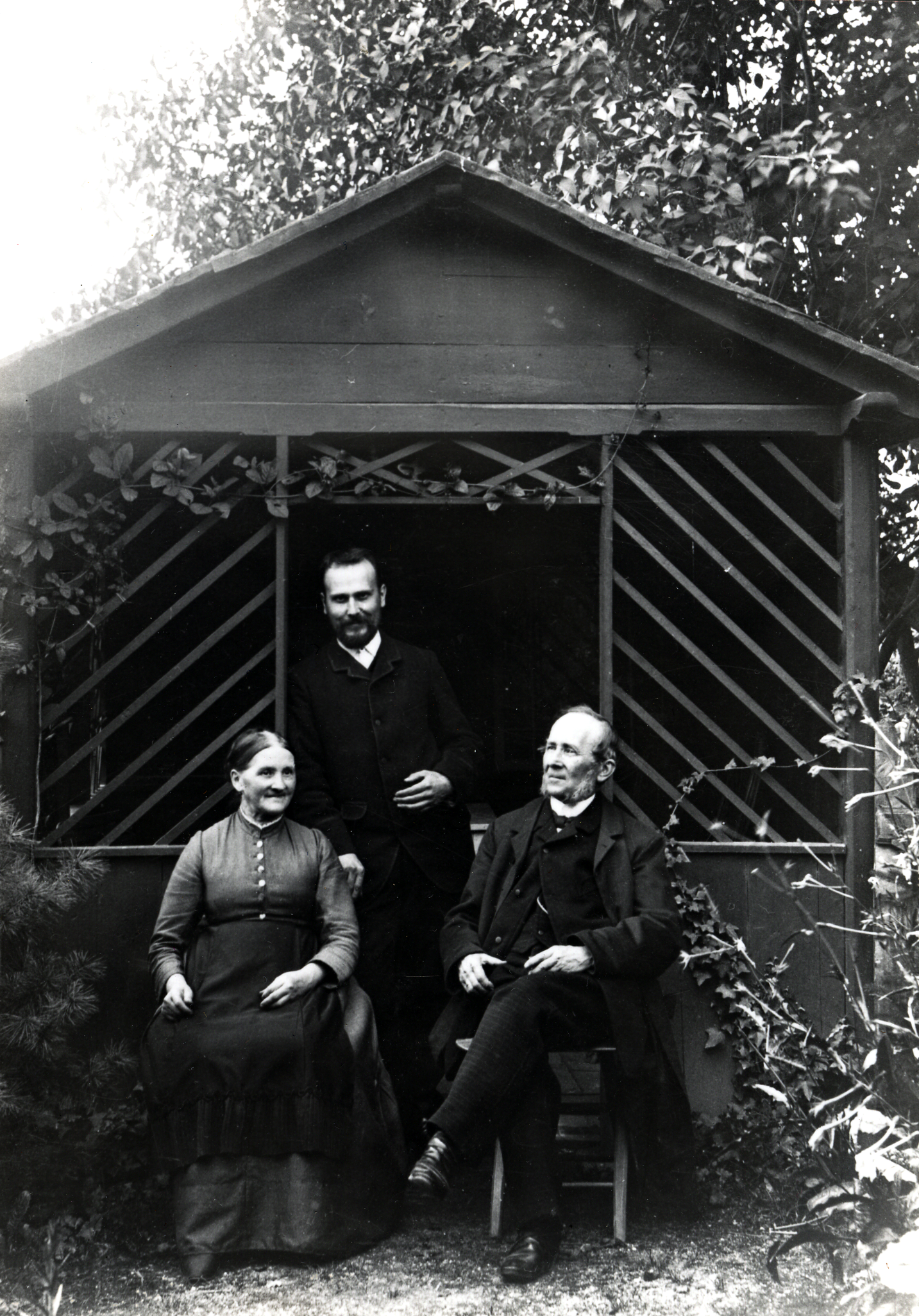
Rudolf (standing), Caroline, and Leopold Blaschka in the garden of their Dresden home

In 1853, shortly after the death of his father and wife Caroline, the latter to a cholera epidemic, Leopold Blaschka – grief stricken and in need of a vacation – traveled to the United States. En route the ship was becalmed and lay still upon the sea for two weeks. During this period of forced idleness, Leopold studied and sketched the local marine invertebrate population, intrigued by the transparency of their bodies similar to the glass his family had long worked.

Leopold felt a sense of quiet, inspirational, wonder at these luminescent ocean dwellers, a sense which he recorded and translated by Henri Reiling: "It is a beautiful night in May. Hopeful, we look out over the darkness of the sea, which is as smooth as a mirror; there emerges all around in various places a flashlike bundle of light beams, as if it is surrounded by thousands of sparks, that form true bundles of fire and of other bright lighting spots, and the seemingly mirrored stars. There emerges close before us a small spot in a sharp greenish light, which becomes ever larger and larger and finally becomes a bright shining sunlike figure."

This sense of wonder would fuel his later work but, in the meantime and upon his return to Dresden, Leopold focused on his family business which was the production of the glass eyes, costume ornaments, lab equipment, and other such fancy goods and specialty items; plus the task of training of his son and apprentice (who was his eventual successor), Rudolf Blaschka.

== Reichenbach's request ==
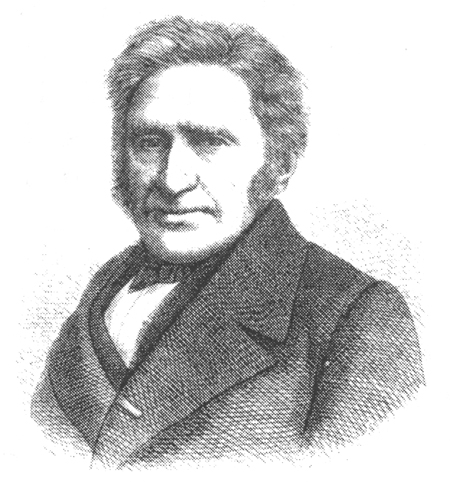
Heinrich Gottlieb Ludwig Reichenbach

Director of the natural history museum in Dresden, Prof. Reichenbach was faced with an annoying yet seemingly unsolvable problem in regards to showing marine life. Land-based flora and fauna was not an issue, for it was a relatively simple matter to exhibit mounted and stuffed creatures such as gorillas and elephants, their lifelike poses attracting and exciting the museum's visitors. Invertebrates, however, by their very nature, posed a problem. In the 19th century the only practiced method of showcasing them was to take a live specimen and place it in a sealed jar of alcohol. This of course killed it but, more importantly, time and their lack of hard parts eventually rendered them into little more than colorless floating blobs of jelly. Neither pretty nor a terribly effective teaching tool, Prof. Reichenbach wanted something more, specifically 3D colored models of marine invertebrates that were both lifelike and able to stand the test of time. By coincidence, in 1863, he "saw an exhibition of highly detailed, realistic glass flowers created by a Bohemian lampworker named Leopold Blaschka."

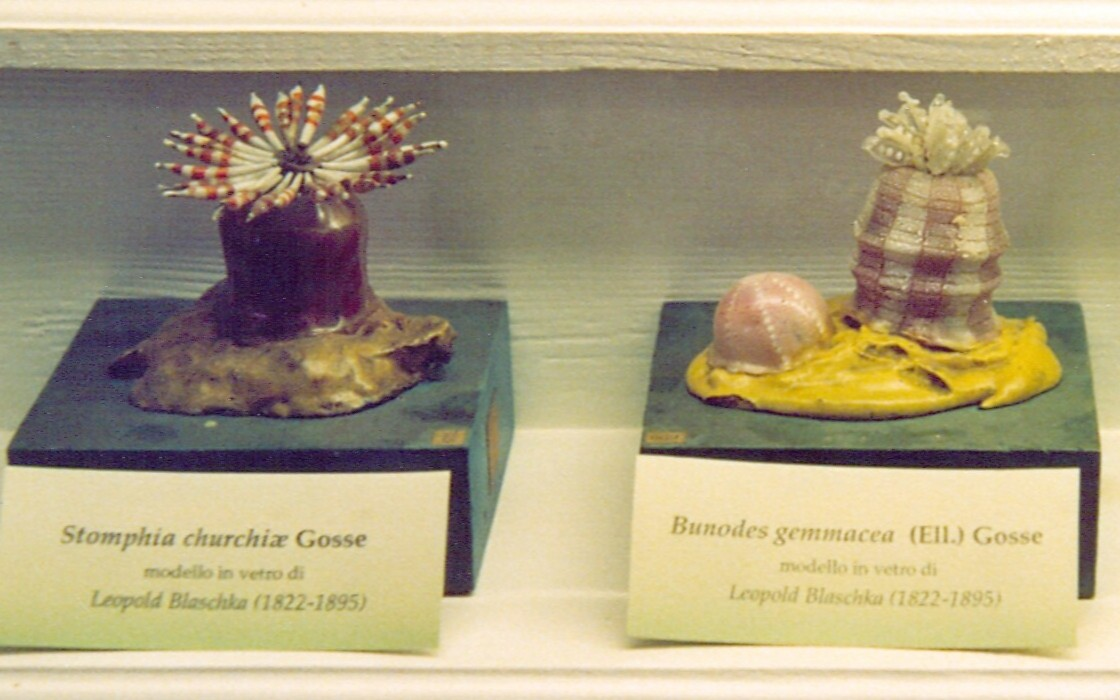
Blaschka model of sea anemones

Enchanted by the botanical models, and positive that Leopold held the key to ending his own showcasing issue, in 1863 Reichenbach convinced and commissioned Leopold to produce twelve model sea anemones. These marine models, hailed as "an artistic marvel in the field of science and a scientific marvel in the field of art", were a great improvement on previous methods of presenting such creatures: drawings, pressing, photographs and papier-mâché or wax models. and exactly what Prof. Reichenbach needed. Moreover they, at last, provided an outlet for the wonder Leopold had felt all those years ago when observing the phosphorescent ocean life.

The key fact, though, was that these glass marine models were, as would soon be acknowledged, "perfectly true to nature", and as such represented an opportunity both for the scientific community and the Blaschkas themselves (to create sea anemone images faithful to nature, images from P.H. Gosse's Actinologia Britannica, 1860, were utilised). Knowing this, and thrilled with his newly acquired set of glass sea creatures, Reichenbach advised Leopold to drop his current and generations long family business of glass fancy goods and the like in favor of selling glass marine invertebrates to museums, aquaria, universities, and private collectors. Advice which would prove wise and fateful both economically and scientifically, for Leopold did as the Dresden natural history museum director suggested.

== A successful business ==
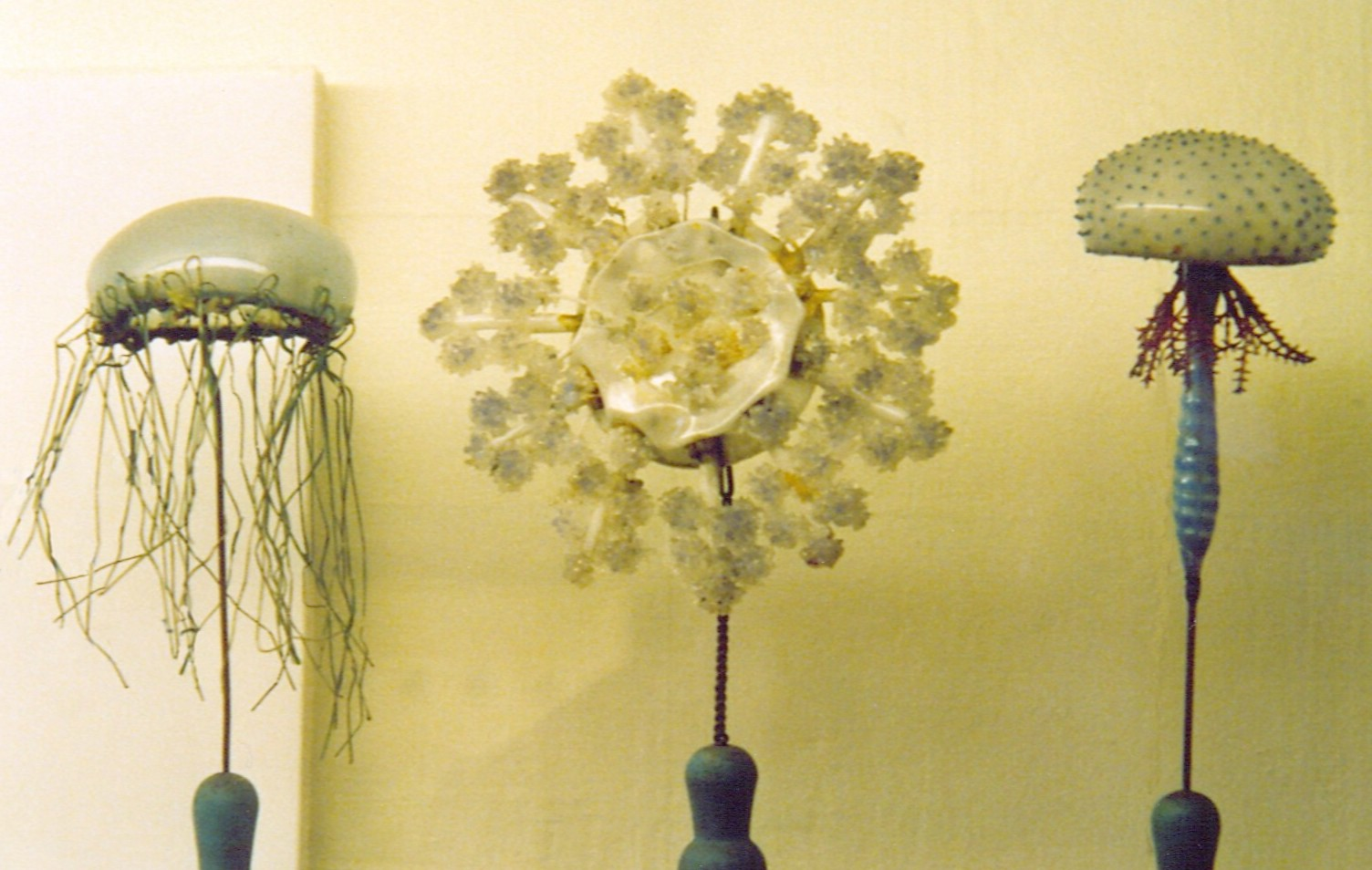
Blaschka model of jellyfish

Unlike the Glass Flower, which began as a private commission to a single University's museum, the Blaschka glass sea creatures were a global enterprise. They reflected a change in attitude: "as popular interest in the history and sciences of the natural world burgeoned during the latter half of the 19th century, the sea became particularly alluring. The spread of home aquariums and the advent of deep-sea diving revealed a new frontier, filled with wondrous and unusual creatures." During this time of interest in the natural world, it became a sign of culture and sophistication to exhibit examples of life in one's drawing rooms and parlors. The Blaschkas, aware of public and museum demand, created a mail-order business. They sold 10,000 glass invertebrates globally. It is said that "the world had never seen anything quite like the beautiful, scientifically accurate Blaschka models." Yet they were available via mail-order, through a local card catalog. Ward's Natural Science sold a small glass octopus for approximately $2.50. Museums and universities displayed them much as Prof. Reichenbach had because natural history museums had a problem showcasing marine invertebrates. The mail-order enterprise succeeded for two reasons: 1- there was substantial global demand; 2- they were the glass artists most capable of crafting accurate models. Initially the designs for these were based on drawings in books, but Leopold was soon able to use his earlier drawings to produce highly detailed models of other species, and his reputation quickly spread.

As Leopold wrote in an English-language trade catalog preserved at the Rakow Research Library at The Corning Museum of Glass: "[Models of invertebrate animals] have been purchased by... museums and scholastic establishments in all the quarters of the globe... in New Zealand... in Tokio [sic], Japan... for the Indian Museum in Calcutta... in the United States of America by Professor Ward's Natural Science Establishment in Rochester, New York; for the Museum of Comparative Zoology in Cambridge, Massachusetts; for the Boston Society of Natural History; the University of Cornell; the Wellesley Female College... In Great Britain, Scotland and Ireland, copies have been conveyed to London, Edinburgh and Dublin... In Austria, orders have not only been made for the Imperial Royal Court collection, but also for the universities in Innsbruck, Graz, Czernovitz, and so forth. In Germany, purchases have been made for the universities of Berlin, Bonn, Koenigsberg, Jena, Leipzig, Rostock and many other museums."

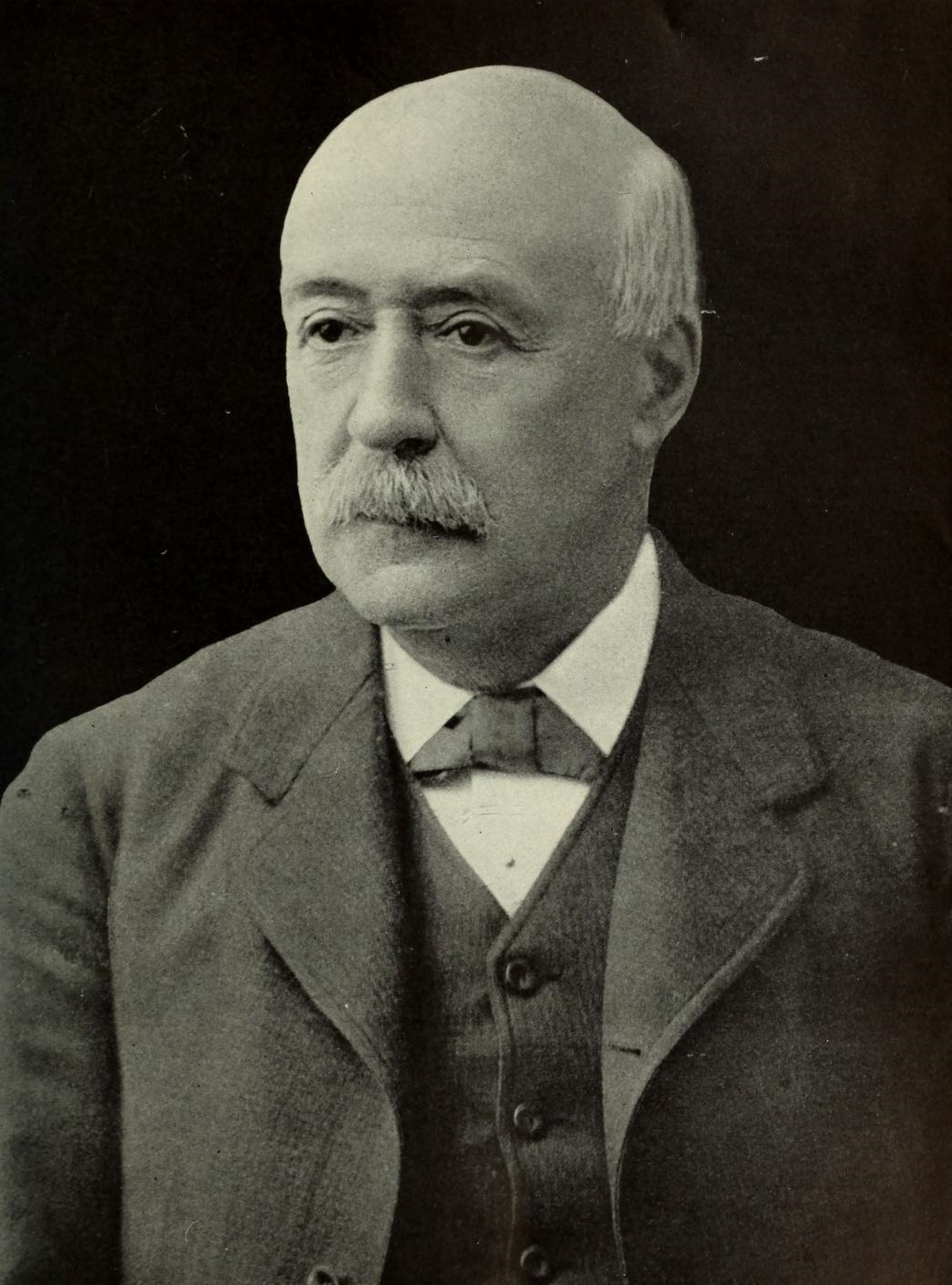
Alexander Agassiz

Leopold gradually extended his range of work by studying marine animals from the North Sea, Baltic Sea and Mediterranean, and later constructed an aquarium at his house, in order to keep live specimens from which to model.

Yet the fate of the marine invertebrate mail-order business was ultimately to be tied to those bought by Harvard's Museum of Comparative Zoology. At some time after the museum's founding in 1859, a collection of 430 glass sea creatures were purchased by either Louis Agassiz, the first director, or his son and successor Alexander Agassiz. and was likely at least partially unpacked by Alexander Agassiz's personal secretary Elizabeth Hodges Clark, one of the first and few women with any authority in the museum. This set was not the largest ever sold and the models were no different from any of the others made by the Blaschkas, but their effect was to be greater than all the rest combined.

== From invertebrates to flowers ==
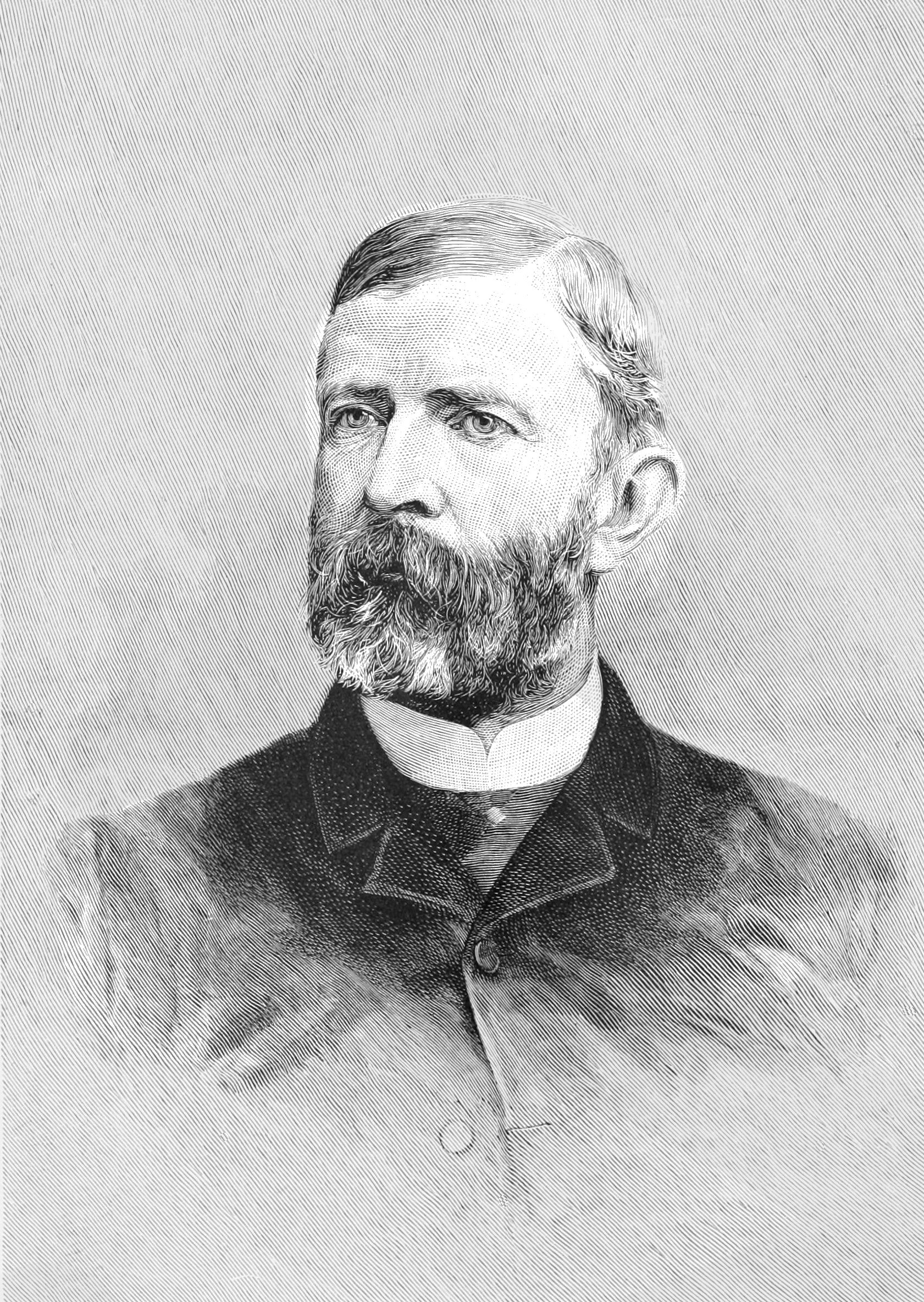
George Lincoln Goodale

Paradoxically and in historically circular twist, the reason that the glass sea creatures sold to Harvard were to prove so crucial was because the University would soon, and did, open its new Botanical Museum in 1888. Given in effect a series of empty rooms and invited to make a museum for teaching botany, the first director, George Lincoln Goodale, faced a familiar problem. At that time, Harvard was the global center of botanical study and, as such, Prof. Goodale wanted the best for his students, but the only used method was showcasing pressed and carefully labeled botanical specimens – a methodology that offered a twofold problem: being pressed, the specimens were two-dimensional and tended to lose their color. Hence they were hardly the ideal teaching tools. In fact, Goodale's problem was essentially the same as Reichenbach's had been, but applied to botany rather than marine biology for, in both cases, the practiced method of exhibition robbed the specimens of color and three-dimensional form.

A glass model of a cactus at the Harvard Museum of Natural History Glass Flowers collection

Moreover and also like Prof. Reichenbach, Prof. Goodale first learned of Leopold and Rudolf Blaschkas' skill per an exhibition – that being the glass marine invertebrates belonging to the Museum of Comparative Zoology. And, like Reichenbach, upon seeing the Blaschkas' work Goodale was instantly sure that they held the answer to his showcasing problem. Thus, in yet another direct historical parallel, in 1886 the Blaschkas were approached by Goodale for the sole purpose of finding them, with a request to make a series of glass botanical models for Harvard. Naturally Leopold was initially unwilling as, again, his current business of selling glass marine invertebrates was booming; but, eventually, the famed glass artists agreed to send test-models to the U.S. and, although damaged in customs, the fragments convinced Goodale that Blaschka glass art was a more than worthy educational investment. Thus, with the generous sponsorship of Elizabeth C. Ware and her daughter Mary, the initial contract was signed and dictated that the Blaschkas need only work half-time on the models, thus allowing them to continue their production of the Glass sea creatures. However, in 1890, they and Goodale – acting on behalf of the Wares – signed an updated version that allowed Leopold and Rudolf to work on them (the Glass Flowers) full-time; though some sources describe the agreement as a shift from a 3-year contract to a 10-year one. Regardless, the production and time of the Glass sea creatures was over, their fame as well as the attention of their makers shifting to the Glass Flowers – a project that, fifty years later, ended with the death of Rudolf Blaschka (Leopold having died thirty-nine years earlier).

== The models today ==
=== Corning ===
With a collection 700 models bought in 1888, the Corning Museum of Glass boasts the largest known collection of Blaschka sea creatures. Displayed (at least in part) in an exhibition named Fragile Legacy, "researchers at Cornell are using the collection as a time capsule for seeking out and documenting the creatures still living in our oceans today." Corning's exhibit also allows visitors to try crafting glass sea slugs as well as view subsequent works inspired by the Blaschkas. The exhibit was open through January 8, 2017. The Corning Museum of Glass produced a film entitled Fragile Legacy exploring the related topics of the Glass sea creatures and the living ones they represent.

=== Harvard ===
Front view of Harvard's temporary renovation exhibit

Even those specimens purchased by Harvard's Museum of Comparative Zoology (MCZ) suffered a degree of neglect; they were not forgotten, but they were scattered much as the quote above describes, across several departments, and it was believed that the University only possessed 60–70 models (rather than the actual 430). Recently Harvard has restored and, to best of their abilities, repaired the Glass sea creatures with the hired and instrumental help of Preservation Specialist and Glass Worker Elizabeth R. Brill of Corning, New York, a marine biologist and daughter of a glass chemist. (Brill later co-authored a book about the Glass sea creatures.) Today they form the Harvard Museum of Natural History Sea Creatures in Glass display which, when combined with the Glass Flowers, form the largest Blaschka collection on display in the world.

==== Harvard's renovation exhibit ====
For a several month period beginning in 2015 and ending in the early summer of 2016, the HMNH set up a "temporary display highlighting twenty-seven of the most popular plant models as well as some items from the Blaschka archives" while the main Glass Flowers exhibit was under renovation. This exhibit was unique because it was the first recorded time that the Glass Flowers have been jointly exhibited with the Glass sea creatures in a major and equal display. The renovation exhibit was dismantled when, on May 21, 2016, the main Glass Flowers exhibit reopened. The Glass sea creatures remained as a permanent exhibit in the same location until 2020, when they were relocated into a nearby room and exhibit of their own.

=== Cornell ===
In 1885 Andrew Dixon White, first president of Cornell University, authorized purchase of 570 glass marine invertebrates, "some of which are on exhibit at Corson Mudd Hall and the Herbert F. Johnson Museum, making Cornell one of the few universities in the world where students and the public can view these wondrous creations." However and like so many of their counterpart collections, they were neglected after a time and, in this case, remained forgotten under dust and grit until the latter half of the 20th century. Currently Cornell has restored approximately 170 of the models thus far and "restoration work will continue as funding allows."

=== National Museum of Ireland ===
The Natural History Museum branch of the National Museum of Ireland in Dublin was among the Blaschkas' "earliest customers and initially commissioned 85 glass models, paying the then significant sum of £15. It went on to purchase 530 models from the Blaschkas" – making it the largest collection of Blaschka Invertebrate Models in Europe Since then, the Dead Zoo, as Ireland's Natural History Museum is sometimes called, "has undertaken research on the conservation of these delicate objects." Noteworthy in that, like Corning, they have forever taken excellent care of the Sea Creatures, the National Museum of Ireland is another center of learning regarding the Blaschkas; a fact proven in that, in 2006, they hosted (alongside University College Dublin) the Dublin Blaschka Congress, "conceived as a gathering to bring together the diverse scholarly disciplines that are uniquely, if eccentrically, joined in the study of scientific glass models." Crucially and naturally, the Congress dealt with the Glass Flowers no less than their older maritime cousins.

=== University of Wisconsin–Madison ===
In 2007 the University of Wisconsin–Madison Zoological Museum accidentally uncovered their hitherto forgotten 50-model collection in a "series of keyholes under the exhibit cases along a first-floor corridor Curator Paula Holahan made the discovery, stating "It's not uncommon to find things packed away in any museum that is over 100 years old." The specimens, currently too brittle to be publicly displayed, remain in storage until conservation measures are funded and completed. These funds are not materializing, although the museum hopes to one willing to sponsor the restoration before the effects of age become irreversible.

=== Field Museum of Natural History ===
A number of glass models, including shells and sea slugs were displayed in the 1893 World's Columbian Exposition and were among the 2,947 series purchased by the museum from Ward's Natural Science Establishment. Many are on display in the What is an Animal? permanent exhibit.

=== Natural History Museum, London ===
The Natural History Museum, London holds 182 of the models.

=== Natural History Museum, Wollaton Hall, Nottingham, England ===
There is a large display of marine invertebrates and also two models of single cell animals living in fresh water.

=== Museum of Science (Boston) ===
The Museum of Science (MoS) has a small display of marine invertebrates towards the end of their Natural Mysteries exhibit.

=== D'Arcy Thompson Zoology Museum ===
The D'Arcy Thompson Zoology Museum at the University of Dundee in Scotland showcases the Blaschka models of marine invertebrates which its founder, Scottish biologist and mathematician D'Arcy Thompson acquired in 1888 to use as teaching aids. In his 1917 book On Growth and Form, Thompson compares the forms of various marine invertebrates to the shapes made by glass-blowers, suggesting a link to these models.

=== University of Vienna ===
The University of Vienna has a collection of 145 glass marine invertebrates, "the second largest collection of Blaschka models in the German-speaking part of Europe after the Kremsmünster Abbey. The collection was used in teaching until the 1930s and was rediscovered only in the 1980s." In 2016 the collection was loaned to and put on display at the Naturhistorisches Museum Wien.

=== Natural History Museum of the University of Pisa ===
The Natural History Museum of the University of Pisa hosts one of the few glass marine invertebrates model in Italy. "Consisting of 51 marine invertebrates reproduction created for didactical purposes and probably belonging to the first phase of Blaschka's production (1822 – 1895)."

== Lost works ==
Many of the Glass sea creatures are yet to be located; Leopold's record books tell where many of the shipments went, yet the condition and current whereabouts of the majority of these collections remains unknown. The original six glass sea anemones purchased by Reichenbach in 1863 as well as the rest of that first collection were destroyed in the bombing of Dresden in World War II.

== See also ==
- Lampworking
- Glassblowing
