= Elizabeth Hodges Clark =

American museum assistant, secretary and scientific illustrator

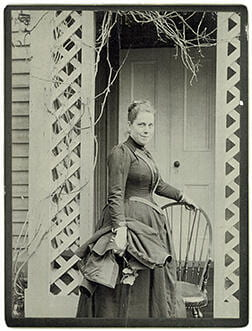
Elizabeth Hodges Clark

Elizabeth Hodges Clark (May 15, 1855 – 1932) was an American museum assistant, secretary and scientific illustrator employed by the Harvard's Museum of Comparative Zoology (MCZ) from 1873 to at least 1910. As an assistant, Clark categorized marine specimens and, later, accepted a promotion to become the personal secretary to museum director (and son of the founding director Louis) Alexander Agassiz, a job which left Clark in charge of the day-to-day management of the MCZ when the younger Agassiz was afield.

== Learning on the job ==
Miss Clark's career began when, at age eighteen and without any previous scientific credentials, she was offered and accepted a job at the MCZ sorting marine specimens under the supervision of naturalist Theodore Lyman. "Clark’s great-niece Elizabeth Hodges Clark Beeuwkes would later recall her great aunt’s descriptions of the “long counters on which the slimy specimens lay” in the museum" and that a senior museum assistant named Elizabeth Lyell Anthony, a fifty-year MCZ veteran, would stand over the younger Elizabeth saying, “Do not take off your apron before the bell rings” and “Do not let Mr. Lyman see you sitting down.” At this time museum hierarchy related to gender as well as skill, hence Lyman, a man, set the agenda for his female subordinates. Yet this did not mean that the women never touched anything objects of great significance, for it is believed that Clark very likely helped unpack and inspect the Blaschka glass invertebrates and, possibly, later their younger botanical cousins, the more famous Glass Flowers.

== Alexander Agassiz's right hand ==
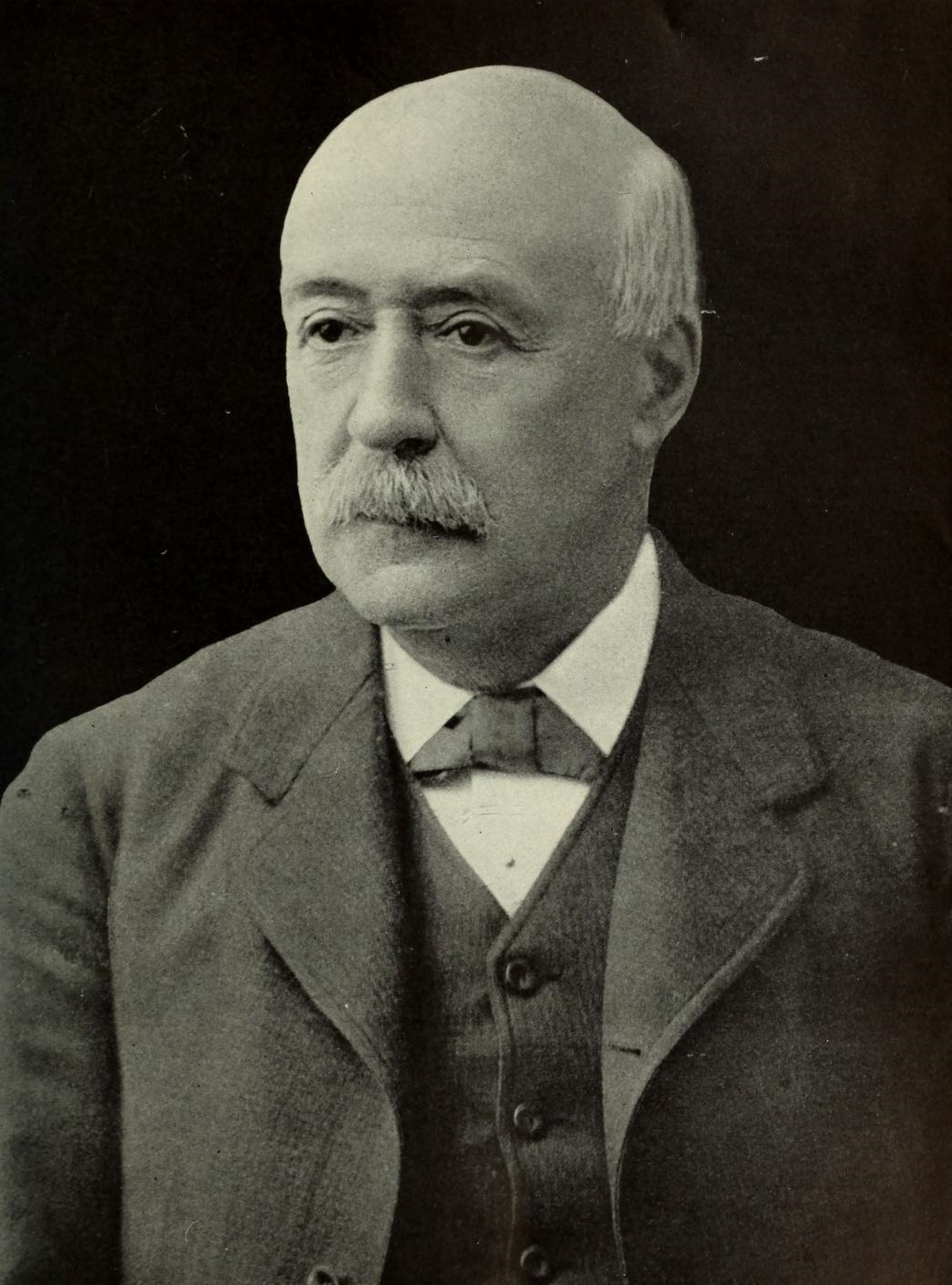
Portrait of Alexander Agassiz

After almost a decade on the job, in 1880, and in testament to her skill, Elizabeth Hodges Clark accepted a promotion as MCZ director Alexander Agassiz's personal secretary. How the relationship between her and Mr. Agassiz began is unknown, but "over time Agassiz would delegate to her more and more of his professional responsibilities. She managed his correspondence, made administrative decisions during his long absences and proofread his scientific publications." For example, in 1891 when Agassiz was abroad, the MCZ ornithologist William Brewster wrote to secretary Clark asking whether valuable museum specimens should be lent, saying "I should hardly venture without your emphatic approval to lend a type and other valuable specimens on such a long journey." Thus, despite the traditionally limited roles women were permitted to play in museums at large at the time, Elizabeth Hodges Clark thoroughly broke that mold in the MCZ to the point that she was Alexander Agassiz's right hand in all professional respects, her close working relationship with him, as detailed by their extensive and since archived correspondences, based upon long friendship and mutual respect. Nor was the exchange of letters limited to Agassiz for, being de facto head of the MCZ in his absence, Miss Clark wrote regularly to the aforementioned William Brewster, who in 1885 was made museum's curator of mammals and birds.

Evidence of this respect was made clear beyond the written word when, in the late 1890s, Agassiz offered to furnish a home for her in Newport, Rhode Island where he lived so that she would be on hand during the summer months. She had already "in a somewhat unusual arrangement ... spent her summers installed in the tower room of Agassiz’s summer home in Newport, Rhode Island correcting proofs of his publications", though it is unknown if she ever accepted decided to accept his offer. What is known, however, is that Elizabeth Hodges Clark's employment at the MCZ ended when her friend and boss's life did in 1910. Dying aboard the RMS Adriatic en route to New York from Southampton, Alexander Agassiz designated in his will a sizable amount to his right-hand woman; as noted by the New York Times, "Miss Elizabeth H. Clarke of Cambridge, Mass., secretary of Prof. Agassiz receives $25,000 outright, and $5,000 a year for life." This sum was more than twice that bequeathed to Agassiz's two long-term male servants, yet said sum was misreported by half. In reality and as later revealed, Clark's additional annuity was $10,000, more than five times the amount Agassiz bequeathed to his daughter-in-law.

== Personal life ==
Elizabeth Hodges Clark's private affairs are largely unknown, yet, per census records and despite ignorance regarding her exact salary, it is known that her key position at Harvard allowed her to become her family's breadwinner, supporting her widowed mother and the four children of her siblings, with enough extra to hire a pair of servants in her Garden Street home in Cambridge, MA. Furthermore, as a person she is described as one of unfailing intelligence and unswerving ability, with the American scientist Herbert Spencer Jennings (then a graduate student in zoology) writing home that, "Miss Clark is very bright and interesting...And as Mr. Agassiz’s secretary she has come in contact with many famous and interesting people, and is a most interesting talker." The money Agassiz left her in her will permitted the also described "very quiet and unassuming" Elizabeth Hodges Clark to "retire comfortably and, for the first time, to have her activities noted in the gossip pages of regional papers like the Boston Daily Globe."

== Legacy ==
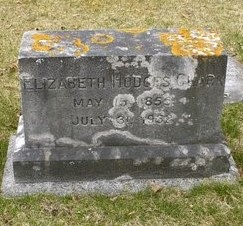
The grave of Elizabeth Hodges Clark at Ridgewood Cemetery

Despite her key role in the Harvard Museum of Comparative Zoology during one of its most important periods, Elizabeth Hodges Clark is largely absent from published records, a fact that can be partly owed to sexism, given that Agassiz's successor Samuel Henshaw barred her from returning to the museum. Only the archived records and letters reveal how crucial she was to the MCZ in its early days.
