= Mary Lee Ware =

American farmer and philanthropist

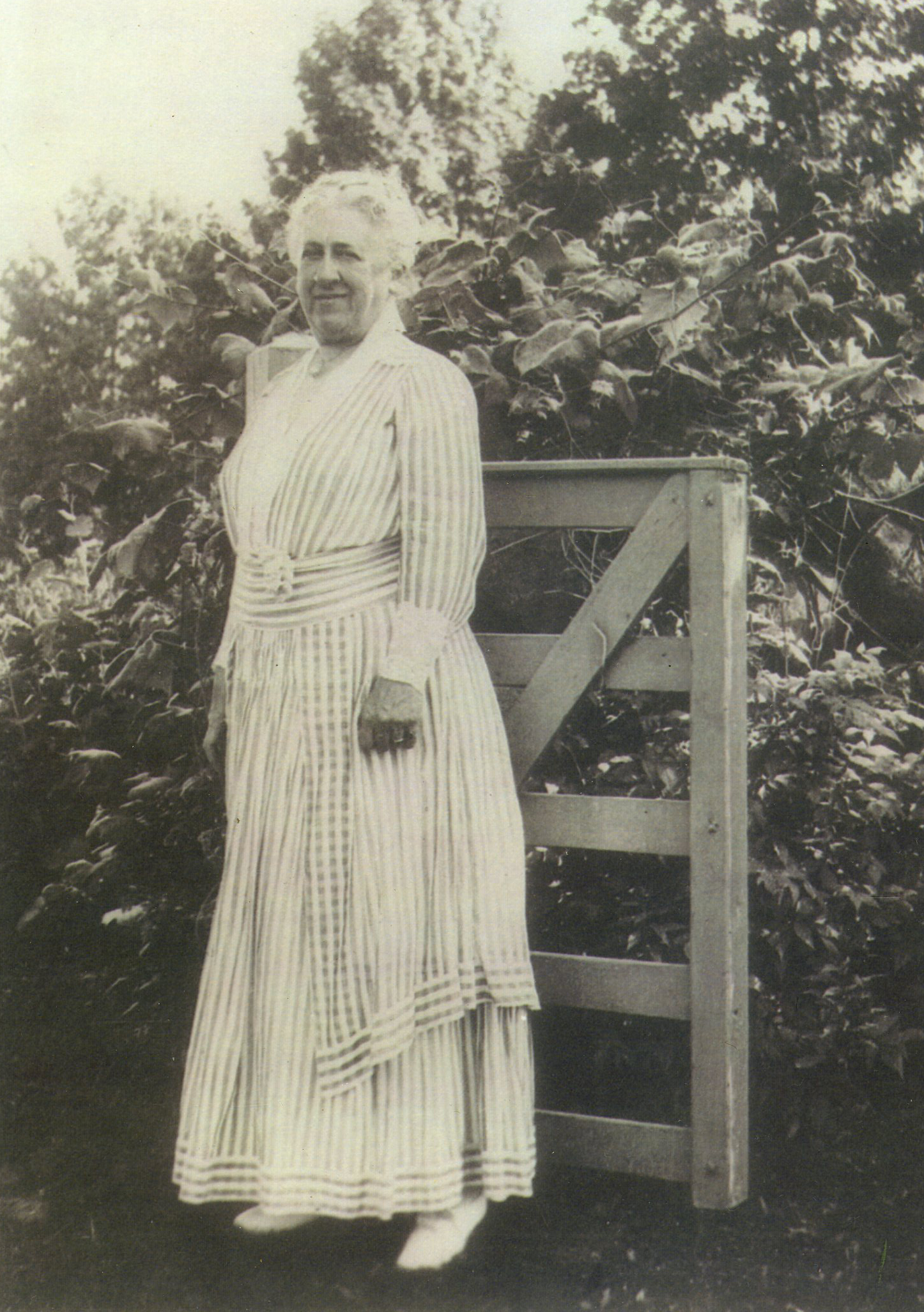
- Mary Lee Ware by farm gate
- Born: January 7, 1858
- Died: January 9, 1937 (aged 79); 41 Brimmer Street, Boston, Massachusetts
- Resting place: Mount Auburn Cemetery
- Education: Radcliffe College
- Occupations: Farmer, philanthropist
- Relatives: Elizabeth Cabot Lee (Mother), Charles Eliot Ware (Father), Francis Parkman (First Cousin)

Mary Lee Ware (Jan. 7, 1858 – Jan. 9, 1937), daughter of Elizabeth Cabot (Lee) Ware and Charles Eliot Ware, was born to a wealthy Bostonian family and, with her mother, was the principal sponsor of the Harvard Museum of Natural History's famous Glass Flowers (formally The Ware Collection of Blaschka Glass Models of Plants). She was an avid student of botany, particularly of the work of George Lincoln Goodale; a close friend and sponsor of Leopold and Rudolf Blaschka, creators of the Glass Flowers; and a leading philanthropist and farmer of Rindge, New Hampshire, and Boston, Massachusetts.

== Early life ==
Born into a respected family in the New Hampshire town of Rindge, specifically to naturalist and Harvard Medical School professor Dr. Charles Eliot Ware ("a leading physician in Boston") and his wife Elizabeth in 1858, Mary Lee Ware was an avid nature-lover and lived according to the precept "It is more blessed to give than to receive." Taken to Italy as a young girl, Mary was dazzled by the many sights (such as Rome and Florence) there, which served to enhance her love of beautiful things. Beauty that ranged from the picturesque landscape to the language which she quickly excelled, to the art for which the country is famous. This is no surprise given that her father, Dr. Charles Ware (Harvard class of 1834), while not a botanist himself raised his daughter to love botany with a passion. A love which was fostered by the family farm in Rindge New Hampshire, a place which stood out happily among her childhood memories. Mary eventually (exactly when is unclear given source ambiguity) settled with her parents in Boston, 41 Brimmer Street (Back Bay), around 1870; at that time, Mary was 13 years old. She was also, at some point, a student of Radcliffe College and learned under Dr. Goodale - who would become the first director of the Harvard Botanical Museum. In fact, "Mary Ware, an especially fascinating character, became in many respects a professional naturalist," a role which she was later able to utilize by being the patron sponsor of the Glass Flowers, her purpose being to advance the education of women.

== The Glass Flowers ==
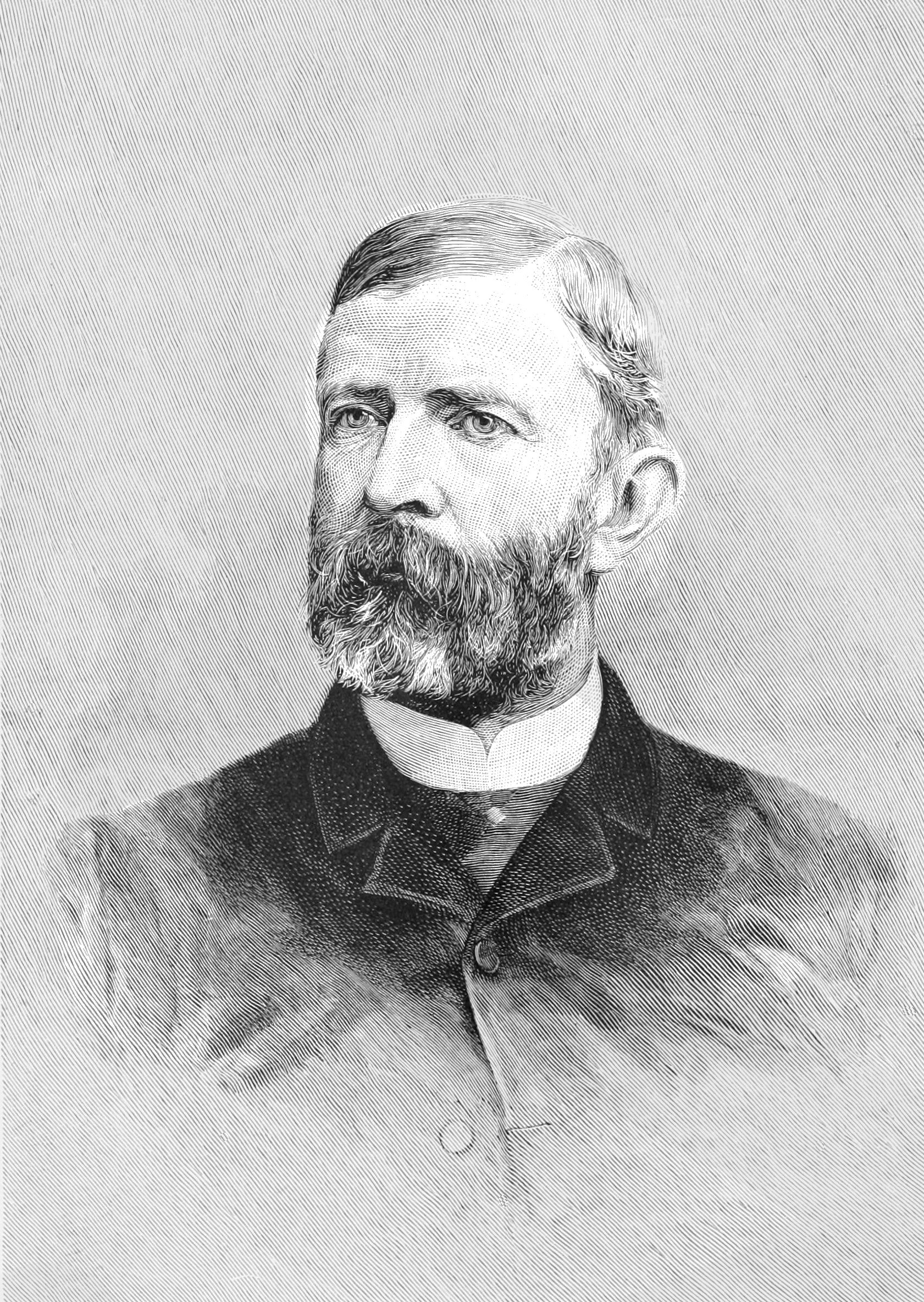
Professor George Lincoln Goodale

The "ever-loyal and ever-generous" Mary Lee Ware and her mother were drawn into the Glass Flowers enterprise in 1886 when her former teacher, Professor George Goodale, approached them with his idea to populate the new Botanical Museum (of which he was the first director) with Blaschka glass specimens. Being independently wealthy and (already) liberal benefactors of Harvard's botany department, Mary convinced her mother to agree to underwrite the 200 mark consignment, but this was done anonymously at first (and would remain so until 1888). The uncannily lifelike models arrived in the spring of 1887 and enchanted the Wares. Then, that same year, Dr. Charles Ware died, thus filling the two women with the desire to provide Harvard with a donation in his memory. Hence, when the official contract was signed between the Mary and her mother, Leopold and Rudolf, and Harvard, the agreement was that the collection would be a memorial to the now-deceased Doctor: "The first Blaschka glass flowers are formally presented to the Botanical Museum as a memorial to Dr. Charles Eliot Ware, Class of 1834, by his widow Elizabeth C. Ware and daughter Mary L. Ware." Today, there is a large bronze plaque in the exhibit's center formally dedicating it to the nature-loving Doctor, father, and husband. The initial contract signed dictated that the Blaschkas need only work half-time on the models, thus allowing them to continue their work making glass marine invertebrates. However, in 1890, they and Goodale - acting on behalf of the Wares - signed an updated version that allowed Leopold and Rudolf to work on them (the Glass Flowers) full-time; some sources detail the agreement as a shift from a 3-year contract to a 10-year one, agreed to once Goodale convinced Mary and her mother of the wisdom in doing so. It is also noted by Prof. Goodale in the Annual reports of the President and Treasurer of Harvard College 1890-1891 that the updated contract was partly due to the Blaschkas insisting that it was impossible to craft the botanical models for half the year and the marine ones the other half; "they said that they must give up either one or the other." Furthermore, the report notes that the activity of the Blaschka "has been greatly increased by their exclusive devotion to a single a single line of work." Later, in 1889, Leopold made and gifted a bouquet of glass flowers to the Wares which, at some later date, was given to Harvard and is now part of the Glass Flowers exhibit.

=== Specific role ===
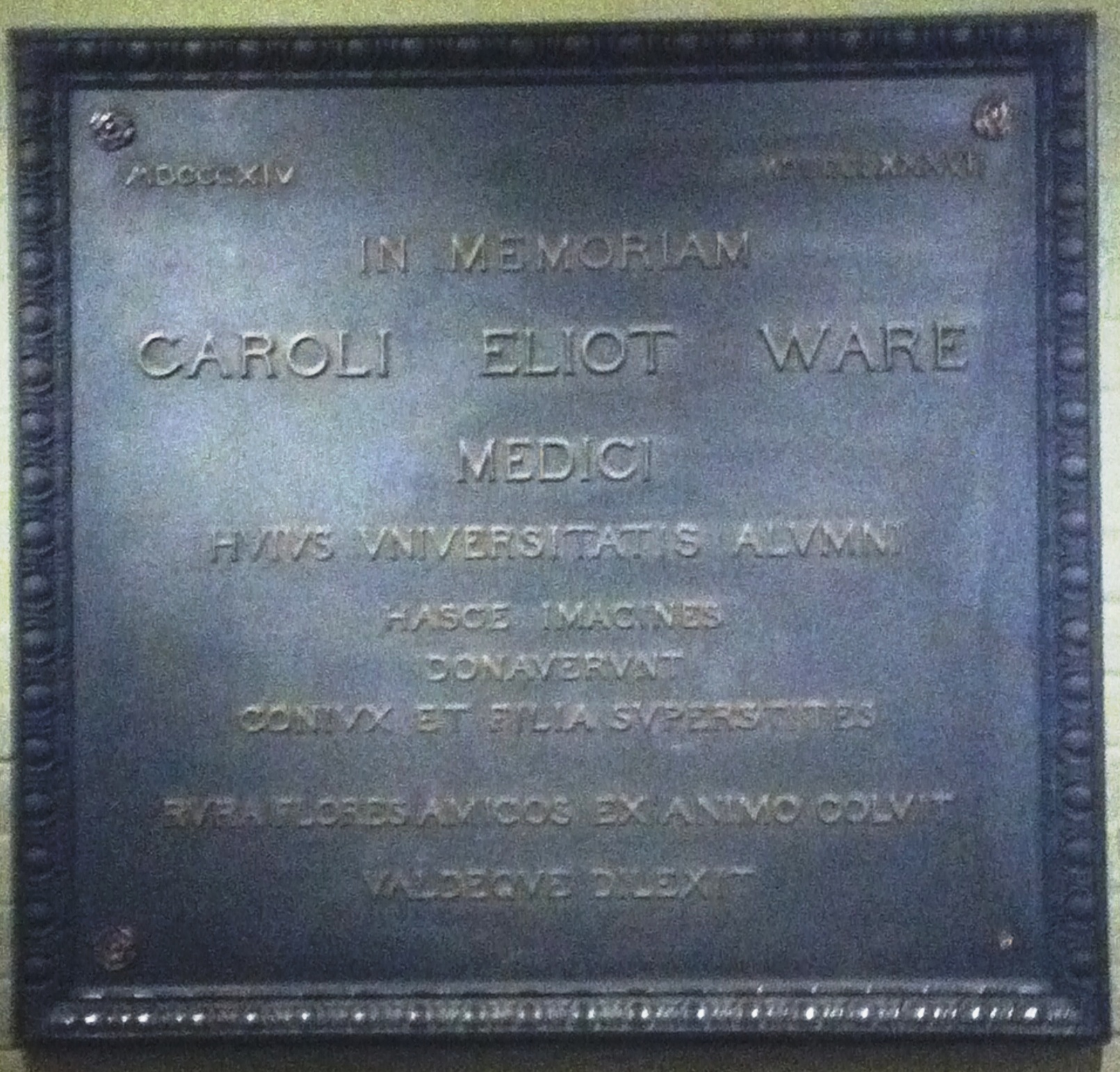
The plaque in the Harvard Museum of Natural History's Glass Flowers exhibit, formally dedicating it to Dr. Charles Eliot Ware.

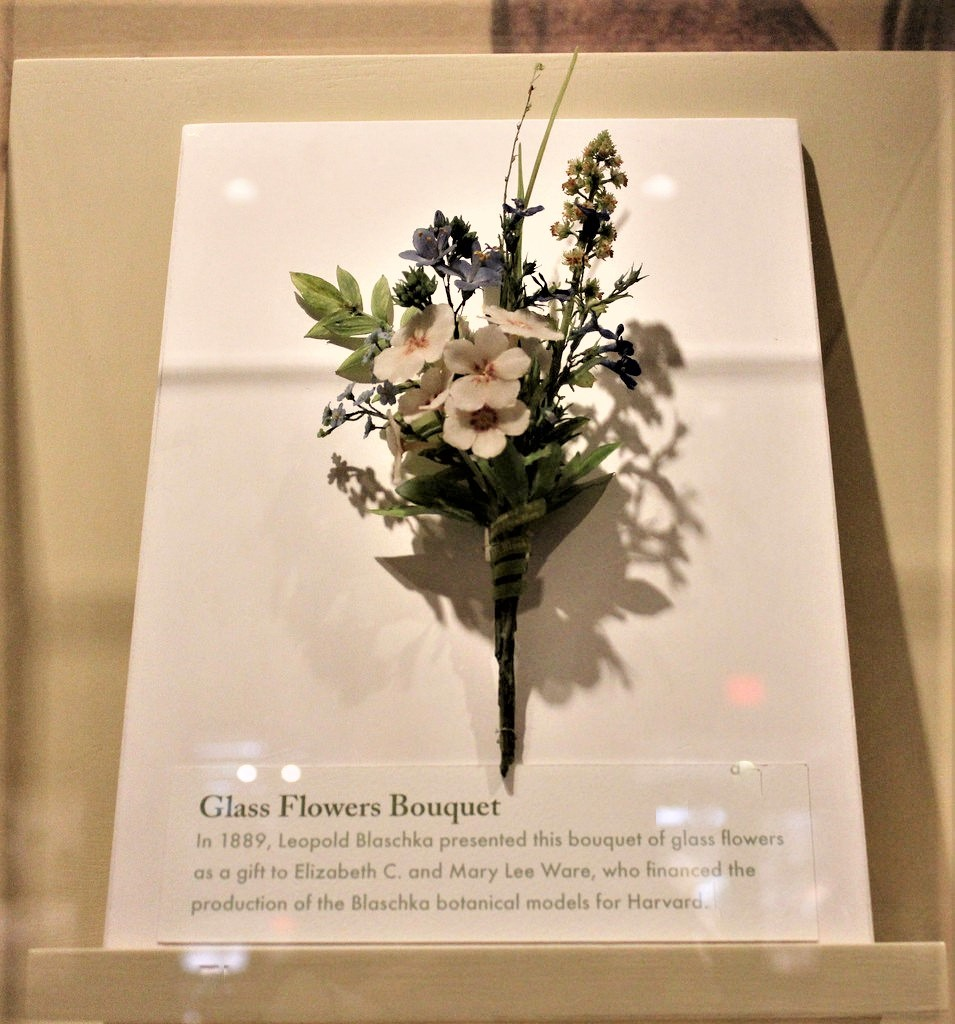
Glass Flowers gift-bouquet

Early in the making of the Glass Flowers, Mary Lee Ware engaged in correspondence with Professor Goodale regarding the making of the collection, one of which contained a remark of Leopold's regarding the false rumor that secret methods were used in the making of the Glass Flowers: "Many people think that we have some secret apparatus by which we can squeeze glass suddenly into these forms, but it is not so. We have tact. My son Rudolf has more than I have, because he is my son, and tact increases in every generation. The only way to become a glass modeler of skill, I have often said to people, is to get a good great-grandfather who loved glass." Miss Ware is also known to have visited the Blaschka home/studio three times, the first in 1899 along with Prof. Goodale, Mrs. Goodale and their son Francis. By this time Mary was the sole benefactress of the Blaschkas, as her mother, Elizabeth C. Ware, had died the previous year (1898). During the course of these visits she became very great friends with Rudolf and his wife Frieda, and, on one occasion, Rudolf wrote to Mary L. Ware regarding his vision of how the Flowers should be displayed: "I think pure white sheets will do best as bestow good light to the whole room. The models will look best either on pure white or a deep velvet-black." A preference Harvard evidently agreed with as, to this day, the botanical model are wired down to pure white boards within the original (albeit refurbished) cases. Regardless, Mary's second visit was around 1908 and the third on October 3, 1928. This second visit, made after Leopold's death, was years later related via a letter from Miss Ware to the second director of the Botanical Museum, Professor Oakes Ames. This letter appears to confirm the previous statement of Leopold's regarding his son; Miss Ware writes, "One change in the character of his work and, consequently in the time necessary to accomplish results since I was last here, is very noteworthy. At that time...he bought most of his glass and was just beginning to make some, and his finish was in paint. Now he himself makes a large part of the glass and all the enamels, which he powders to use as paint." This missive to Professor Ames was published on January 9, 1961, by the Harvard University Herbaria - Botanical Museum Leaflets, Harvard University Vol. 19, No. 6 - under the title "How Were The Glass Flowers Made?"

However, in September 1923 Miss Ware received a letter from Rudolf Blaschka stating that he has at long last shipped four cases of specimens to the Museum. This is the first Glass Flowers shipment following World War I, but the letter also notes the complicated tax and inflation situation in Germany has left him (Rudolf) without money - "I am at the end of my financial power" - and the Museum has not sent the 1923 payment yet. Presumably, Mary Lee Ware notified Professor Ames of this as, that November, $500 was sent to Rudolf via the now dead Prof. Goodale's son Francis. Furthermore and in addition to funding and visiting, Mary took a fairly active role in the project's progress, going so far as to personally unpack each model and making arrangements for Rudolph's fieldwork in the U.S. and Jamaica – the purpose of such trips being to gather and study various plant specimens before returning to the old style Bohemian lamp-working table at which he (and Leopold) worked. Beyond that, she also exchanged several letters with Prof. Ames discussing the project, namely the quality and speed of production as Rudolf ages, discussions which on Ames' part vary from controlled excitement to grave concern regarding the project and Rudolf's continuing ability to produce in a satisfactory manner. In 1924 he wrote to Miss Ware to note to great success of the Glass Flowers overall: "You ought to be very happy in the realization that your great gift is one of the outstanding attractions of the country. But Tom Barbour certainly looks a bit disgusted when visitors to the Agassiz Museum asks if the giraffe is made of glass."

It is also known that, in 1898, Mary Lee Ware was made a member of the Committee of Overseers on the Botanic Garden and the Botanic Museum - an addition that was met with pleasure by its members, including Professor Goodale. Indeed, Miss Ware's "generous gifts of money and time for the advancement of the Department...[were] already known from the previous [Harvard] Annual Reports.

Upon her death in 1937, Miss Ware left a will with assets worth one million dollars, $600,000 of which she bequeathed on charity and education. Of this vast sum, a full half of it (the largest single bequest in her will) was given to Harvard for completion and the upkeep of the Glass Flowers (as well as support Rudolf and Frieda).

== The Ware Farm and agricultural work ==
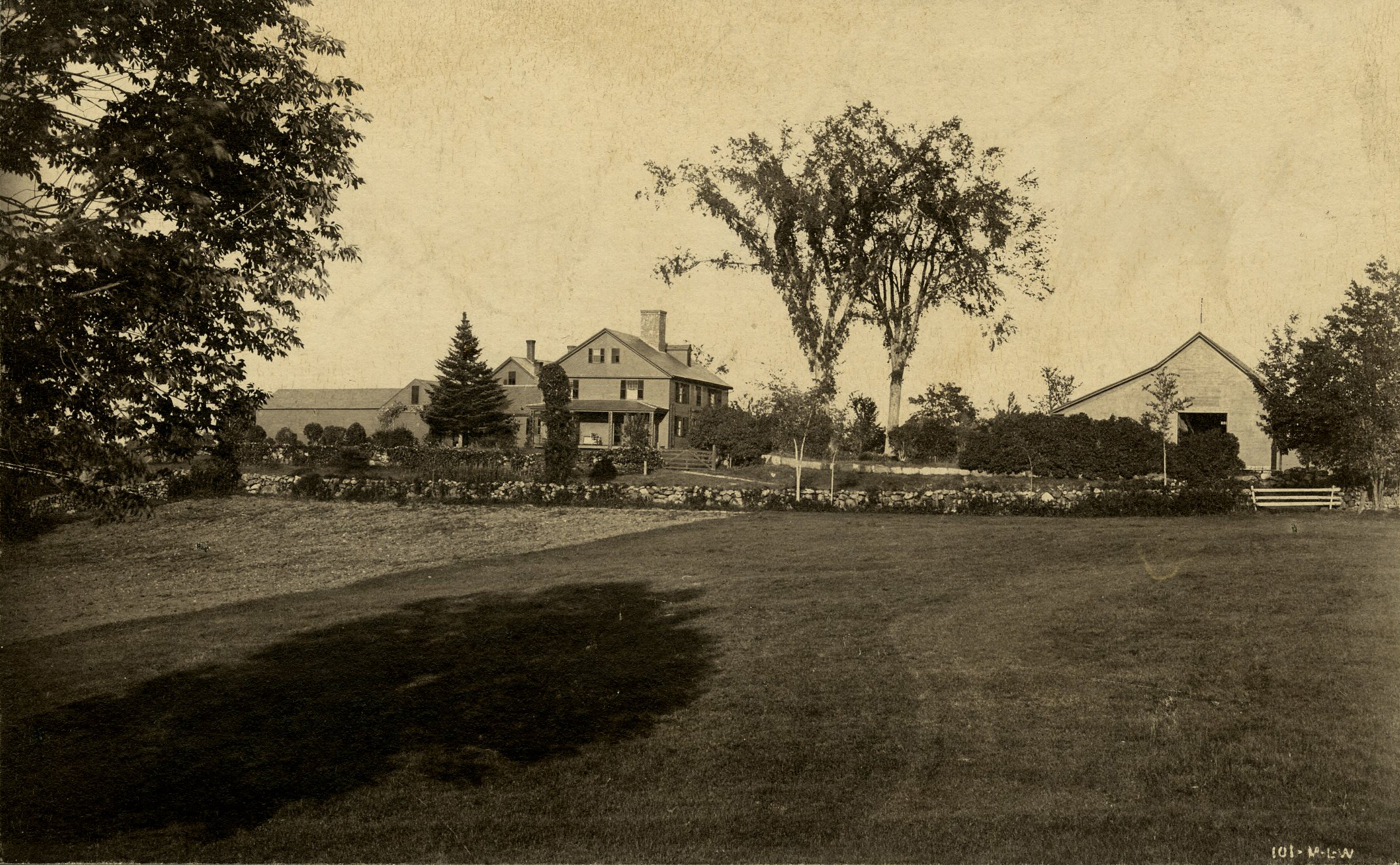
The Ware family farm in Rindge NH

Although her mother remained in Boston, Mary Lee Ware clearly considered herself a New Hampshirite and apparently maintained the West Rindge family farm of her childhood. However, she is almost always called Miss Mary Lee Ware of Boston; very rarely is Rindge, NH mentioned. Reportedly (per the majority of sources) she was a seasonal resident of both Massachusetts and New Hampshire, spending the summers at the Ware Farm in Rindge while wintering in Boston with her mother. The Ware Farm was sold to Mary's father, Dr. Ware, by a Joseph Davis and Dorestos Armory for $3000 in 1868 – the place having 450 total acres, 21.5 dedicated to pasture land with another 56.5 for cultivation. Housing from two to forty people (mostly hired hands), the place was spared from a massive tornado that, on September 13, 1928, hit West Rindge. Enduring for twenty minutes, the disaster leveled the land and resulted in a $100,000 loss for the town. Thankfully, "the beautiful Mary Lee Ware estate proper was not damaged," yet the estate workers' homes suffered via falling trees. Her estate manager, William S. Cleaves, fled his truck - to the relative safety of his home - in the nick of time, just before a falling tree crushed it. Years earlier, in 1887 and 1898 respectively, the farm saw the death of both Miss Ware's parents, Dr. Charles Eliot and Elizabeth C. Ware, making Mary the sole heiress of the estate. Later, in 1931, the Ware farm was the location of her cousin Cordelia E. Ware's wedding (specifically, Cordelia was Mary L. Ware's first cousin once removed on her father's side - the child of his first cousin John Ware).

Under Mary Lee Ware's strict but kind jurisdiction the farm blossomed, so to speak, with Miss Ware expanding it to a scale beyond that of what her parents enjoyed. Between 1898 (the year of her mother's death) and 1936 (a year before she died), she wired the entire farm for electricity, built gardens, all-season greenhouses, equipment barns, and a dairy and ice-house, purchased the neighboring Carr Farm and acreage (later the Ruth Morris Farm) which extends Ware Farm to the eastern shore of Pool Pond (approx. 500 acres), established a water system, and maintained a large-scale chicken operation on the acquired Carr Farm. The Farm was known to be "an outstanding showplace with Jersey cows, poultry, a piggery, sheep, and Irish Settlers, all purebred...in 1911, her three foundation cows and a bull were imported from the Isle of Jersey." Her affection for the family and its many non-family residents is illustrated by the fact that, upon her death, Mary's will designated funds to keep the farm and her "farm family" together for one full year.

=== Legacy ===
It is known that, by at least 1913, Miss Ware was a member of the New Hampshire Horticultural Society. The Grange Hall in Rindge was also named after her — the Mary L. Ware Grange Hall — doubtless in tribute to her many agricultural contributions; and, in addition, a Mary L. Ware Park was established in West Rindge. Sadly, in 1957, the Hall was bought and converted into the Ed’s Country Auction House by Mr. Edward Gilman "Ed" Stevens. Furthermore, in regards to Miss Ware's agrarian impact, the New Hampshire Farm Bureau's highest award was once the Mary Lee Ware Trophy. Regarding her will, Mary left $25000 to her Boston and West Rindge employees. As to the Ware Farm itself, it was given to "certain relatives and their children" but eventually passed out of the family's hands.

However, the Ware Farm remains in active use today. "In 2002 Steve and Beverly Lindell purchased the property, resurrected the Ware Farm name, and have since tended and cherished the property in a manner complementary to its heritage: original buildings are lovingly preserved; the flower gardens are spellbinding and constantly abuzz with pollinators; horses roam and graze the pastures; its forest is managed in conservation through the Monadnock Conservancy. The farm presently consists of 230 acres, the majority on the east side of Woodbound Road, matching closely the original Ware Farm footprint." Today the farm is the home-base of HOOF&CLAW - a training and consultation center for dog handling and horsemanship - as well as the home of Blaine Capone, HOOF&CLAW's founder. Mr. Capone, in turn, continues to honor the legacy and philanthropic spirit of Miss Ware, insofar as her deep love of nature went, working with HOOF&CLAW to preserve the environment and inspire solutions to environmental issues.

== Community involvement ==
As a Philanthropist of many interests, Mary Lee Ware contributed in other many and varied ways to the States of Massachusetts and New Hampshire. However, though "well known locally in NH and Boston for charitable works, she often kept her donations anonymous from the public."

=== Massachusetts ===
Aside from the Glass Flower enterprise, Mary Lee Ware supported Harvard University in other ways, donating four table cases to the Economic Room along with various sums of money for research and preservation purposes, as is evidenced in various Harvard Treasurer's Statements. In addition, she was one of early anthropologist Frederic Ward Putnam of the Peabody Museum of Archaeology and Ethnology many wealthy donors. Correspondences between her and Putnam reveals that Miss Ware provided a significant amount of money for America’s first preserved archaeological site in 1886: Serpent Mound in Ohio, along with Putnam’s other later archaeological endeavors.

Between 1928 and her death (1937), Miss Ware sent a short letter to John Templeton Coolidge regarding a set of spurs she found among her cousin Mr. Hall's books. Spurs which, she speculated, were worn by famed historian Francis Parkman during his expedition he The Oregon Trail. The main body of the letter to Mr. Coolidge reads "The spurs I found among Mr. Hall’s army outfit, labelled “F.P.[”] as you see, and we wondered if by any chance they could have been worn by Mr. Parkman on his “Oregon Trail” journey. It is of course only a guess, but certainly F.P. could only mean Mr. Parkman and Miss Lizzie might have given them to Mr. Hall as a keep-sake. If they were his, possibly your son Jack would like them. If not, you can of course do as you please with them." Miss Ware's cousin, this Mr. Hall, is presumed to be Henry Ware Hall seeing as he shared an uncle with Francis Parkman: "Edward Brooks Hall—the same Hall who had married Mary Lee Ware’s aunt Harriet. So Henry, Francis, and Mary were all first cousins." Mary Lee Ware sent the letter to Mr. Coolidge because he was Parkman’s son-in-law. Said letter was recently obtained by the Massachusetts Historical Society.

Mary's interest in history and cultural artifacts is further noted by the fact that the first annual meeting of the Society for the Preservation of New England Antiquities was held at her 41 Brimmer Street Boston home.

Mary L. Ware did at least some work with the Christian Register, helping in the selection of letters in a 1917 edition. Furthermore, from at least 1906 to 1913 she was a member of the Women's Christian Temperance Union, as known by a pair of letters she exchanged during those respective years to Anne Whitney, a reputable Massachusetts poet and sculptor.

Miss Ware attended the first annual meeting of the Woman's National Farm & Garden Association's New England Branch in Boston, and was elected to the position of "Chairman Executive Committee."

Mary was a corporate member of the Massachusetts School for Idiotic and Feeble-Minded Youth, along with her cousins Charles E. and Harriet P. Ware of Fitchburg and (possible relative) Mrs. Mary G. Ware of Lancaster.

Mary Lee Ware was an officer in the Massachusetts Forestry Association from at least 1906 to 1915, occupying such roles as one of many Vice-Presidents, a member of the Executive Committee along with Ways and Means as well as being the Chairman of the Membership and Publications Committee. As in so many of her roles she was, curiously and again, known as "Mary Lee Ware of Boston," though this could easily be due to her seemingly preferred Rindge residence being outside of Massachusetts.

=== New Hampshire ===
Similarly showing her love of the natural world, in 1901–1902 Mary Lee Ware played a pivotal role in the creation of the New Hampshire Rhododendron State Park when, in 1901, subsequent owner Levi Fuller planned to "lumber off" the property and would have if not for Mary, who bought it in 1902. Giving it to the Appalachian Mountain Club (AMC) a year later, she signed the deal on the condition that the woodland "...be held as a reservation properly protected and open to the public...forever." The contract also barred cutting down any trees or picking any rhododendron, a promise that has been broken only once due to the 1938 hurricane. The donated land is called "Old Patch Place," remodeled by the AMC as a hostel/clubhouse but has since (1946) come under the protection of the N.H. Division of Parks and Recreation — the system's only designated botanical park. The "Old Patch Place" cottage near the park entrance was listed on the National Register of Historic Places in 1980.

Miss Ware was a unit chairwoman of the Women's Committee and Council of National Defense in the Granite State, working with the Federal Food Administrator of New Hampshire.

Also, the Rindge Historical Society Museum's collection of artifacts "began with the efforts of Mary Lee Ware...a seasonal resident of Rindge. Ms. Ware, around the turn of the twentieth century, took it upon herself to solicit donations of historical items from the town’s residents." This collection, today located near the center of Rindge, was once housed at the Ingalls Memorial Library (which would itself later benefit from Mary's generosity). Indeed, in the very first issue of the Rindge Community Newsletter (a volunteer effort by the Rindge Chamber of Commerce), Mary L. Ware was credited with the founding of the Rindge Museum, stating that she asked for the historical donations per "a large horse-drawn wagon and a few of her hired men."

== Death ==
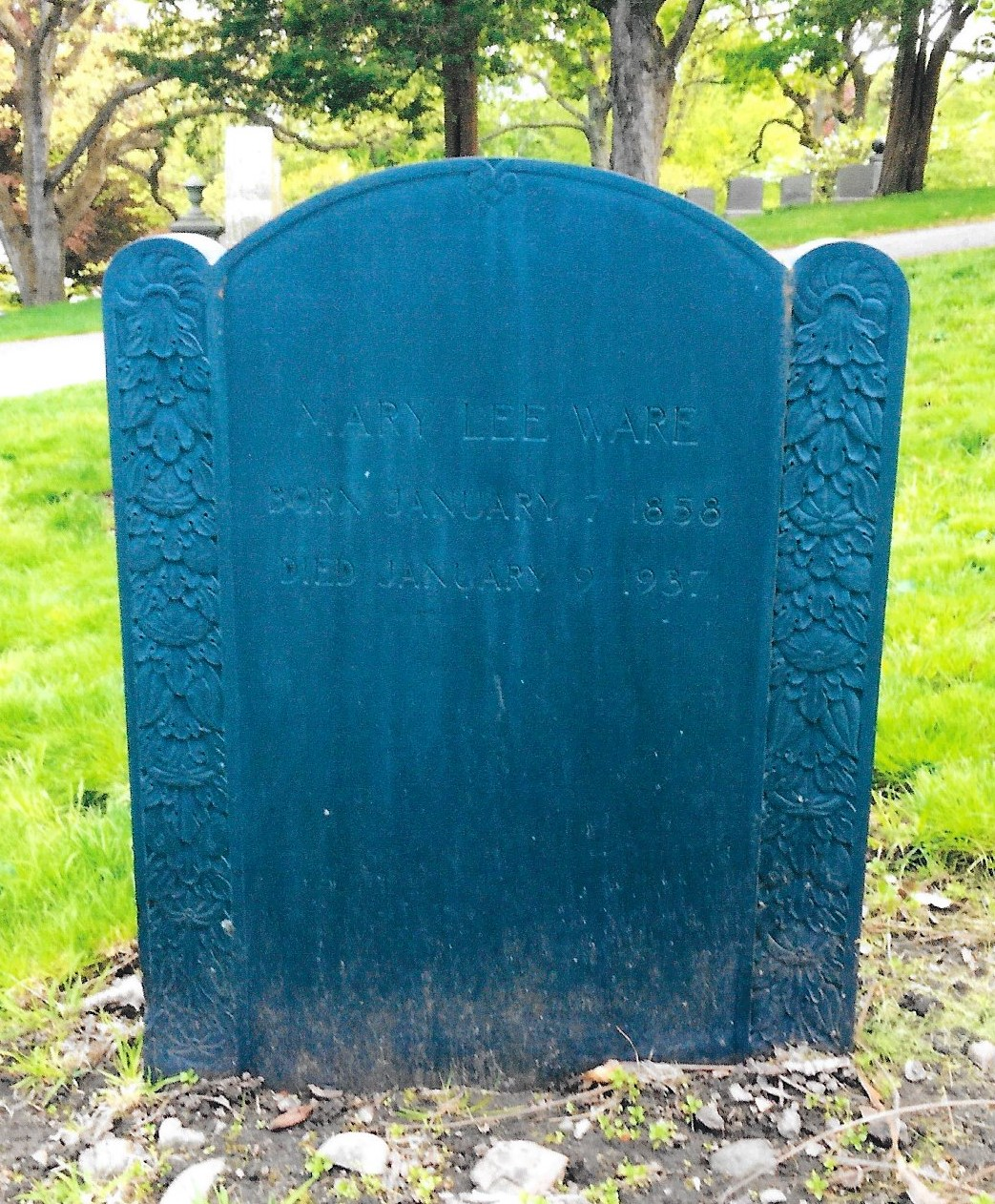
The grave of Mary Lee Ware at Mount Auburn Cemetery

The circumstances of Mary Lee Ware's death - which took place a few months after the Glass Flowers enterprise ended - is described in a letter addressed to Professor Oakes Ames. On January 5 "the poor old lady had a heavy stroke which left her almost completely paralyzed. There seemed to be no question whatever but that she could not possibly recover and, four days later, she had another shock which, thank God, carried her peacefully off." Having died at her 41 Brimmer Street Boston home at the age of 79, Miss Ware was buried next to her parents at Mount Auburn Cemetery, her funeral taking place on January 12 at King's Chapel and officiated over by Reverends John and Palfrey Perkins with many notable personages in attendance, including Francis Goodale (Prof. Goodale's son). Acting as an usher at the funeral was a child named Charles E. Ware 3rd, presumably the son of her cousin Charles Eliot Ware of Fitchburg of whom her will designated a favorable sum. Indeed, another letter to Professor Ames states that a letter of condolence should be sent to Charles E. Ware of Fitchburg, furthering the appearance that the two cousins were close. Miss Mary L. Ware's death was, in addition, reportedly taken hard by Rudolf Blaschka, whose own health was beginning to fail (as detailed in another letter to Professor Ames by Mr. Louis C. Bierweiler, former assistant to Professor Louis Agassiz). In addition, a later letter from a solicitor to the Soviet authorities details a pension that Mary Lee Ware set for Rudolf and which continued to Frieda until 1941 - after which Mrs. Blaschka had no income at all.

It is known that, upon death, Mary's will detailed the donation of her taxidermied bird and animal collection to the Ingalls Memorial Library of Rindge — "The collection native to this region was donated through the generosity and under the will of Mary Lee Ware. It is quite a wonderful collection and many Rindge residents know of its existence because of school visits." She also left them $5000 and, furthermore, was one of the Trustees of and partly responsible for writing the Annual Report of the Library, as she was a signatory of said Report in 1917; this also made her one of the Officers of the Town of Rindge. At some point in life Mary Lee Ware inherited Robert Salmon's The British Fleet Forming a Line off Algiers painting from her father, Dr. Charles Eliot Ware - though how he acquired it is not known. She bequeathed the painting in 1937 (presumably after her death and per her will) to the Museum of Fine Arts (MFA) in Boston, Massachusetts. Additionally, Miss Ware's will detailed sizable donations to organizations such as the Massachusetts General Hospital, Kentucky's Berea College, and the American Unitarian Association. In addition,

== Miscellaneous ==
The independent wealth of Mary L. Ware and her family was owed to the fact that her mother, Elizabeth C. Ware, was a descendant of the wealthy Salem Cabots - a merchant family dating back to the early 1700s.

In 1900 Miss Ware began a subscription to the Fund for the Encouragement of Mexican and Central American Research, as recorded in a Harvard University Annual Report.

The rug on the floor of the Edward Hall Library in the First Parish in Cambridge was "given in memory of Miss Mary Lee Ware, a first cousin of Rev. Edward Hall," who presided as Minister from 1882 to 1893.

Mary Lee Ware reportedly never owned an automobile - apparently traveling to and from Boston via the train, and by horse and buggy when in Rindge.

Mary's relationship with her brother, Charles Ware Jr., is not known. It is known, though, that Charles Jr. also went to Harvard in the 1870s and lived in Boston for a while – marrying in 1881 – before moving to Newton. Why Mary and her mother never involved him (and his wife) in the Glass Flowers enterprise is unknown.
