= George Lincoln Goodale =

American botanist (1839–1923)

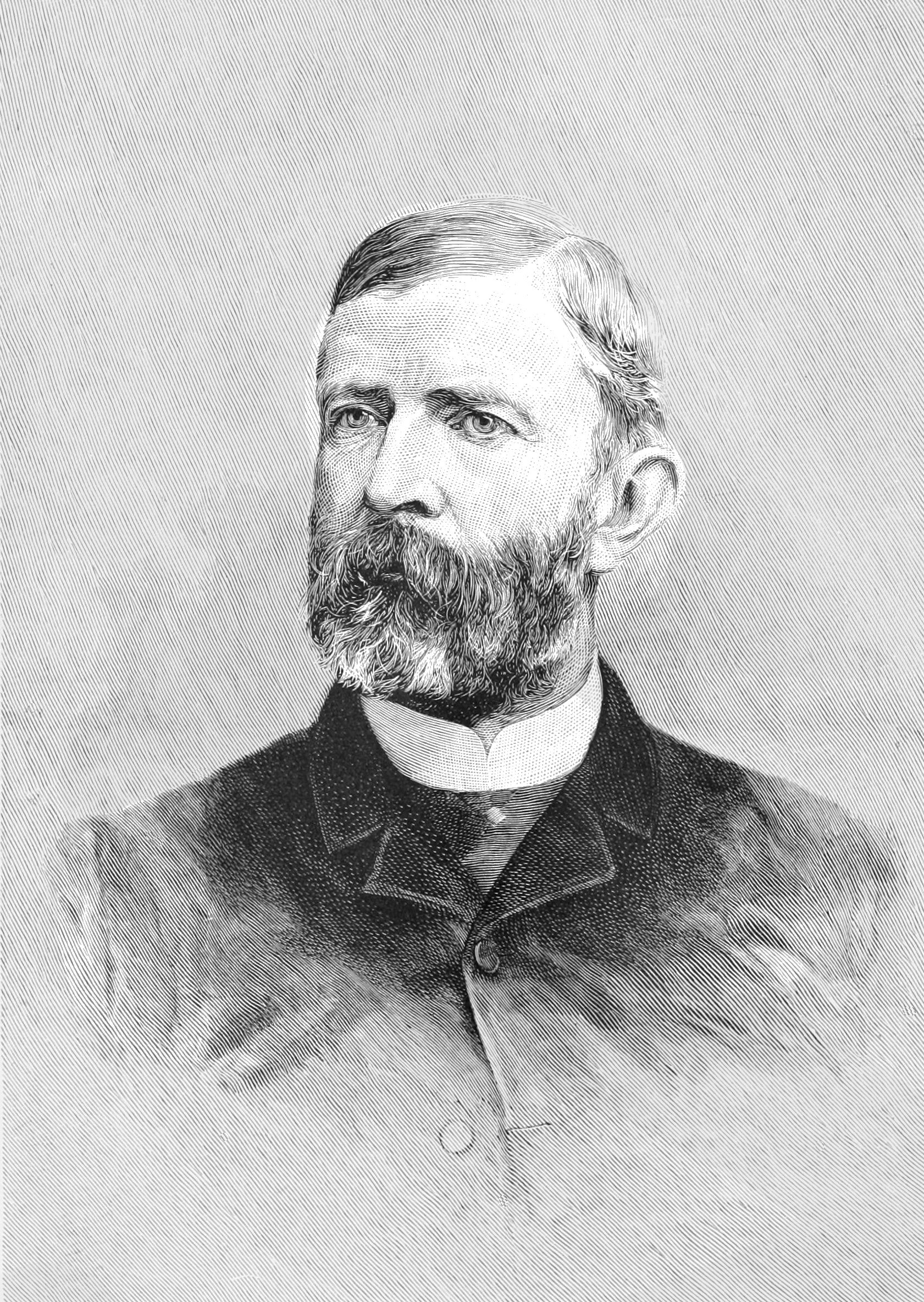
- Born: August 3, 1839; Saco, Maine
- Died: April 12, 1923 (aged 83); Saco, Maine
- Education: Amherst College; Harvard Medical School
- Known for: Glass Flowers
- Scientific career
- Workplaces: Bowdoin College; Harvard University

George Lincoln Goodale (August 3, 1839 – April 12, 1923) was an American botanist and the first director of Harvard's Botanical Museum (now part of the Harvard Museum of Natural History). It was he who commissioned the making of the university's legendary Glass Flowers collection.

== Early life ==
Goodale was born in Saco, Maine. He graduated from Amherst College in 1860 and from Harvard Medical School in 1863, after which he practiced in Portland, Maine, until 1867.

== Career ==
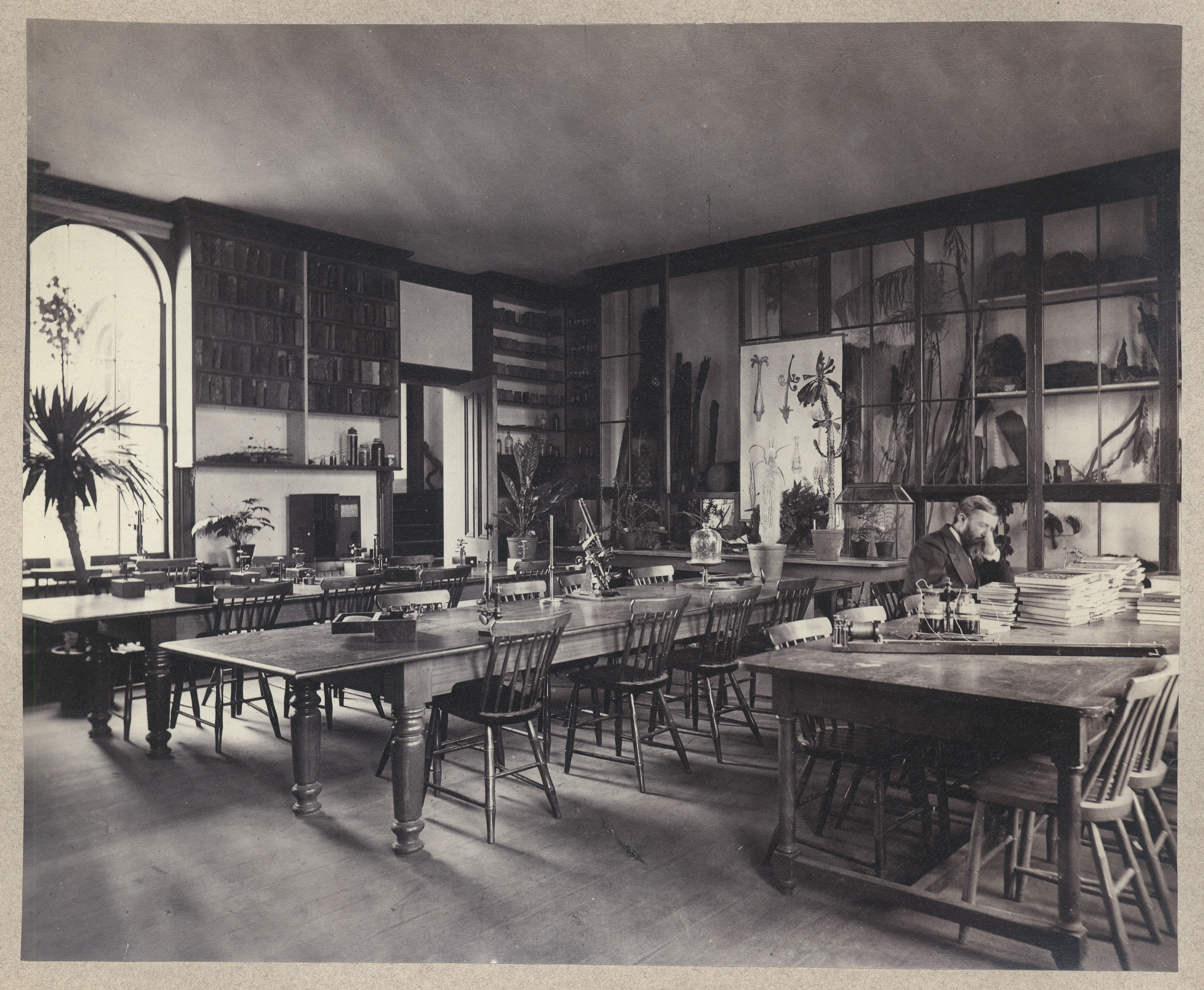
Harvard Professor George Lincoln Goodale in his laboratory.

Goodale became professor of natural science and applied chemistry at Bowdoin. In 1872, he was appointed instructor in botany and University lecturer on vegetable physiology at Harvard, and advanced to assistant professor of the latter subject a year later. In 1878, he became a professor of botany and the Fisher professor of natural science, a chair formerly held by Asa Gray.

=== Glass Flowers ===
At some point during his career as a Harvard/Radcliffe Professor, Goodale taught avid Botany student Mary Lee Ware - born to the Elizabeth Cabot Lee (from then on Elizabeth C. Ware) and Dr. Charles Eliot Ware; a twist of fate that would turn critical later. After 1879, Goodale served as the first director of Harvard's Botanical Museum, but filling it was a slight problem for, at that time, Harvard was the global center of botanical study. As such, Goodale wanted the best, but the only used method was showcasing pressed and carefully labeled specimens — a methodology that offered a twofold problem: being pressed, the specimens were two-dimensional and tended to lose their color. Hence they were hardly the ideal teaching tools. However, Harvard had recently procured several glass marine invertebrates made by German glass artists Leopold and Rudolf Blaschka and, upon seeing them, Professor Goodale realized that glass flowers would solve his problem as, being glass, they were both three-dimensional and would retain their color. The only issue lay in convincing the Blaschkas to undertake such a project and how to fund it. The former took some time - and an advance payment of 200 marks - to accomplish, but eventually the famed glass artists agreed to send test-models to the U.S. and, although damaged in customs, the fragments convinced Goodale that Blaschka glass art was a more than worthy educational investment.

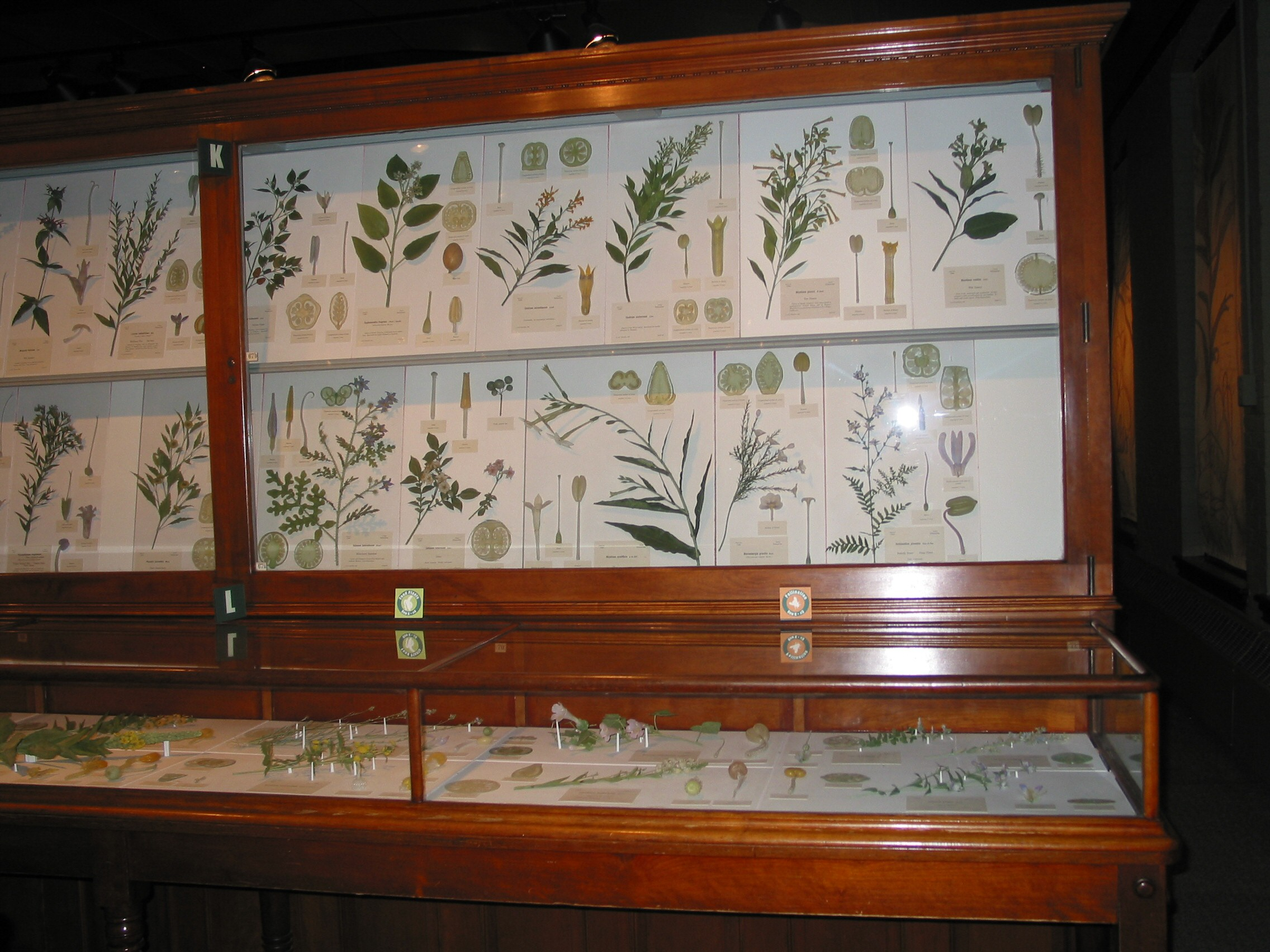
A sample of the Glass Flowers commissioned by Goodale.

But investments require fund, and to cover such an expensive enterprise Goodale approached his former student Mary Lee Ware and her mother with his idea. Being independently wealthy and (already) liberal benefactors of Harvard's botanical department, Mary convinced her mother to agree to underwrite the consignment of the uncannily lifelike models they both were enchanted by. The contract signed dictated that the Blaschkas need only work half-time on the models (beginning in 1887) but, in 1890, they and Goodale - signing on behalf of the Wares - signed an updated version that allowed Leopold and Rudolf to work on them full-time; some sources detail the agreement as a shift from a 3-year contract to a 10-year one, agreed to once Goodale convinced Mary and her mother of the wisdom in doing so. Either way, the Wares liberally funded the entire enterprise. To this day the now world famous Glass Flowers are still on display at the Harvard Museum of Natural History — the exhibit itself dedicated to Dr. Charles Eliot Ware (the deceased father and husband of Mary L. and Elizabeth C. Ware respectively), the official name being The Ware Collection of Blaschka Glass Models of Plants. Moreover, unlike the glass marine invertebrates — which were "a profitable global mail-order business", the Glass Flowers were commissioned solely for and are unique to Harvard.

=== Other ===
Goodale was elected to the American Academy of Arts and Sciences in 1874. In 1889, he served as president of the American Society of Naturalists and president of the American Association for the Advancement of Science. He was elected to the United States National Academy of Sciences in 1890 and the American Philosophical Society in 1893. He also had a wife and son, the latter of whom, Francis Goodale, is known to have attended Mary Lee Ware's funeral on January 12 at King's Chapel. Goodale died in 1923 after, and presumably as a result of, an unknown illness. He was succeeded by Professor Oakes Ames, who takes up Goodale's work at the suggestion of Prof. Henshaw and is eventually made the second director of Harvard's Botanical Museum by President Lowell, becoming an additional contact of Mary Lee Ware regarding the as yet unfinished Glass Flowers enterprise.

== Miscellaneous ==
In addition to monographs and contributions to scientific journals, his publications include:

- Wild Flowers of North America (1882)
- Vegetable Physiology (1885)
- Vegetable Histology (1885)
- Useful Plants of the Future (1891)
- Concerning a Few Common Plants (1879); third edition, 1903
