= Harvard University Herbaria =

Herbarium at Harvard University

Coordinates: 42°22′43.75″N 71°06′52.52″W

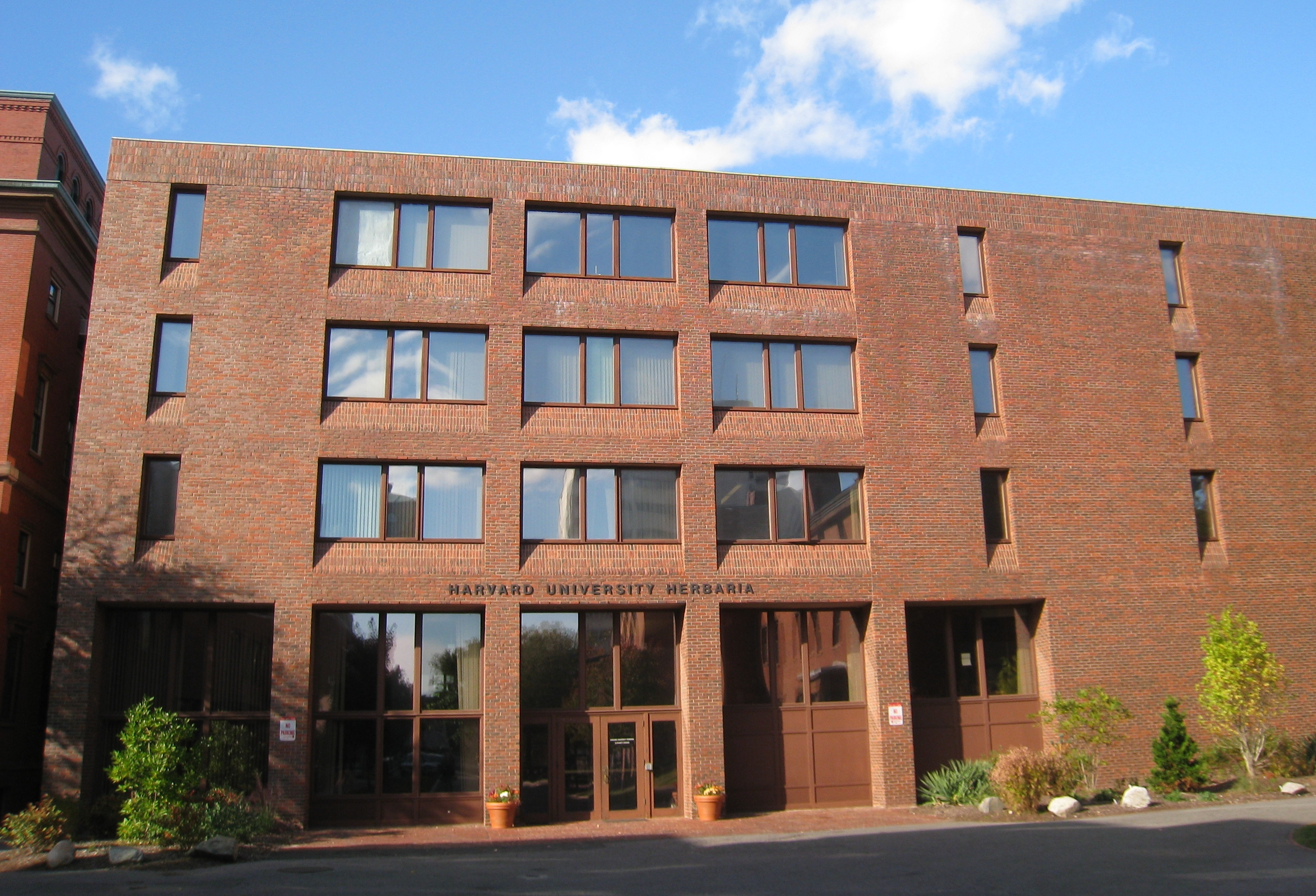
Harvard University Herbaria

The Harvard University Herbaria and Botanical Museum are institutions located on the grounds of Harvard University at 22 Divinity Avenue, Cambridge, Massachusetts. The Botanical Museum is one of three which comprise the Harvard Museum of Natural History.

The Herbaria, founded in 1842 by Asa Gray, are one of the 10 largest in the world with over 5 million specimens, and including the Botany Libraries, form the world's largest university owned herbarium. The Gray Herbarium is named after him. HUH hosts the Gray Herbarium Index (GCI) as well as an extensive specimen, botanist, and publications database. HUH was the center for botanical research in the United States of America by the time of its founder's retirement in the 1870s. The materials deposited there are one of the three major sources for the International Plant Names Index.

The Botanical Museum was founded in 1858. It was originally called the Museum of Vegetable Products and was predominantly focused on an interdisciplinary study of useful plants (i.e., economic botany and horticulture). The nucleus of materials for this museum was donated by Sir William Hooker, director of the Royal Botanic Garden. Professor George Lincoln Goodale became the museum's first director in 1888; under his direction the building was completed in 1890 and provided both research facilities and public exhibit space, which were the botanical complement to the "Agassiz" Museum of Comparative Zoology. Three successive directors substantially enlarged the collections of economic products, medicinal plants, artifacts, archeological materials, pollen, and photographs.

Faculty and students continue to add significantly to the extensive paleobotanical collections, particularly Precambrian material containing early life forms.

The Oakes Ames Collection of Economic Botany, the Paleobotanical Collection (including the Pollen Collection), and the Margaret Towle Collection of Archaeological Plant Remains are housed in the Botanical Museum building. The New England Botanical Society also houses its herbaria of New England flora there. The Botany libraries and various herbaria are located in the Harvard University Herbaria building. The Botany Libraries collectively are a founding member of the Biodiversity Heritage Library.

The Ware Collection of Glass Models of Plants, popularly known as the "Glass Flowers," is considered one of the University's great treasures. Commissioned by Goodale, sponsored by Elizabeth C. Ware and her daughter Mary Lee Ware (Goodale's former student), and created by Leopold and Rudolf Blaschka from 1887 through 1936, the collection comprises approximately 4,400 models including life-size and enlarged parts for over 840 species. This is the only collection of its type in the world.

The Botanical Museum of Harvard University and the other museums that comprise the Harvard Museum of Natural History are physically connected to the Peabody Museum of Archaeology and Ethnology and one admission grants visitors access to all museums.

The Herbaria publishes the journal Harvard Papers in Botany.

The Herbaria is actively digitizing its vascular plant and cryptogamic collections and has digitized > 2 million specimens to date aiming for 90% completion by 2031.
