= Glass Flowers =

Collection of glass botanical models at the Harvard Museum of Natural History

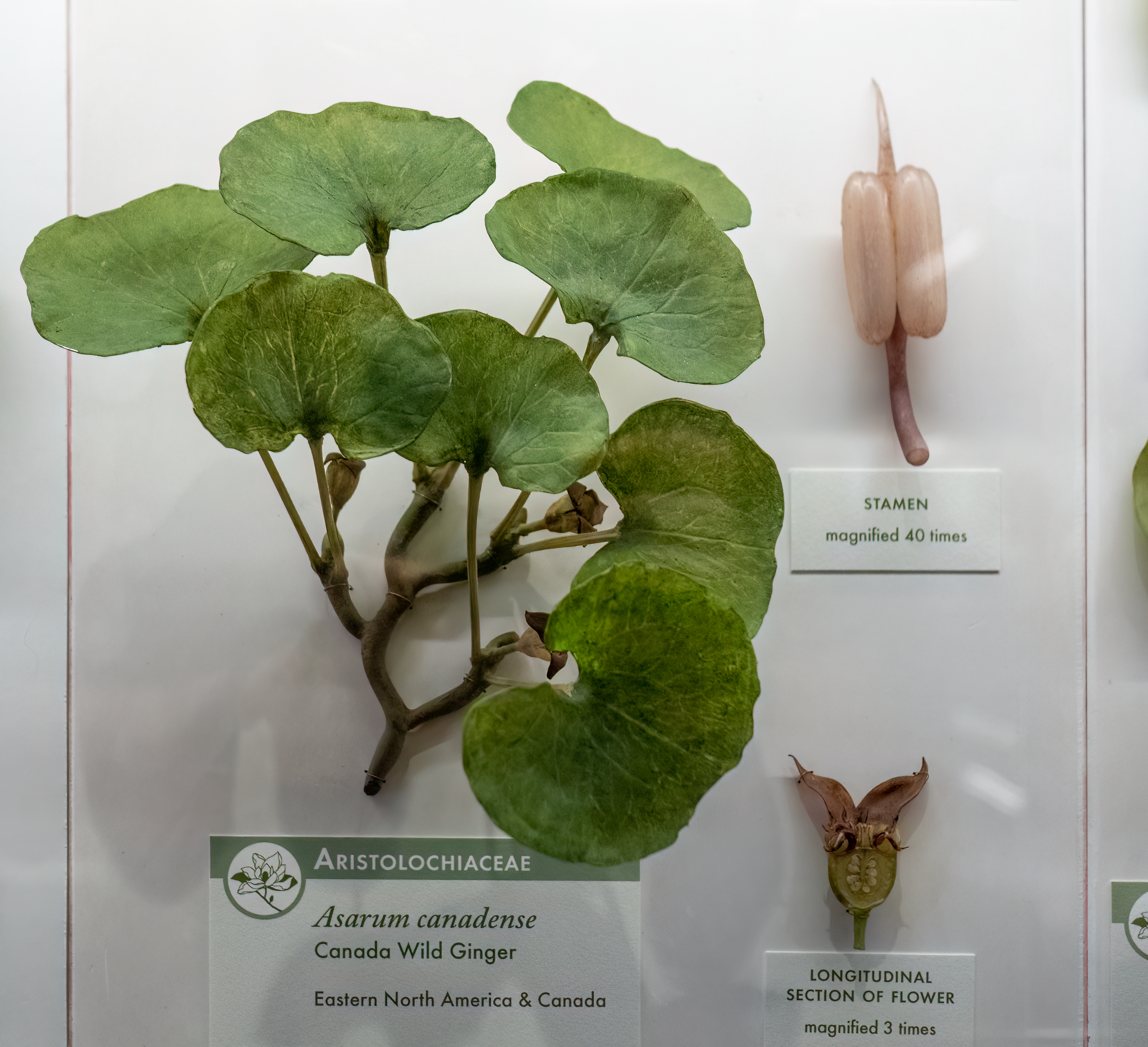
Blaschka glass model of Asarum canadense

The Ware Collection of Blaschka Glass Models of Plants (or simply the Glass Flowers) is a collection of highly realistic glass botanical models at the Harvard Museum of Natural History in Cambridge, Massachusetts, United States.

Created by Leopold and Rudolf Blaschka from 1887 through 1936 at their studio in Hosterwitz, near Dresden, Germany, the collection was commissioned by George Lincoln Goodale, the first director of Harvard's Botanical Museum, and was financed by Mary Lee Ware and her mother Elizabeth C. Ware. It includes 847 life-size models (representing 780 species and varieties of plants in 164 families) and some 3,000 detail models such as of plant parts and anatomical sections. The collection comprises approximately 4,400 individual glass models representing over 830 plant species. Among the models, 64 glass sculptures depict the effect of fungi, in particular plant diseases of Rosaceae by phytopathogens.

== Background ==
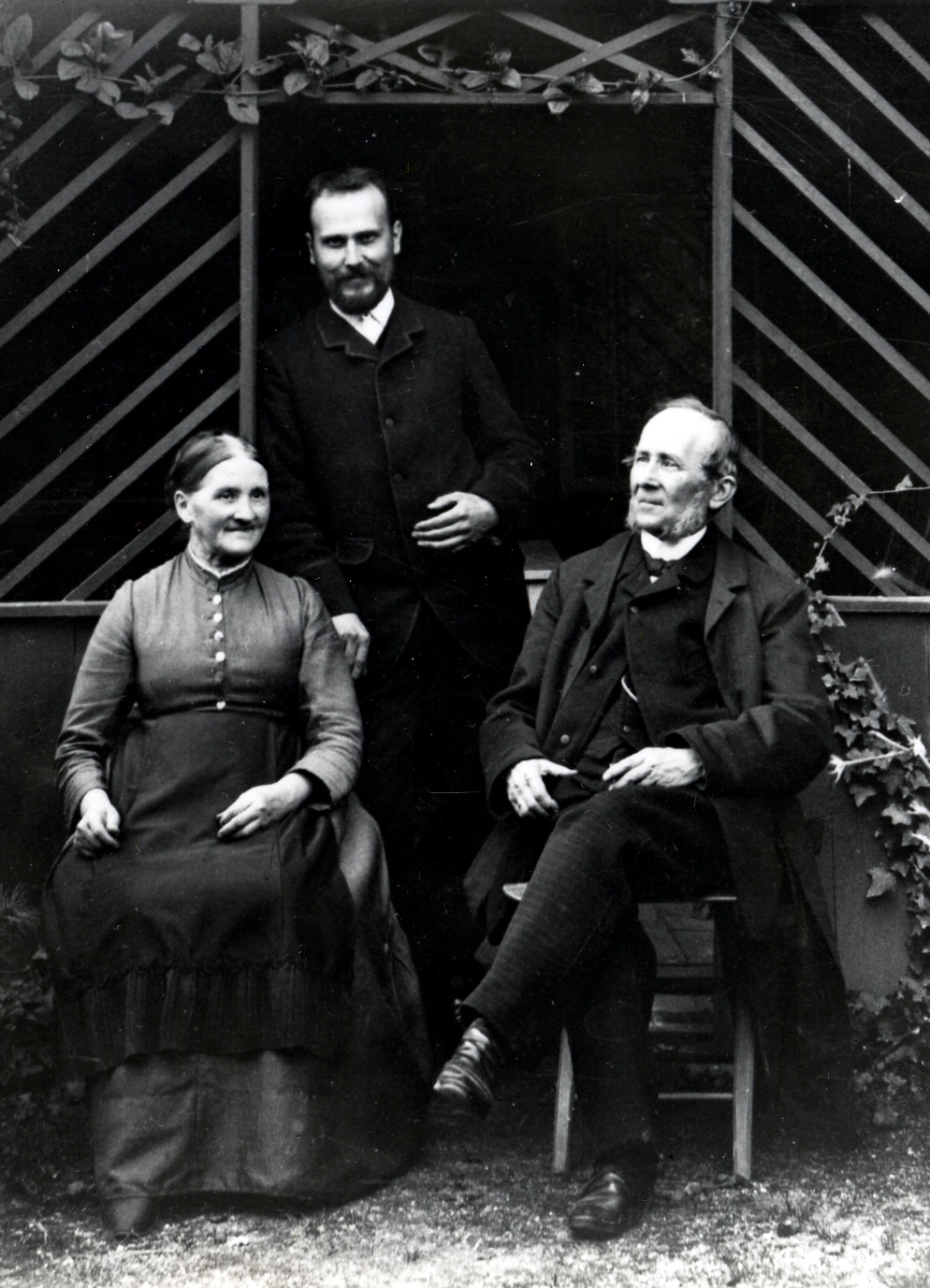
Rudolf (standing) and Leopold Blaschka

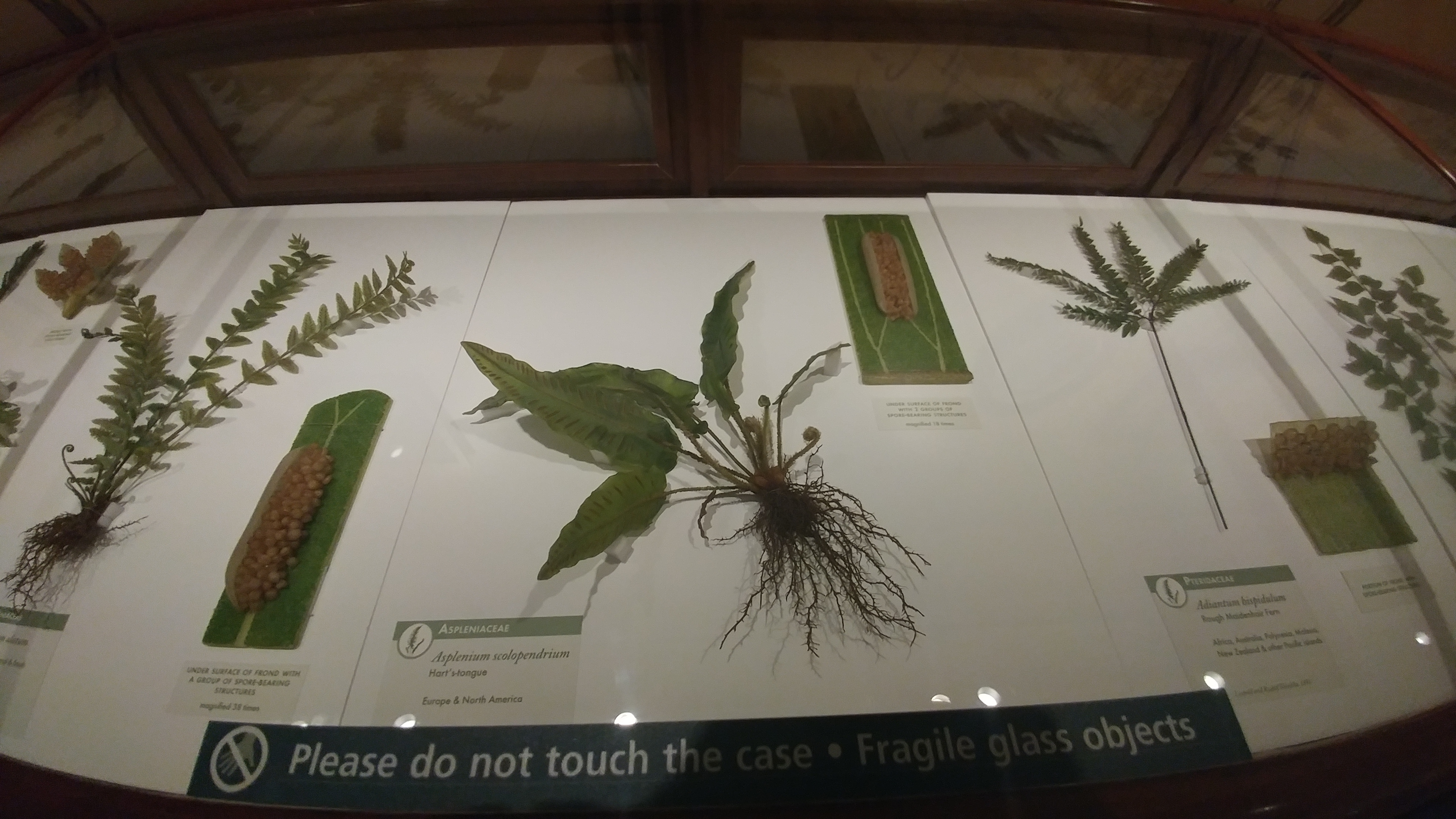
Some of the glass models

Starting in 1863 the Blaschkas had a business making glass models of marine invertebrates, selling them to museums and private collectors in a global enterprise (see).

At the time botanical specimens were pressed, carefully labeled, and put on display. The pressing lost the three-dimensional aspect of the specimens, and the formerly living tissues lost their color. In 1886 the Blaschkas were approached by Professor Goodale, who, after seeing their marine models, went to Dresden to ask them to make a series of glass botanical models for Harvard, which would be three-dimensional and with stable color. Leopold was hesitant but eventually agreed to make some sample models, which, though badly damaged in customs, convinced Goodale of their value in botanical teaching.

To fund the project, Goodale approached his former student Mary Lee Ware and her mother, Elizabeth C. Ware, who were already liberal benefactors of Harvard's botanical department. The original arrangement (in 1887) provided that the Blaschkas would work half time on the project, but in 1890 a new arrangement called for them to work full-time. The work continued until 1936, at which point Leopold and Elizabeth had both died.

The collection is formally dedicated to Dr. Charles Eliot Ware, the deceased father and husband of Mary and Elizabeth Ware, respectively.

== The models ==
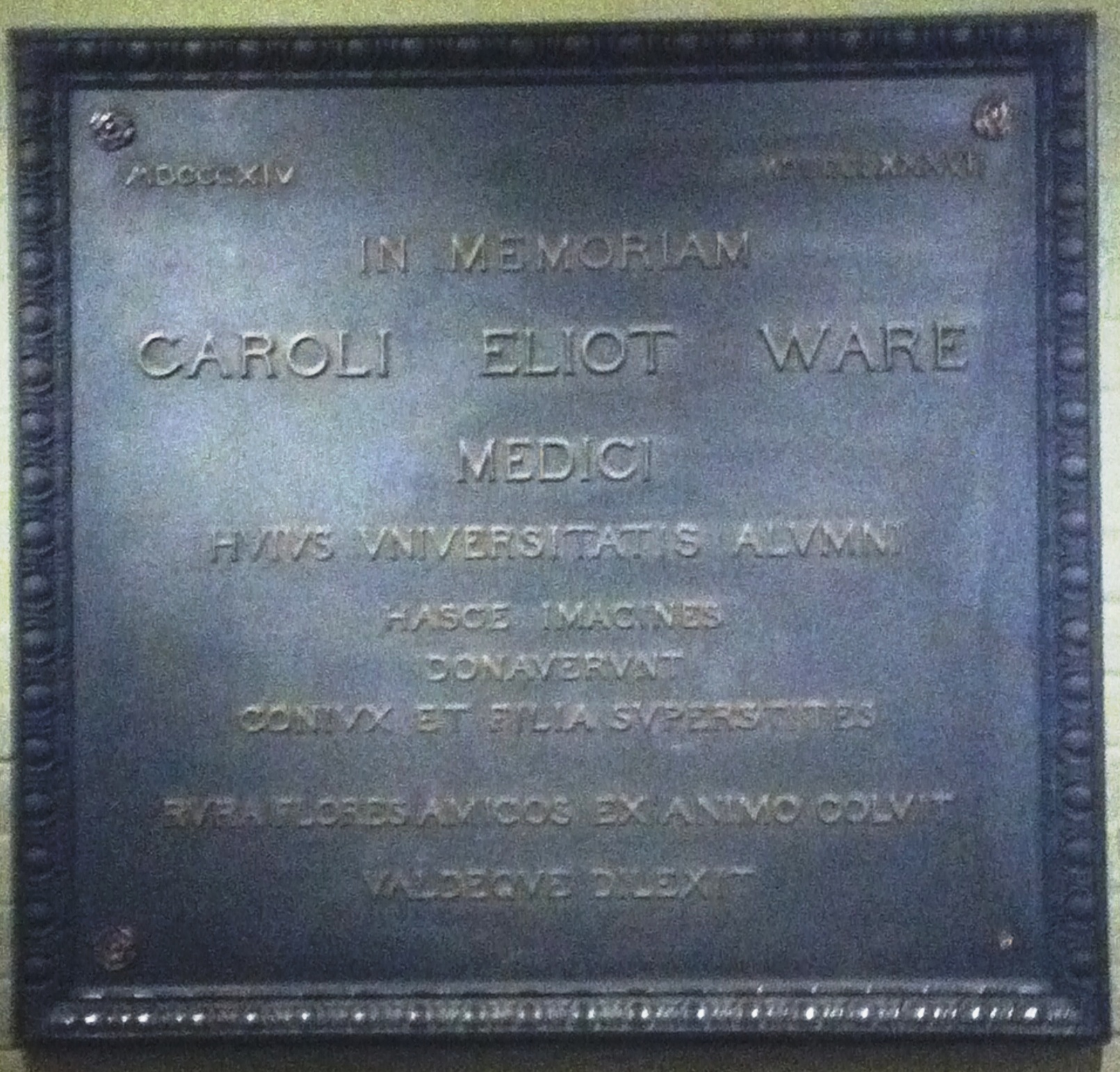
"In memory of physician Charles Eliot Ware (1814–1887), a graduate of this university. These models were presented by his wife and daughter who survived him. He sincerely cherished and deeply loved native plants as friends."

The models are glass with wire supports (internal or external), glue, a variety of organic media, and paint or enamel coloring. The Boston Globe has called them "anatomically perfect and, given all the glass-workers who've tried and failed, unreproducible."

It is often said that the Blaschkas employed secret techniques now lost; in fact their techniques were common at the time, but their skill, enthusiasm, and meticulous study and observation of their subjects in life were extraordinary, which Leopold ascribed to familial tradition, in a letter to Mary Lee Ware: "Many people think that we have some secret apparatus by which we can squeeze glass suddenly into these forms ... The only way to become a glass modeler of skill, I have often said to people, is to get a good great-grandfather who loved glass."

Cactus model

The Blaschkas' primary technique was lampworking, in which glass is melted over a flame fed by air from a foot-powered bellows, then shaped using tools to pinch, pull, or cut; forms were blown as well. Their old-fashioned Bohemian lamp-working table is part of the museum exhibit. Over the years Rudolf brought more and more of the entire production process under his personal control, eventually even manufacturing his own glass and colorants.

Botanist Donald Schnell has called the models "enchanting", and relates his surprise at finding that the models faithfully depict an unpublished detail of a bee's behavior while pollinating a particular plant—a detail which he had privately hypothesized. Whitehouse and Small wrote that "the superiority in design and construction of the Blaschka models surpasses all modern model making to date and the skill and art of the Blaschkas rests in peace for eternity."

== Public response ==
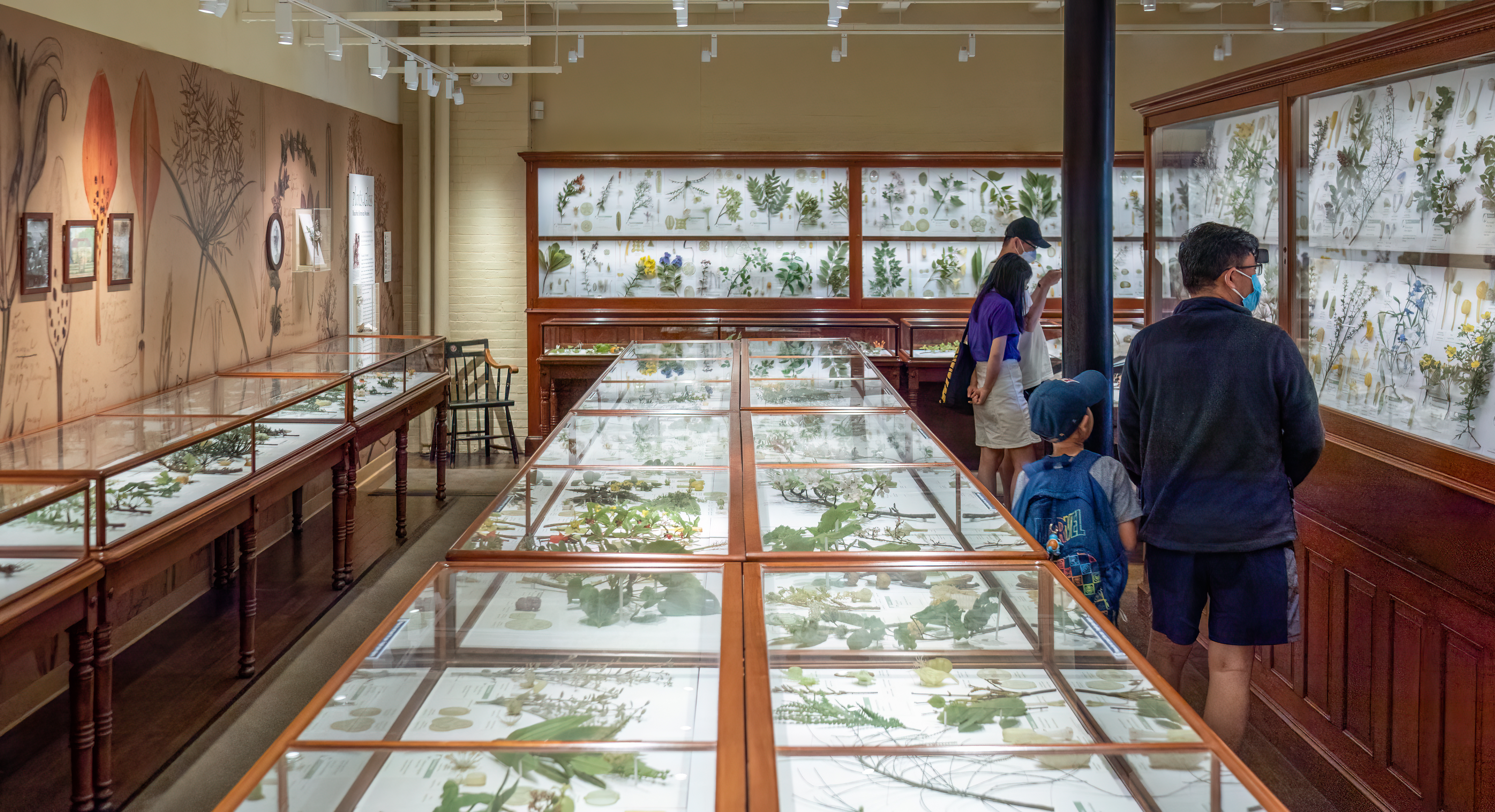
Part of the exhibit

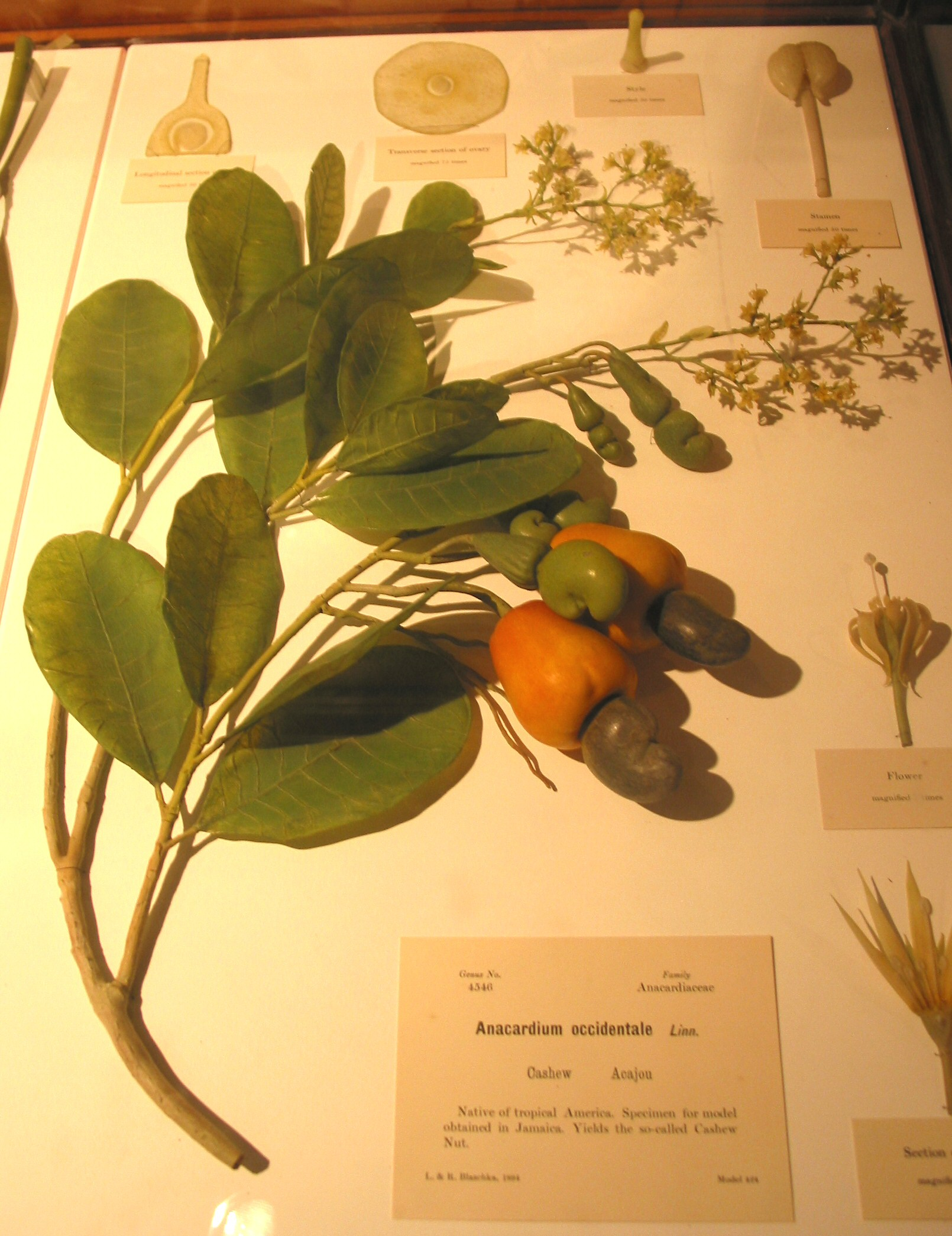
Glass flowers

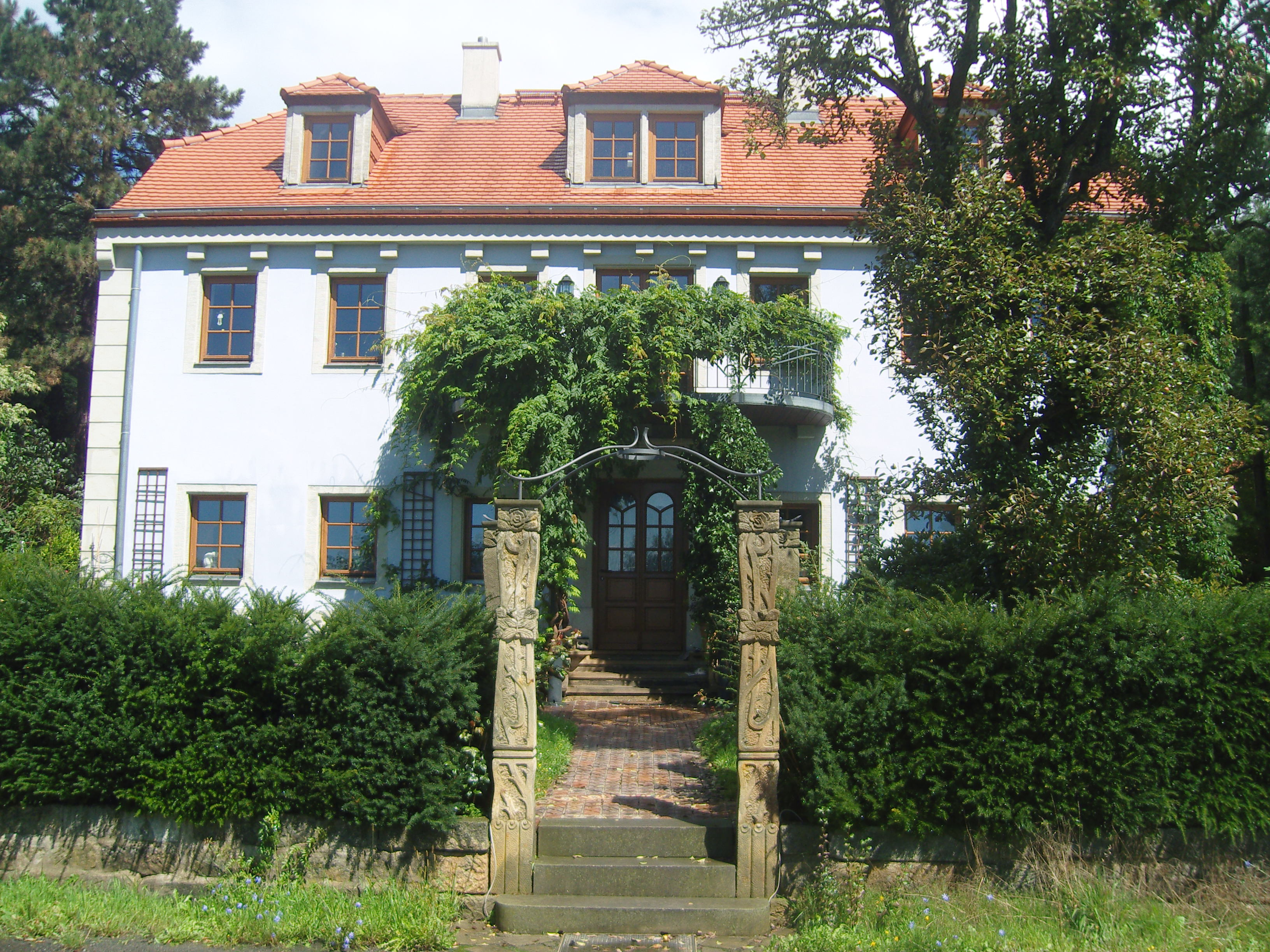
The Blaschka-Haus in Dresden-Hosterwitz

The Glass Flowers is one of the most noted tourist attractions of the Boston area. More than 210,000 visitors view the collection annually. In 1936, when Harvard invited the public to tour the campus in honor of its tercentenary, a New York Times reporter taking the tour commented "Tercentenary or no, the chief focus of interest remains the famous glass flowers, the first of which was put on exhibition in 1893, and which with additions at intervals since, have never failed to draw exclamations of wonder or disbelief from visitors." Many visitors initially believe the Glass Flowers to be real, organic, plants and soon after entering or leaving exhibition inquire "Where are the glass flowers?"

At least two poems feature the flowers:

Mark Doty (winner of the National Book Award for Poetry in 2008), "The Ware Collection of Glass Flowers and Fruit, Harvard Museum", in My Alexandria, 1993,

He's built a perfection out of hunger,
fused layer upon layer, swirled until
what can't be tasted, won't yield,
almost satisfies, an art
mouthed to the shape of how soft things are,
how good, before they disappear.

Marianne Moore wrote in a poem, "Silence",

My father used to say,
"Superior people never make long visits,
have to be shown Longfellow's grave,
or the glass flowers at Harvard."

== See also ==
- Artificial flowers
- Glassblowing
- Lampworking
