= Judith Inglese =

American artist

- Born: Takoma Park, Maryland, United States
- Education: Accademia di Belle Arti, Rome; School of the Museum of Fine Arts, Boston; Sarah Lawrence College
- Website: http://www.judithinglese.com

Detail of a public artwork by Inglese, featuring a tribute to Marcel Duchamp.

Judith Inglese is an American artist known for her large public ceramic murals and her illustrations in the children's books of Dedie King. She is the daughter of Frank Caplan and Theresa Caplan, the founders of Creative Playthings.

== Life and education ==
Juditih Inglese received her Bachelor of Arts from Sarah Lawrence College and studied ceramics and sculpture at the Accademia de Belle Arti, Rome and School of the Museum of Fine Arts, Boston. She lives in Leverett, Massachusetts.

== Ceramic murals ==
Inglese creates ceramic tile murals that are in bas-relief. Inglese hand-cuts and glazes the ceramic tiles, fitting together the tiles like a puzzle upon placing the mural in its final location. She has created major public art works for the National Zoo in Washington, D.C., as well as at hospitals, recreational facilities, libraries, and other public venues throughout the country.

Public artworks by Inglese include:

- 1983: Play is Children's Work, Fletcher-Maynard Academy, Cambridge, Massachusetts
- 1983: Untitled ceramic frieze, Rockville Municipal Swim Center, Rockville, Maryland
- 1992 Ceramic frieze spanning three corridors, Memorial Elementary School, East Hampton, Connecticut
- 1984: I'd Hammer Out Love Graham & Parks School, Cambridge, Massachusetts
- 1996: A Community Honored, four ceramic murals at the Tyler/Vernon (DART station) of Dallas Area Rapid Transit, Dallas Texas
- 1999: Every Person Has a Song to Sing, Rockville Senior Center, Rockville, Maryland
- 2004: Two ceramic murals at the entrance to the Martin County Health Department, Stuart, Florida
- 2007: Ceramic frieze, Headquarters of Redlands Christian Migrant Association, Immokalee, Florida
- 2009: The Current of Life is Ever Onward, 3 ceramic murals, Rockville Town Square, Rockville, Maryland
- 2010: Landscape, ceramic frieze, Brevard County Children's Services, Viera, Florida

== Book illustrations ==
Inglese has worked with children's author Dedie King to create a series of books that depict cultural elements of a specific country as seen through the eyes of a child narrator, called I See the Sun. The books are published in English and in the language of the country the child lives in, including Mandarin Chinese. The books began being published in 2010 by Satya House Publications. In 2010, I See the Sun in China won an award from Creative Child magazine as well as the Teachers Choice Award for the Family.

Books illustrated by Inglese include:

- King, Dedie, I See the Sun in Afghanistan. Hardwick: Satya House Publications (2011). ISBN 0-9818720-8-5
- King, Dedie, I See the Sun in China. Hardwick: Satya House Publications (2010). ISBN 0-9818720-5-0
- King, Dedie. I See the Sun in Nepal. Hardwick: Satya House Publications (2010). ISBN 0-9818720-9-3
- King, Dedie. I See the Sun in Russia. Hardwick: Satya House Publications (2012). ISBN 1-935874-08-X

== References and further reading ==
- Inglese, Judith. "Report: the Hands and Hearts Family Tile Making project." Arts in Psychotherapy 27:4 (2000): 273–276.
