= Caplan Collection =

Collection at The Children's Museum of Indianapolis

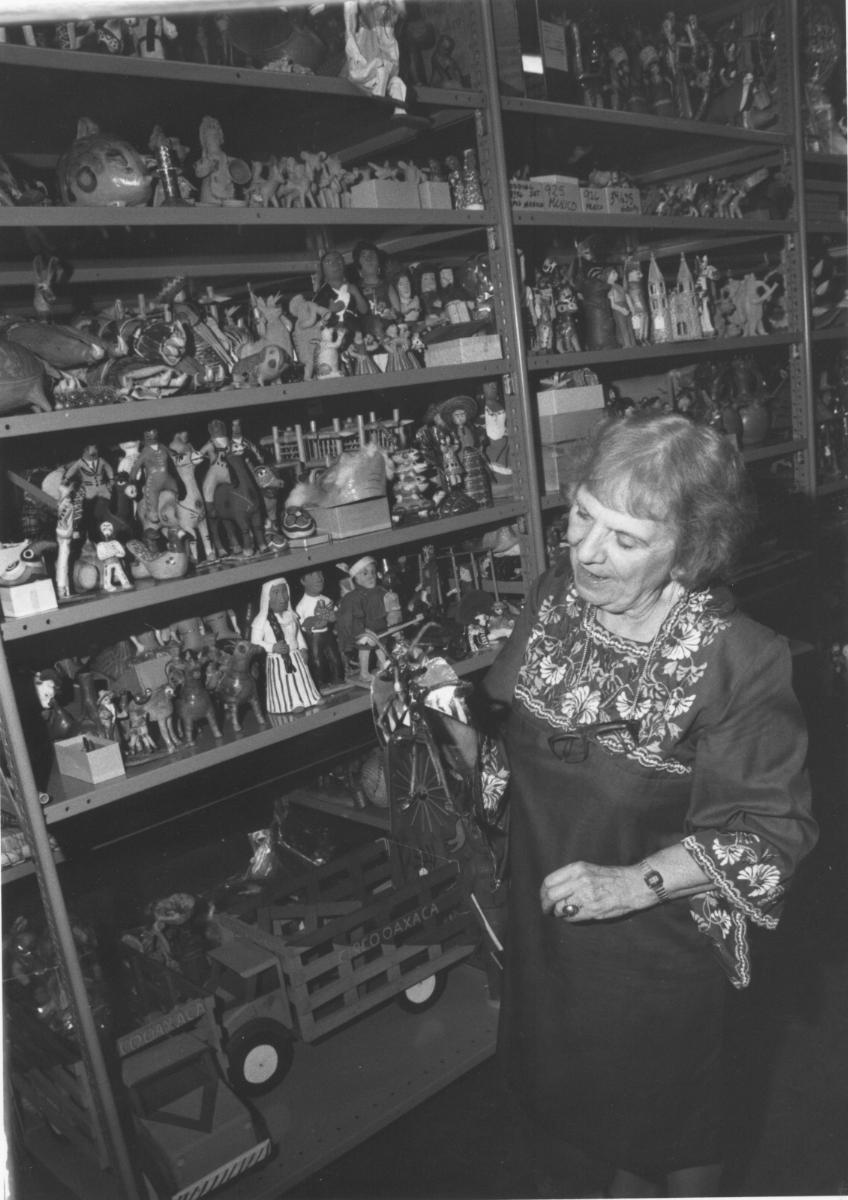
- Theresa Caplan with some of the collection
- Housed at: The Children's Museum of Indianapolis, Indianapolis, Indiana, U.S.
- Size (no. of items): nearly 32,000

The Caplan Collection of folk art and childhood artifacts is held by The Children's Museum of Indianapolis; in 1984 it was donated by Frank and Theresa Caplan, owners of the Creative Playthings toy company. The museum began accessioning the collection in January 1985. The collection consists of nearly 32,000 objects, from toys to dolls to games to musical instruments to masks to clothing to folk art from over 120 countries. The museum created a specific exhibit for the collection, entitled "Passport to the World," which opened in 1986. Initially the Caplans had intended for the collection to be the basis of a new Museum of Fantasy and Play, but this never materialized and they donated their collection to the Children's Museum instead. The Caplans spent about US$1 million acquiring the objects from around 1965 to 1985; some of the countries strongly represented are Japan, Mexico, Russia, Germany, Indonesia, and India.

== Acquisition ==
Theresa Caplan had organized the entire collection, using 20,000 meticulously documented notecards in 28 shoe boxes.

All of the cards were organized by country and category. The collection was moved in three semi trucks containing 1500 boxes from a warehouse and the Caplan's home in Princeton, New Jersey to Indianapolis. All the objects were temporarily housed in space provided by Eli Lilly and Company, where they were fumigated to prevent any insects from entering the museum storage area. Subsequent transport of the collection from the warehouse to the museum and unpacking all the 50,000 pieces took museum staff members 10 months to complete.

== Passport to the World exhibit ==
The Caplan Collection was extensively used within the exhibit Passport to the World which opened in 1986. The theme of the exhibit was: "All people celebrate, communicate, imagine and create, but in different ways." The exhibit was divided into four areas that displayed artifacts showing how the four parts of the theme were depicted in cultures around the world.

An opening reception was held on December 6, 1986. Present that evening were Frank and Theresa Caplan, members of their family, local dignitaries, diplomats from the United Nations and several of the countries represented in the collection along with more than 500 invited guests and international entertainers. Members of Pedro Linares' family from Mexico demonstrated the making of alebrijes, their unique, fantasy, papier mache creatures while groups of international musicians and dancers performed throughout the museum.

== Folk art and toys ==
Highlights of the collection include shadow puppets from Indonesia and India, carved wood puppets from Mali and Burma, a gourd helicopter from Mexico, a gamelan orchestra from Indonesia, a beaded stool from Cameroon, a castanet rattle from Portugal, cornhusk figures from Czechoslovakia, toys made by children from Zaire, Tanzania and Brazil, weavings from Egypt, carved figures from Poland, and ceremonial masks from Sri Lanka, Japan, Guatemala, Nepal and Burkina Faso.

=== Expanding the collection ===
Since the original donation by the Caplans, the museum has continued to collect objects that enhance and strengthen the collection. Of these acquisitions, highlights include a raven transformation mask of the Kwakiutl people, British Columbia and Day of the Dead figures from Mexico. Unique objects include figural coffins made by Kane Kwei and Paa Joe of the Ga people of Teshi-Accra, Ghana.

== Folk artists ==
Works by many internationally renowned artists are contained in the collection: paper machéalebrijes by the Linares family of Mexico, soft sculpture by Andjelka Filipovic of Yugoslavia, carved wood figures by Tadeusz Adamski of Poland, a doll by Sasha Morganthaler of Switzerland, clay figures by Teodora Blanco of Mexico, Native American storyteller figures by Dorothy Trujillo of the Cochiti Pueblo in New Mexico, well as thousands of anonymous craftspersons whose works were purchased by the Caplans in markets and bazaars of the countries they visited.

== Gallery ==
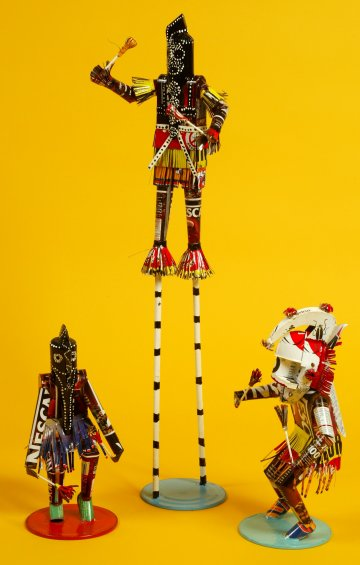
A Dogon dancer

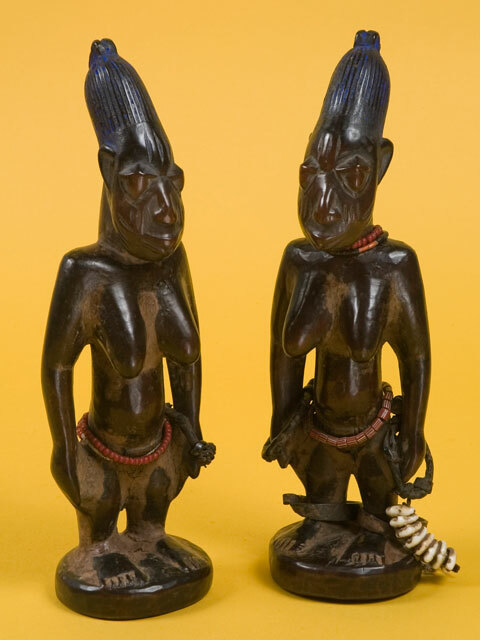
Female ere ibeji twin figures
