= DNA Tower =

- Artist: Dale Chihuly
- Year: 2003
- Type: Glass, Steel
- Dimensions: 6.2 m (20.2 ft); 1.4 m diameter (4.7 ft)
- Location: Indianapolis, Indiana, United States; 39°46.661′N 86°10.700′W
- Owner: Indiana University School of Medicine

DNA Tower, a public sculpture by American glass artist Dale Chihuly, is in the Morris Mills Atrium of the VanNuys Medical Science Building, on the campus of Indiana University-Purdue University Indianapolis (IUPUI), which is near downtown Indianapolis, Indiana. It was commissioned for the Indiana University School of Medicine through a gift from an anonymous donor and was dedicated on September 30, 2003.

DNA Tower is 20.2 feet (6.2 m) tall and 4.7 feet (1.4 m) in diameter; its wooden base is 5.4 feet (1.6 m) in diameter.

== Description ==
The sculpture is a symbolic, rather than accurate, representation of Deoxyribonucleic acid, (DNA), the blueprint of life. DNA is a double-helix molecule, and its distinctive shape is often described as a twisted ladder. The outside of the twisted ladder is composed of sugar and phosphate groups, while the rungs, or steps, of the ladder are formed by two nucleobases connecting to each other via hydrogen bonds.

The sculpture is composed of 1,200 blown-glass globes and weighs a total of 3,000 pounds. Each globe has a different texture and weighs between 1 and 2 pounds. The mauve, green and blue globes represent the four nucleobases, while the yellow globes represent the double helix, or sugar and phosphate group, to which the bases are attached. The glass is held in place by a steel armature that is painted blue. The base support of the sculpture is surrounded and protected by a 5' tall circular cherry wood base that is 5'5" in diameter.

== Acquisition ==
DNA Tower was commissioned to commemorate both the 100th anniversary of the IU School of Medicine (founded 1903) and the 50th anniversary of the discovery of the structure of the DNA molecule (discovered 1953) by 1950 IU alumnus James D. Watson and his colleague Francis Crick.

The glass pieces and painted steel armature were fabricated in Chihuly's Seattle studios.

On September 23, 2003, the Indiana University School of Medicine launched a statewide, week-long centennial celebration at each of its nine campuses. The installation of the glass components of DNA Tower began on September 24, 2003. When the globes were removed from their crates, installation experts and volunteers carefully sorted and organized them. The globes were then attached to the armature by metal wire. A time-lapsed video of the installation is available at Chihuly's official website.

On September 30, 2009, the unveiling and dedication of Chihuly's DNA Tower sculpture in the Morris Mills Atrium of the VanNuys Medical Science Building coincided with the dedication of the new, 128,215-square-foot (11,911.6 m^{2}) Indiana University's School of Medicine Research II facility on IUPUI's campus. The Research II facility houses the Stark Neurosciences Research Institute, Walther Oncology Center, Indiana Center of Excellence in Biomedical Imaging and the Indiana Center for Biological Microscopy.

Of DNA Tower, Chihuly stated: "This installation is really unlike anything I’ve created before – I’m proud that it will be on permanent view at the Indiana University School of Medicine."

== Artist ==
Dale Chihuly is an internationally recognized glass artist and entrepreneur. He was born in Tacoma, Washington in 1941. Chihuly received an M.S. in sculpture from the University of Wisconsin-Madison in 1967 and earned his M.F.A. in Ceramics from Rhode Island School of Design (RISD) in 1968. He became the first American to apprentice at Venice's Venini Glass Factory in 1968. Chihuly then began to specialize in glass. However, a car accident in 1976 and subsequent surfing injury in 1979 caused Chihuly to relinquish the position of gaffer, or chief glassblower, for good. Chihuly has since directed the work of others at his studio in Seattle, employing around 100 people.

In 1992, Chihuly was honored as a Living National Treasure by the Institute for Human Potential at the University of North Carolina. He has also received numerous honorary doctorates and awards, including two National Endowment for the Arts Individual Artist grants. As of 2005, Chihuly's work was exhibited in over 170 museums around the world. In 2004, Chihuly's earnings were estimated at $29 million.

=== Related sculptures ===
==== Life ====
In 2004, Chihuly was commissioned by Van Andel Institute (VAI) founder Jay Van Andel to create another DNA glass sculpture, entitled Life. Dedicated on October 27, 2005, the 14-foot, 1,200 pound Life is suspended from the ceiling in the VAI lobby located in Grand Rapids, Michigan. Although Life is a memorial to Jay Van Andel's wife and VAI co-founder Betty Van Andel, it is also considered to be a commemoration of the 1953 discovery of the structure of DNA.

==== Fireworks of Glass ====
Indianapolis is also home to Chihuly's largest permanent installation of blown glass to date, Fireworks of Glass Tower and Ceiling (2006), at the Children's Museum of Indianapolis. Fireworks of Glass consists of two parts: a ceiling filled with 1,600 pieces of glass and a 43-foot (13 m) tower constructed of over 3,200 pieces and weighing 18,000 pounds. According to the Seattle Times, President and CEO Jeffery H. Patchen convinced the museum's board to commission the piece for $4.5 million.

== Documentation ==
A Museum Studies course at IUPUI recently undertook the project of researching and reporting on the condition of 40 outdoor sculptures on the university campus. Although DNA Tower is located inside the VanNuys Medical Science Building, it was included in this movement due to its high profile on IUPUI's campus. This documentation was influenced by the successful Save Outdoor Sculpture! 1989 campaign organized by Heritage Preservation: The National Institute of Conservation partnered with the Smithsonian Institution, specifically the Smithsonian American Art Museum. Throughout the 1990s, over 7,000 volunteers nationwide have cataloged and assessed the condition of over 30,000 publicly accessible statues, monuments, and sculptures installed as outdoor public art across the United States.

== See also ==
- List of works by Dale Chihuly
