= Electrical cell =

Electrical cell may refer to:

- Electrochemical cell, a device which produces electricity through chemical reactions, commonly referred to as a battery
- Solar cell, a device which produces electricity from sunlight
- Electrolytic cell, a device which decomposes chemical compounds through electrolysis
- electric cell can convert chemical energy into electrical energy
