= Bernard Gitton =

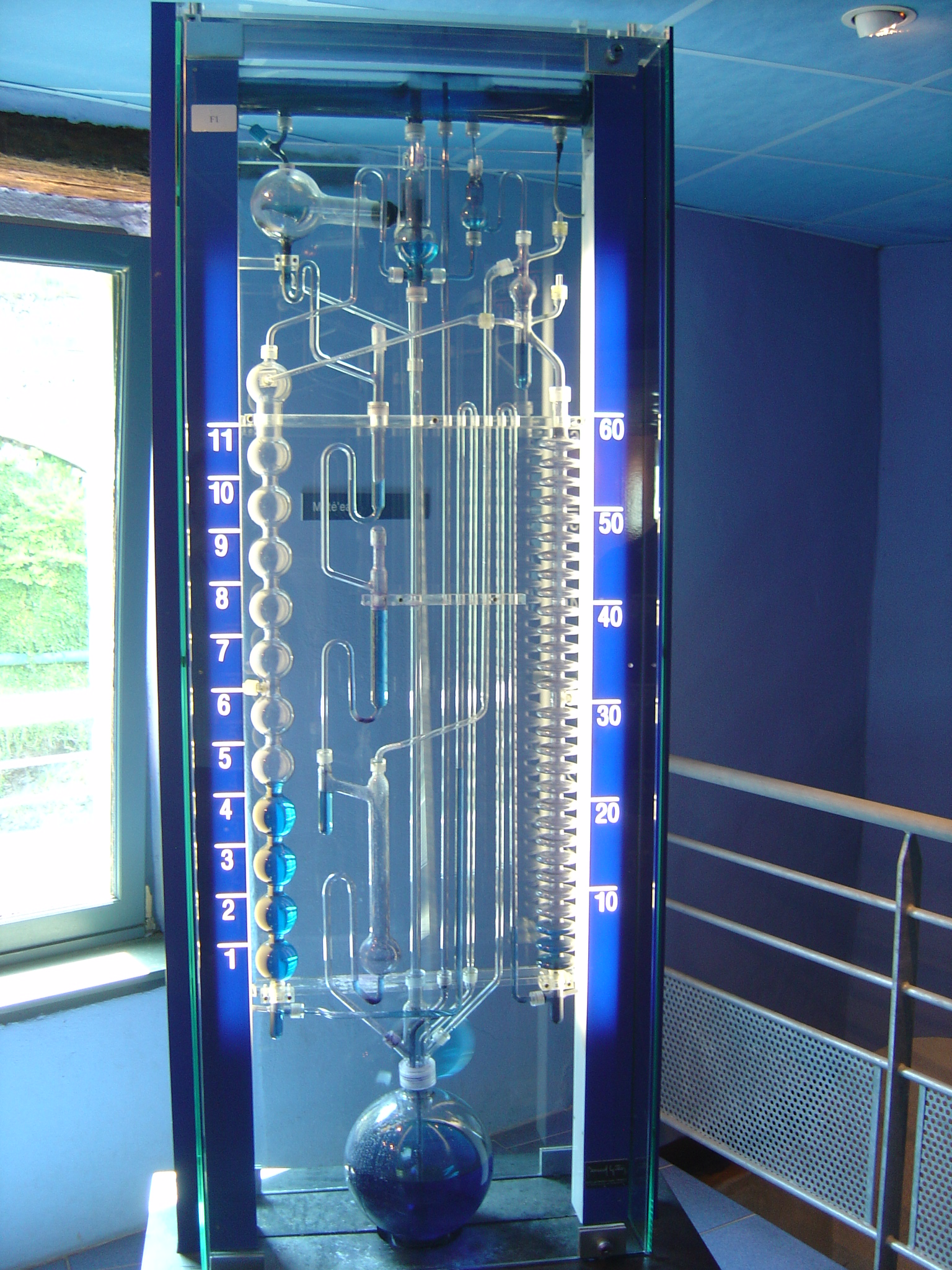
Modern water clock by Bernard Gitton

Bernard Gitton (French pronunciation: [bɛʁnaʁ ʒitɔ̃]); born 24 June 1935) is a French physicist and artist who has built modern water clocks, fountains and other devices relating art and science.

== Biography ==
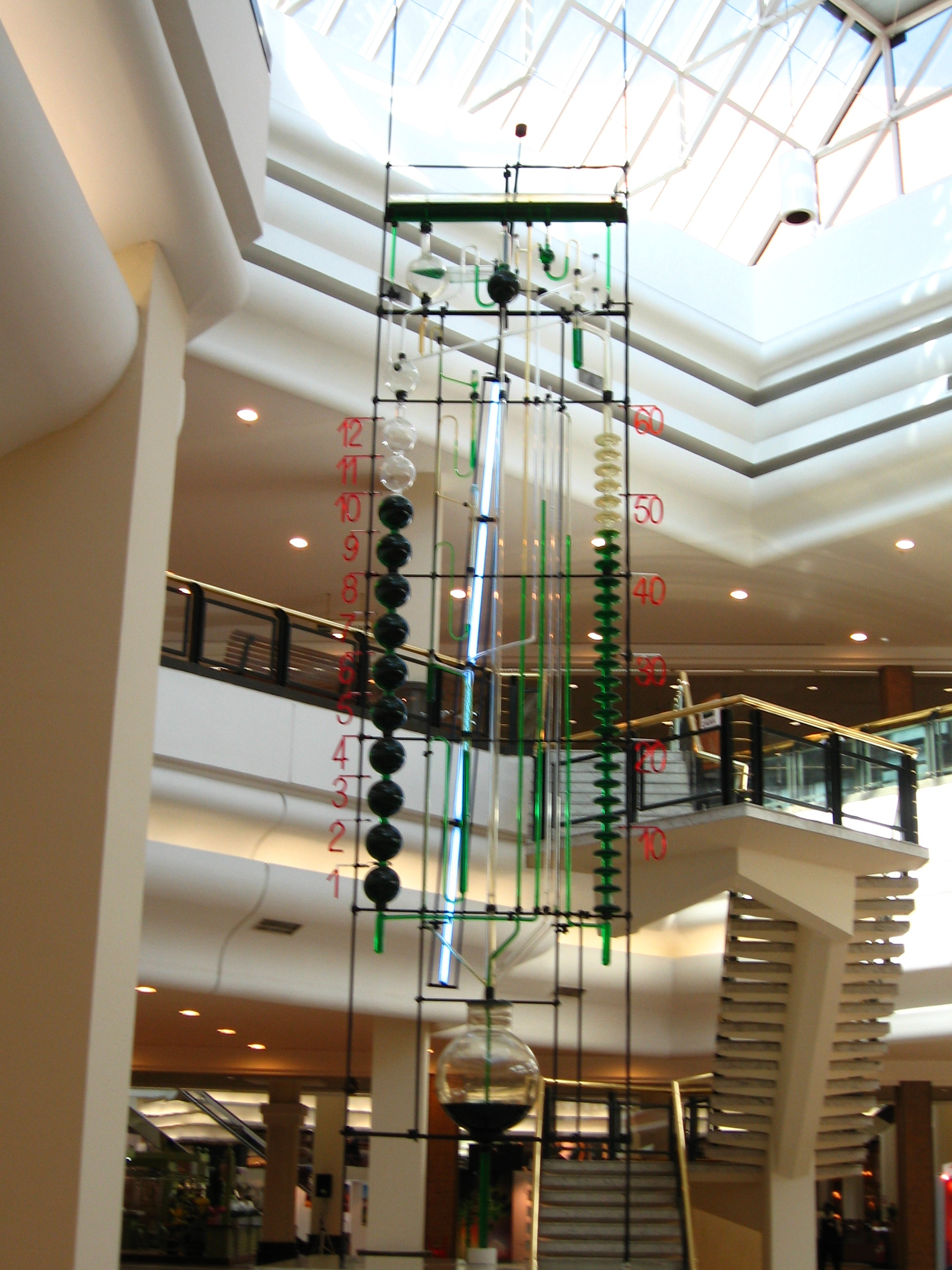
Clock at the Iguatemi Mall in Porto Alegre, Brazil.

He constructed "The Water Clock", at The Children's Museum of Indianapolis, "Clepsydra Water Clock" at Abbotsford, British Columbia, "Time Flow Clock" Europa Center, Berlin, and "Time-Flow Clock" Rødovre Centrum, Denmark. Also, he projected the Water Clocks displayed at the Iguatemi Mall in São Paulo city and the Iguatemi Mall in Porto Alegre, Brazil. The clock stands there since 1983.

One of his clocks was installed in the 1990s at Yabachō Station in Nagoya, Japan. In 2011 a Waterclock of Gitton was installed in the entrance hall of NEMO Science Museum in Amsterdam, in the Netherlands.
