= Frank Caplan =

American businessman

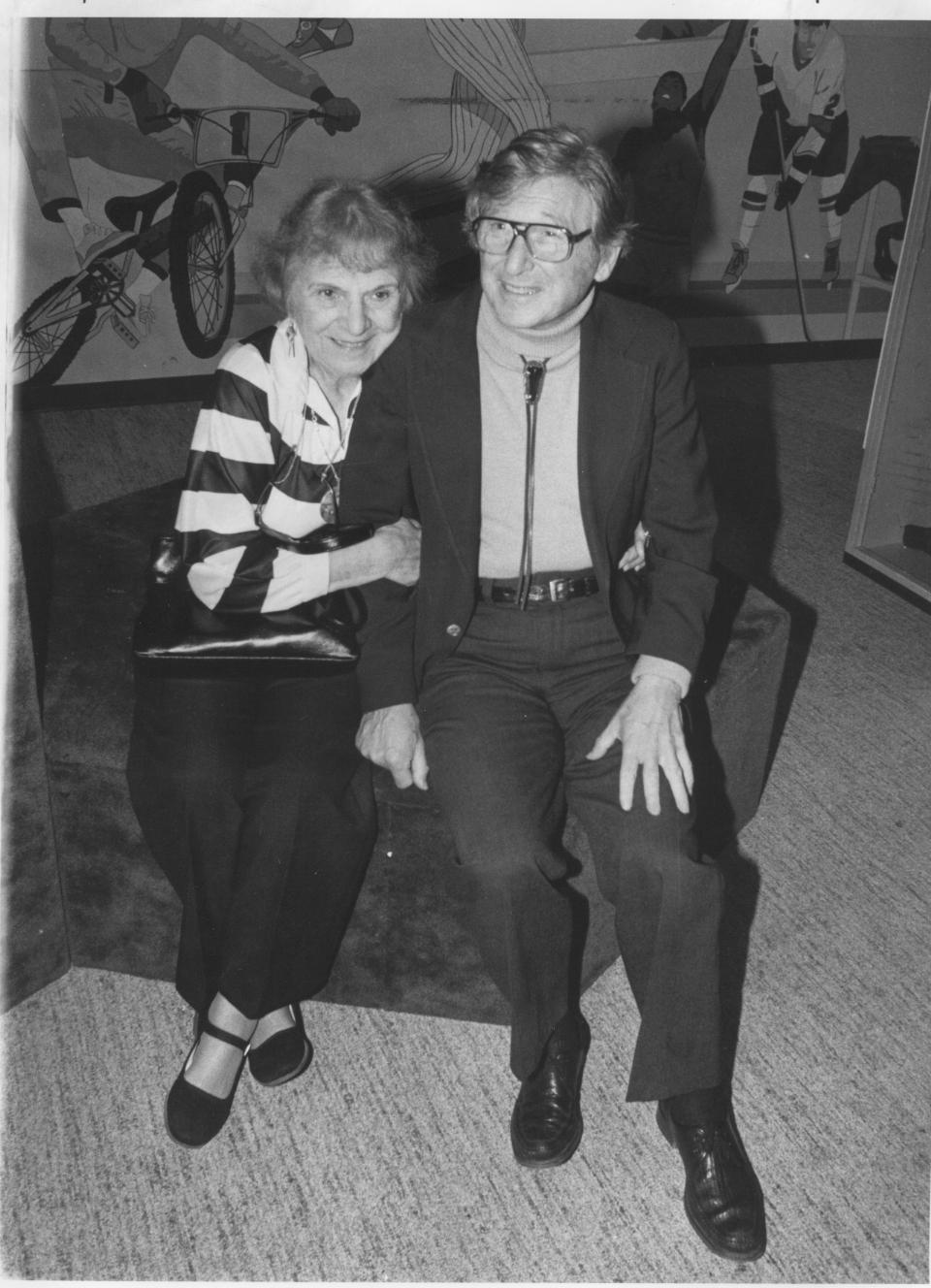
- Frank and Theresa Caplan
- Born: June 10, 1911; Kingston upon Hull, England
- Died: September 28, 1988 (aged 77); New Jersey, United States
- Occupations: Founder of Creative Playthings, Toy Developer, Educator, Author, Youth Worker
- Spouse: Theresa Caplan

Frank Caplan (June 10, 1911 – September 28, 1988) was a youth worker, educator, folk toy collector, and pioneer in developing and manufacturing educational toys for children. He co-founded Creative Playthings in 1945 with his wife Theresa, and worked with artists, architects, and designers, such as Isamu Noguchi, Louis Kahn, Henry Moore, Robert Winston, and the Swiss toymaker, Antonio Vitali, to create innovative educational play objects and playground designs for children. By the 1950s, Creative Playthings had gained international recognition and expanded to become one of the most important manufacturers and suppliers of materials for early childhood education. In 1975, Frank Caplan founded The Princeton Center for Infancy and Early Childhood. He researched and co-authored a national bestselling series on early childhood development with Theresa Caplan, which included, The First Twelve Months of Life (1977), The Second Twelve Months of Life (1978), and The Early Childhood Years: The 2 to 6 Year Old (1983). Together they also co-authored The Power of Play (1973). He was one of the first male nursery school teachers in the U.S. and together with Theresa Caplan collected over 50,000 American and international folk toys, folk art, and contemporary playthings, which in 1984 the couple donated to The Children's Museum of Indianapolis for a permanent gallery on folk, fantasy, and play.

== Education and youth work ==
Frank Caplan was born in Kingston upon Hull, England, on June 10, 1911, to Russian Jewish parents. In 1914, his family immigrated to the United States and settled in Harlem, New York. He graduated from DeWitt Clinton High School in 1927 and began attending City College of New York at night. After graduating in 1931 with a bachelor's degree in sociology and history, he took a job as the director of the Block Recreation Project, working with street gangs to create club centers for leadership training. His interest in toys began when working as one of the first male nursery school teachers in the U.S. under Caroline Pratt, founder and director of City and Country School in Greenwich Village, New York City. Later, he worked at the Jewish Center in Far Rockaway, Long Island (along with his future wife, Theresa Caplan, and artist, Mark Rothko), where he made puppets and simple playthings for children. In 1934, he set up a cooperative farm-camp for city children.

On May 30, 1934, Frank Caplan married Theresa Caplan (b. Kupferberg, June 6, 1913 – April 13, 2010). In 1936, he received his master's degree in the Philosophy of Education from Teachers College, Columbia University and began work as Senior Project Supervisor of the Works Progress Administration (WPA) Youth Service Division of the New York City Board of Education, a novel experiment to develop education programs for 16- to 25-year-olds living in economically distressed areas of New York City.

== Research and publications ==
In 1975, Frank and Theresa Caplan co-founded The Princeton Center for Infancy and Early Childhood, a pioneering organization that researched and prepared books and pamphlets for parents and professionals. The center authored The Parenting Advisor (1977), Parents' Yellow Pages (1978), and Growing Up Years: Your Child's Record Keeping Book (1978). Frank and Theresa co-authored The Power of Play (1973), The First Twelve Months of Life (1977), The Second Twelve Months of Life (1978), and The Early Childhood Years: The 2 to 6 Year Old (1983), which covered the mental, physical, language and social development of early childhood with advice for parents and answers to common concerns. The series was praised for embracing both mothers and fathers, as well as supporting diverse family types.

== Folk toy collecting ==
In the 1950s, Frank and Theresa Caplan began collecting folk toys on their numerous international travels. Their casual collecting grew into more formal collecting of folk toys from around the world in the hopes of establishing a Museum of Fantasy and Play. In 1984 they donated their collection of over 50,000 folk toys, folk art, and contemporary playthings to The Children's Museum of Indianapolis. The collection, now known as the Caplan Collection, was first used in the exhibit "Passport to the World."

Frank Caplan died on September 28, 1988. Theresa Caplan died on April 13, 2010, survived by their daughter, Judith Inglese, and son, Richard Caplan.

== Selected works ==
- Caplan, Frank and Theresa Caplan. "The Value of Play for Learning." Theory into Practice, Vol. 13, No. 4 (October 1974): 239–243.
- Caplan, Frank and Theresa Caplan. The First Twelve Months of Life: Your Baby's Growth Month By Month. New York: Bantam, 1995 (Orig. published 1977). ISBN 0-553-57406-X.
- Caplan, Frank and Theresa Caplan. The Second Twelve Months of Live: Your Baby's Growth Month By Month, 15th Edition. New York: Bantam, 1982 (Orig. published 1978). ISBN 0-553-26438-9.
- Caplan, Frank and Theresa Caplan. The Early Childhood Years: The 2 to 6 Year Old. New York: Bantam, 1984 (Orig. published 1983). ISBN 0-553-26967-4.
- Caplan, Frank and Theresa Caplan. The Power of Play. Norwell, MA: Anchor Press, 1974. ISBN 0-385-09935-5.
- Caplan, Frank. "Extending Educational Service to Autonomous Groups of Unemployed Youth." Journal of Educational Sociology, Vol. 19, No. 9 (May 1946): 546–554.
- Caplan, Frank. "Block Recreation Project." Journal of Educational Sociology, Vol. 7, No. 8 (April 1934): 516–520.
