= Electrolytic cell =

Cell that uses electrical energy to drive a non-spontaneous redox reaction

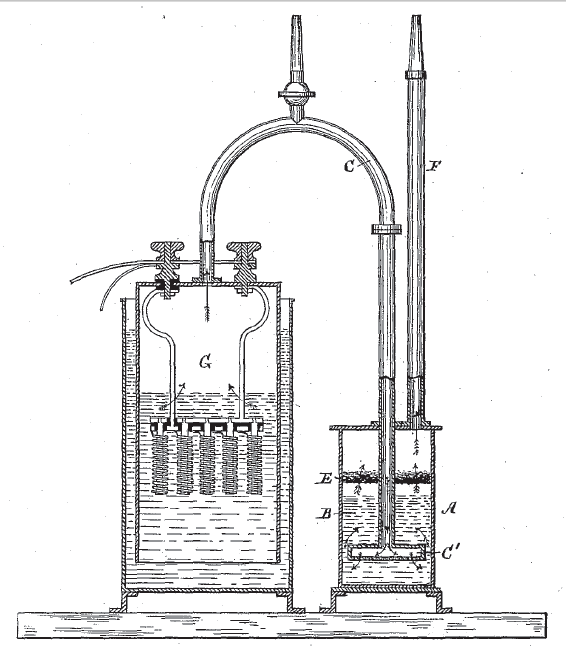
Nineteenth-century electrolytic cell for producing oxyhydrogen

An electrolytic cell is an electrochemical cell that uses an external source of electrical energy to drive a non-spontaneous chemical reaction, a process known as electrolysis. In the cell, a voltage is applied between the two electrodes—an anode (positively charged) and a cathode (negatively charged)—immersed in an electrolyte solution. This contrasts with a galvanic cell, which produces electrical energy from a spontaneous chemical reaction and forms the basis of batteries. The net reaction in an electrolytic cell is a non-spontaneous (Gibbs free energy is positive), whereas in a galvanic cell, it is spontaneous (Gibbs free energy is negative).

== Principles ==
In an electrolytic cell, a current passes through the cell by an external voltage, causing a non-spontaneous chemical reaction to proceed. In a galvanic cell, the progress of a spontaneous chemical reaction causes an electric current to flow. An equilibrium electrochemical cell exists in the state between an electrolytic cell and a galvanic cell. The tendency of a spontaneous reaction to push a current through the external circuit is exactly balanced by a voltage so that no current flows. If this voltage is increased, the cell becomes an electrolytic cell, and if it is decreased, the cell becomes a galvanic cell.

An electrolytic cell has three components: an electrolyte and two electrodes (a cathode and an anode). The electrolyte is usually a solution of water or other solvents in which ions are dissolved. Molten salts such as sodium chloride can also function as electrolytes. When driven by an external voltage applied to the electrodes, the ions in the electrolyte are attracted to an electrode with the opposite charge, where charge-transferring (also called faradaic or redox) reactions can take place. Only with an external voltage of correct polarity and sufficient magnitude can an electrolytic cell decompose a normally stable, or inert chemical compound in the solution. The electrical energy provided can produce a chemical reaction that would otherwise not occur spontaneously.

Michael Faraday defined the cathode of a cell as the electrode to which cations (positively charged ions, such as silver ions Ag^{+}) flow within the cell, to be reduced by reacting with electrons (negatively charged) from that electrode. Likewise, he defined the anode as the electrode to which anions (negatively charged ions, like chloride ions Cl^{−}) flow within the cell, to be oxidized by depositing electrons on the electrode. To an external wire connected to the electrodes of a galvanic cell (or battery), forming an electric circuit, the cathode is positive and the anode is negative. Thus positive electric current flows from the cathode to the anode through the external circuit in the case of a galvanic cell.

== Applications ==
A video describing the process of electrolytic reduction as used on Captain Kidd's Cannon at The Children's Museum of Indianapolis

Electrolytic cells are often used to decompose chemical compounds, in a process called electrolysis—with electro meaning electricity and the Greek word lysis means to break up. Important examples of electrolysis are the decomposition of water into hydrogen and oxygen, and bauxite into aluminum and other chemicals. Electroplating (e.g., of copper, silver, nickel, or chromium) is done using an electrolytic cell. Electrolysis is a technique that uses a direct electric current (DC).

Commercially, electrolytic cells are used in the electrorefining and electrowinning of several non-ferrous metals. Most high-purity aluminum, copper, zinc, and lead are produced industrially in electrolytic cells.

As already noted, water, particularly when ions are added (saltwater or acidic water), can be electrolyzed (subjected to electrolysis). When driven by an external source of voltage, hydrogen (H^{+}) ions flow to the cathode to combine with electrons to produce hydrogen gas in a reduction reaction. Likewise, hydroxide (OH^{−}) ions flow to the anode to release electrons and a hydrogen (H^{+}) ion to produce oxygen gas in an oxidation reaction.

In molten sodium chloride (NaCl), when a current is passed through the salt the anode oxidizes chloride ions (Cl^{−}) to chlorine gas, it releases electrons to the anode. Likewise, the cathode reduces sodium ions (Na^{+}), which accepts electrons from the cathode and deposits them on the cathode as sodium metal.

Sodium chloride that has been dissolved in water can also be electrolyzed. The anode oxidizes the chloride ions (Cl^{−}), and produces chlorine (Cl_{2}) gas, and, depending on the pH of the solution, can produce Hypochlorous acid. However, at the cathode, instead of sodium ions being reduced to sodium metal, water molecules are reduced to hydroxide ions (OH^{−}) and hydrogen gas (H_{2}). The overall result of the electrolysis is the production of chlorine gas at the anode, aqueous hypochlorous acid as the anolyte, hydrogen gas at the cathode, and aqueous sodium hydroxide (NaOH) as the catholyte. Industrially, this is known as the chloralkali process.

== See also ==
- Electrolysis
- Electrochemical cell
- Galvanic cell
