= Fireworks of Glass Tower and Ceiling =

Blown glass sculpture in Indianapolis

Coordinates: 39.81073°N 86.15734°W

Fireworks of Glass
- Material: Glass, aluminium, steel.
- Size: 43 ft.; 18,000 lb.
- Created: 2006, Dale Chihuly
- Present location: The Children's Museum of Indianapolis
- Identification: 2006.1.1 (tower), 2006.1.2 (ceiling)

Fireworks of Glass Tower and Ceiling, also known as Fireworks of Glass, is a blown glass sculpture installation in the permanent collection of The Children's Museum of Indianapolis located in Indianapolis, Indiana, United States. The tower sits on a glass base, a pergola ceiling, and rises through the center of the museum's spiraling ramp system. Created by Dale Chihuly in 2006, it is his second-largest permanently installed glass sculpture. Beneath the tower is an accompanying exhibit that describes the sculpture and the process by which it was made. The tower and pergola ceiling are two distinct accessioned objects in the Children's Museum's collection.

== Description ==
Fireworks of Glass and Pergola Ceiling is a 43-foot tower composed of 3,200 pieces of red, yellow, and cobalt blue blown glass and a pergola ceiling made up of 1,600 pieces of multicolored glass. On the tower, two to four feet pieces of twisted glass are situated on a metal armature suspended by steel cables. The tower rests on a glass plate over a pergola ceiling filled with other pieces of glass. Each piece of glass was individually blown by a team of glassblowers based out of Chihuly's studio in Tacoma, Washington.

The installation is made up of the main tower, which is composed of Horny and Gooseneck-shaped glass pieces, and the pergola ceiling, an area underneath the artwork that serves as the ceiling for the Fireworks of Glass exhibit in the lower level of the museum. The ceiling includes 1,600 pieces of glass in some of Chihuly's favourite shapes such as Putti, Seaforms, and Persians. Other shapes represented in the ceiling are Gooseneck, Mexican hat, twisted horn, split leaf, sea tube, frog foot, starfish, and horn bale.

=== Exhibit ===
An interactive exhibit is located on the lower level of the museum below the pergola ceiling where the tower rests. Visitors can sit on circular, rotating benches in order to look up at the pergola ceiling and observe the colours, shapes, and the light interacting with the glass. The exhibit includes hands-on elements that allow visitors to build towers using plastic pieces of coloured shapes. Computer kiosks walk the user through the glassblowing process.

== Acquisition ==
After discussions with Children's Museum CEO Dr. Jeff Patchen in June 2001, Chihuly began sketching ideas for the tall, vertical space within the museum's ramp system. It took Chihuly and his team five years to plan and create Fireworks of Glass, which was inspired by the idea of an upside down chandelier. The sculpture cost a total of $4.5 million. The sculpture was unveiled on Saturday, 18 March 2006. Indianapolis Mayor Bart Peterson said of the installation, "This one of a kind work of art will serve as an icon for cultural tourism for our city."

=== Installation ===
Installation of the sculpture began in January 2006. Under the direction of Chihuly, a team of glassblowers created the 4,800 glass pieces in Tacoma, Washington before shipping them to Indianapolis in 350 cardboard boxes. After completion of the glass base, three artists from Chihuly's team and six museum collections staff began carefully adding the glass pieces to the metal armature. A plastic tube was inserted into each piece of glass to protect it when placed on the armature and to hold it securely to the metal rods. It took 14 days for all 4,800 pieces of glass to be installed, 1,600 in the pergola ceiling and 3,200 in the tower. The team worked from the bottom of the tower to the top, using ladders and scaffolding as they went. They followed design plans created by Chihuly, but also had the freedom to make design decisions on site, depending on the surrounding museum environment.

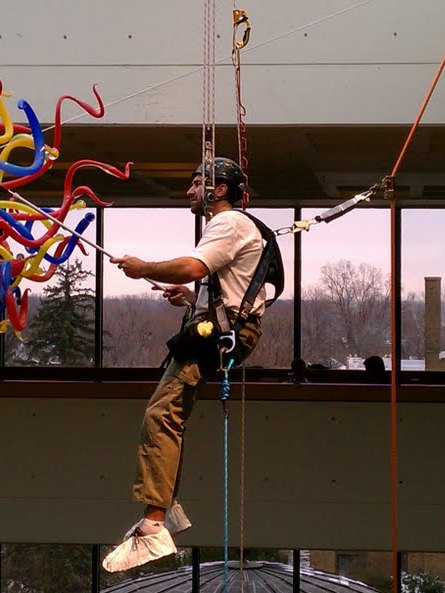
A contractor is suspended from the ceiling in order to clean the artwork.

== Maintenance ==
Over time, dust settles on the sculpture and dulls its color. Professionals come into the museum each month to dust the tower in order to restore it to its original color. Hanging from the ceiling, they are able to rappel down and reach every piece of glass. Museum staff also clean the base and lower glass pieces on a weekly basis.

== Artist ==
Glass is the most magical of all materials. It transmits light in a special way ... I'm pleased that my art appeals to so many people of all ages. As a parent and an artist, I'm especially looking forward to leaving a legacy at The Children's Museum, a place where I hope my work brings joy to children who visit from all over the world

— Dale Chihuly,

== See also ==
- DNA Tower
- List of works by Dale Chihuly
