= Clock of Flowing Time =

Water clock in Berlin, Germany

Coordinates: 52.50444°N 13.33889°E

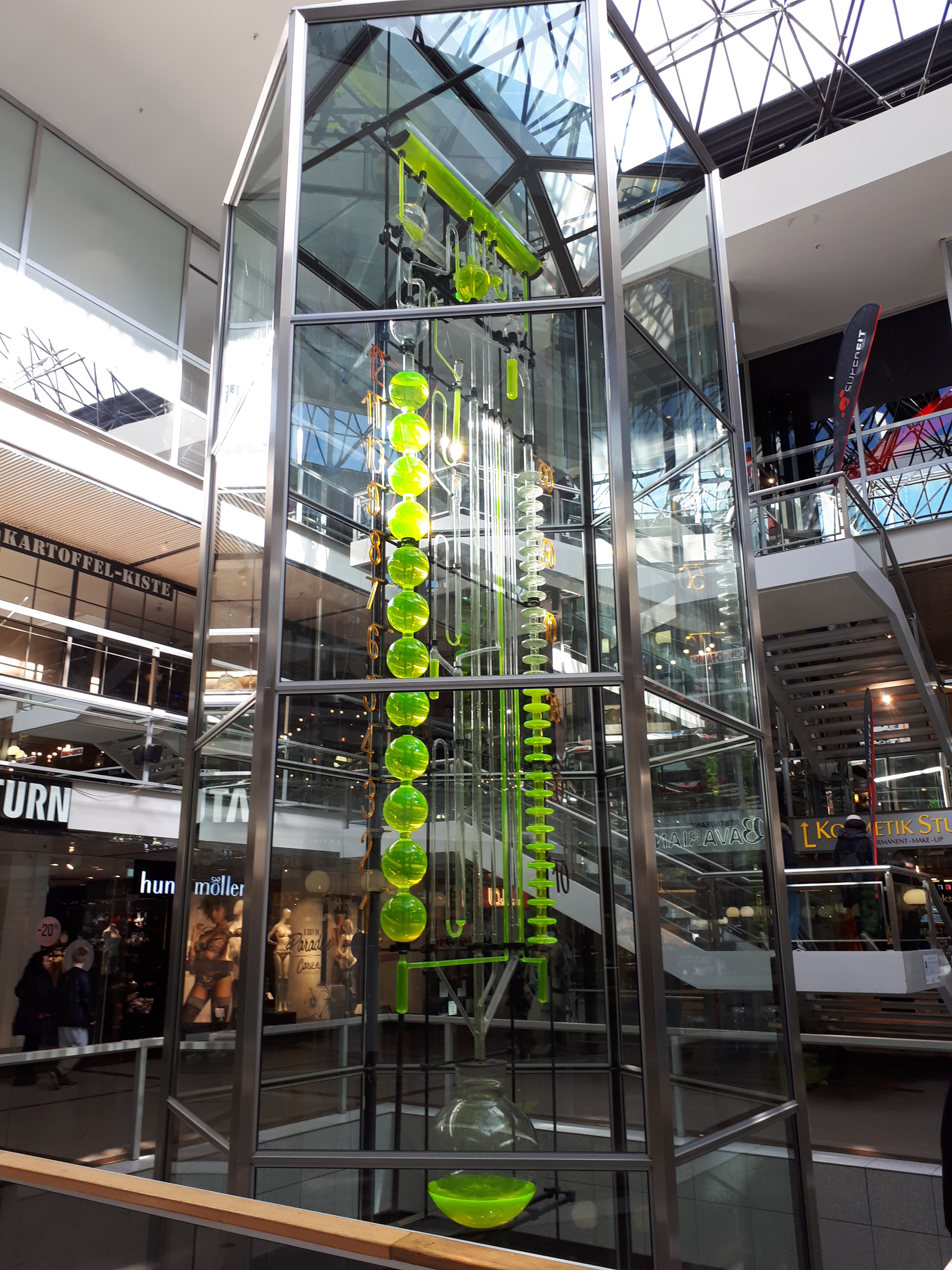
The Clock of Flowing Time in Berlin

The Clock of Flowing Time (German: Uhr der fließenden Zeit) is a 13 metres (43 ft) high water clock extending over three floors in the Berlin Europa-Center. The clock was designed by the French artist Bernard Gitton and set up in 1982.

The water clock displays the time by filling glass spheres with brightly colored liquid, in a cycle that repeats every 12 hours. The whole system is controlled by a pendulum swinging in the lower half of the clock.
