= Reuben Wells =

Steam locomotive in Indiana

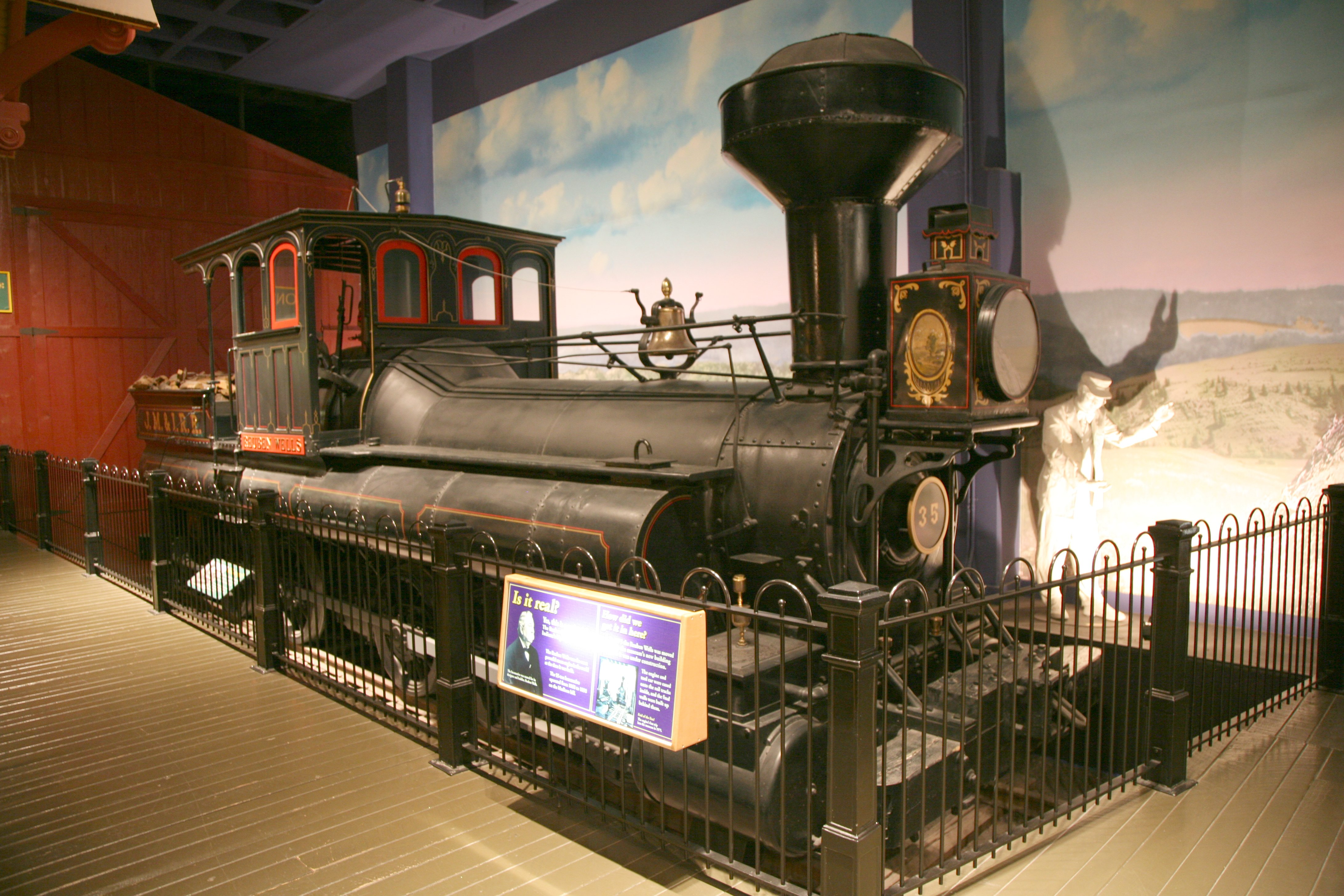
Type and origin
- Power type: Steam
- Designer: Reuben Wells
- Builder: JM&I shops, Jeffersonville, IN
- Build date: August 1868
Specifications
- Configuration
  - Whyte: 0-10-0T
  - UIC: E n2t
- Gauge: 4 ft 8 1/2 in (1,435 mm) standard gauge
- Length: 35 ft (10.67 m)
- Loco weight: 55 short tons (49 long tons; 50 t)
- Fuel type: Wood
Career
- Operators: Jeffersonville, Madison and Indianapolis Railroad
- Locale: Madison, Indiana
- Retired: 1898
- Current owner: The Children's Museum of Indianapolis
- Disposition: static display

Indiana Register of Historic Sites

The Reuben Wells is a steam locomotive in the permanent collection of The Children's Museum of Indianapolis located in Indianapolis, Indiana, United States. Beginning in 1868, it operated for 30 years in Madison, Indiana, pushing train cars up the steepest "standard-gauge main-track grade" in the United States.

== Description ==
The Reuben Wells is a helper locomotive that was built in 1868. It was designed to push train cars up the 5.89% incline of Madison Hill in Madison, Indiana, the steepest segment of 4 ft 8 1/2 in (1,435 mm) standard gauge main-track in the United States. Weighing 55 short tons (49 long tons; 50 t), it was the most powerful locomotive in the world at the time. It is 35 feet (10.67 m) long. The locomotive is named after its designer, engineer Reuben Wells.

== Historical information ==
The Reuben Wells was made specifically for Madison Hill, Indiana, a 1.3-mile (2.1 km) long stretch of track that is known for having the steepest regular incline in the United States. The Jeffersonville, Madison and Indianapolis Railroad tried many different methods to get train cars up the hill. The couplers used to connect the train cars were not strong enough to withstand being pulled up the hill, making it necessary for the cars to be pushed. Initially a team of horses was used to pull the train cars up the hill. Following this, a cogwheel system was in use for about twenty years. The Reuben Wells was the first steam engine to work the grade by adhesion alone, pushing the cars up the hill as well as supporting them on the descent starting in 1880.

The Reuben Wells was completed in the railroad shops in 1868, and quickly proved to be a success leading to the creation of a second locomotive in 1869 named M. G. Bright. In 1886 Reuben Wells was shortened by 5 feet with the last pair of driving wheels removed and a new saddle tank placed atop of the boiler. She would continue pushing train cars up Madison Hill for twelve more years before she was retired in 1898. She stayed in reserve for another seven years before it was retired permanently and sent to Purdue University in 1905. Upon arriving at Purdue University, she was rebuilt back to her original configuration of an 0-10-0T. In the years that followed the Reuben Wells was included in several exhibitions, including the Chicago World's Fair in 1933–34 and the Chicago Railroad Fair in 1948–49. Afterward, she remained in Pennsylvania at Penn Central Transportation Company railroad yards. In 1968, the Reuben Wells was brought back to Indiana, where she was placed on permanent display at the Children's Museum of Indianapolis.

=== Acquisition ===
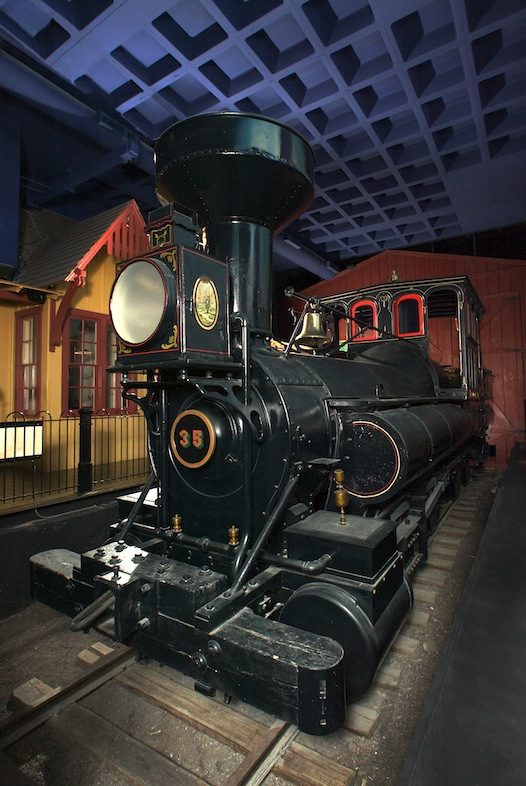
Reuben Wells from the proper left

In 1966, Tom Billings, head of the Children's Museum advisory board, learned that the Reuben Wells was being kept in storage in Pennsylvania. On a vacation to Washington and Williamsburg, Billings decided to stop by to see the Reuben Wells. After he saw her, he started trying to get the Reuben Wells to be permanently back in Indiana, specifically at the Children's Museum. Billings contacted Otto Frenzel, a member of the Pennsylvania Railroad board of directors, who disclosed that the railroad company was currently trying to find museums for its steam locomotives. At the time, the Reuben Wells was already promised to a museum in St. Louis. Advocates pointed out that the St. Louis museum was already getting several pieces, and St. Louis had no historical connection to the engine. The campaign was successful, and in May 1967, the Pennsylvania railroad president, Allen Greenough, announced that the Reuben Wells was coming to Indiana. She was shipped from Pennsylvania to Indiana on flatcars.

The Reuben Wells entered Indianapolis with much fanfare on June 11, 1968. A parade was organized to escort the locomotive on the last leg of its journey, accompanied by the Central Indiana Council Boy Scout band and a motorcycle motorcade. The parade made its way down 38th Street and south on Meridian Street before turning into the Children's Museum. After successful fund-raising efforts from the Indiana Junior Historical Society and the Children's Museum Guild, the Reuben Wells was installed in a new train shed on the museum campus the next year. The train was moved into the new building in 1976, where it remains on view on the museum's lower level. Originally acquired as a permanent loan, the Reuben Wells is now within the permanent collection of the Children's Museum.

== See also ==
- 0-10-0
- John Bull locomotive
