= Water clock (Indianapolis) =

Artistic clock in Indianapolis

The Water Clock
- The Water Clock inside The Children's Museum of Indianapolis
- Material: Glass, steel, and a solution of deionized water, methyl alcohol, and coloring dye
- Size: Approx. 30 ft.
- Created: Bernard Gitton, 1988, France
- Present location: The Children's Museum of Indianapolis
- Identification: 88.191.1

The Water Clock, also known as The Giant Water Clock, is in the permanent collection of The Children's Museum of Indianapolis located in Indianapolis, Indiana, United States. The modern water clock is located in the Sunburst Atrium of The Children's Museum, and is adjacent to the Grand Staircase leading up to the second floor. It was created by French scientist and artist Bernard Gitton in 1988, the same year that the museum acquired it.

The 26.5-foot (8.1 m) artistic timepiece is the largest water clock in North America.

== Description ==
The water clock, created by French chemist and artist Bernard Gitton, is approximately 30 feet (9.1 m) tall and made of more than 40 pieces of glass and 100 pieces of metal. The lights on the clock are bright green and the water is dyed blue. The clock is made of glass, steel, and 70 US gallons (260 L) of a solution of deionized water, methyl alcohol, and coloring dye.

It was assembled in France to ensure that it worked, then disassembled and shipped to Indianapolis. It was assembled again in the Children's Museum over two weeks time.

=== Process ===
Functionally, a Gitton water clock consists of four subsystems: An oscillator (the pendulum), a frequency divider, a minute counter (the minute discs), and an hour counter (the hour balls). Water from a pump in the basement, just below the clock, is pumped through a pipe running up the middle of the clock into a reservoir at the top. The water then drips down onto a scoop at the top which is connected to the green, swinging pendulum. The pendulum causes the scoop to dump the water into a series of siphons. The siphons fill and empty into the minutes' globes. A Siphon is a tube in an inverted "U" shape which causes the solution to flow up, without pumps, powered by the fall of the liquid as it flows down the tube under the pull of gravity. One minute globe represents two minutes. When all thirty-minute globes are full, they empty and an additional hour globe fills. Twice a day, at one o'clock, all of the hour globes and minute discs are full and the water empties until only the first hour globe is left full.

To read the clock the viewer finds the number of filled "hour" spheres lining the left side of the clock and the number of filled discs on the "minutes" side of the clock, with each disc equaling two minutes.

Moving water makes a siphon -\ You will not see it pull \ 'Til it reaches to the minutes' sphere \ And makes the water flow.
At every single hour \ When the minutes' side is full \ The "minutes matching" U-tube burps: \ Another siphon pulls.

— Mark Coovert and Peggy Powis, interpretive poem,

== Maintenance ==
The water clock has two pumps in the basement – one that keeps the clock working, and a backup in case the first fails. The 70 US gallons (260 L) of fluid in the clock is not pure water. It is composed of deionized water (to keep it electrically non-conductive), coloring (to make the water easier to see), and methyl alcohol (to keep bacteria from growing in the clock). The color of the water can be changed by stopping the clock, draining the water, and replacing it with water of the new color.

== Artist ==
The water clock was created by Bernard Gitton, a French physical chemist and artist who combines those two studies by creating water clocks, water calculators, fountains, and other items of art and science. Bernard began making items of artistic science in 1979, at the age of 43, when he left the world of research science to create scientific art.

== See also ==
- Hornsby Water Clock
