= Antonio Vitali =

Swiss toy designer and maker

Antonio Vitali (1909–2008) was a Swiss toy designer and maker known for creating handmade wooden toys. In addition to his own workshop in Zurich, Switzerland, he also had a long relationship as toy designer with the U.S. toy company, Creative Playthings.

== Early life ==
Antonio Vitali was born in 1909 to middle class Italian and Swiss parents. He studied under the well-known Swiss sculptor, Otto Münch, and at the Bauhaus-inspired Zurich School of the Applied Arts (Kunstgewerbeschule) in the late-1920s. After living the Bohemian artist's life and studying at private art academies in Paris in the 1930s, he moved back to Bern, Switzerland to enter the Swiss army. During this time, he migrated from the life of a sculptor to that of a professional photographer. It was only in 1938 that Vitali revisited his dream of living independently as a sculptor. The outbreak of the Second World War caused Vitali to be drafted into the Swiss Army; however, he was fortunate as he was able to serve near his home in Gütighausen, guarding the bridge over the river Thur. This dark cloud did reveal a silver lining as this left him with enough time to design furniture for a local carpenter's shop, as well as make toys for his own children. As a result of a chance encounter with the owner of a workshop in Zurich, "Werkstube Zurich," He was offered a job, and in 1942, Vitali moved with his small family to Zurich. At the Werkstube, he did not earn enough money to support his family and decided to turn his hobby into a job, designing and producing toys.

== Early career ==
When asked what really motivated him to develop toys, Vitali said, "I became a father at a young age and wanted to buy my children their first toys The squeaky, mostly horrible looking rubber animals and celluloid rattles that were sold at that time did not satisfy me. Anyhow, money was a commodity lacking to a young starving sculptor. I was handy and so I started making my own toys." Although adults found his toys not realistic enough, he observed that children were completely enthralled and fascinated by his creations. His abstract figures challenged children's imagination.

In 1944, Vitali opened his workshop and store in the old town of Zurich at Neumarkt 4. He primarily worked with Larch wood from the Engadin area of Switzerland. His first efforts included furniture, pull ducks, wooden trains, barns and doll cradles. This was the beginning of the Vitali legacy of producing hand carved, carefully rounded toys that evolved from his observation of how his own children play. After the end of the war, he formed a business relationship with Switzerlands' most important toy store, Franz Carl Weber (FCW). The relationship with FCW eventually ended as Vitali realized that his toys sold better in toy stores and crafts stores where customers could be properly advised and were willing to pay a bit more for a high quality, hand-crafted product. As a result, he formed a business relationship with the toy specialist, Pastorini and the Swiss national crafts store, "Heimatwerk". His strategy proved to be a success and his toys became a critical and financial success. As a result of his toys being highlighted by the Swiss artist and architect Max Bill, in the book "FORM" about contemporary design the American toy producer Creative Playthings discovered him. The relationship with Creative Playthings opened new mass-production possibilities. However, Vitali wanted to differentiate the beautiful yet mass-produced wooden toys from his own studio creations and suggested that the toys be called "Playforms" for the U.S. market. This was in 1954.
