= Captain Kidd's cannon =

Shipwrecked cannon

- Material: Iron
- Size: Muzzle diameter: 27 cm (11 in); Trunnion-to-trunnion width: 44 cm (17 in); Diameter at cascabel: 39 cm (15 in).
- Discovered: 2007

Captain Kidd's cannon is an iron cannon that was discovered in 2007 off of the coast of Catalina Island in the Dominican Republic. The cannon is believed to be part of the wreckage of the Quedagh Merchant, a ship that was commandeered and later abandoned by Captain Kidd in 1699. It is the first pirate cannon that has been recovered from the Caribbean. It's one of 26 cannons found off the coast of Catalina Island. It was first taken to Indiana University's School of Health, Physical Education, and Recreation for investigation and research before being displayed in the exhibit National Geographic: Treasures of the Earth at The Children's Museum of Indianapolis in Indianapolis, Indiana.

== Description ==
The cannon is made entirely of iron and weighs approximately 680 kilograms (1,500 lb). The cannon muzzle is 27 centimeters (11 in) in diameter. The width of the trunnion is approximately 44 centimeters (17 in). The diameter of the cascabel is approximately 39 centimeters (15 in). The length of the cannon itself is approximately 209 centimeters (82 in). Upon retrieval from the ocean, the cannon was encrusted with coral and the salt water had caused rusting and deterioration.

== Recovery and conservation ==
A video describing the process of electrolytic reduction used in a display at The Children's Museum of Indianapolis within the Treasures of the Earth exhibit. The video describes the electrolytic process as it is occurring on Captain Kidd's Cannon, which is on display and currently undergoing the electrolytic process.

The cannon was found about 70 feet (21 m) off the coastal waters of Catalina Island in the Dominican Republic. The cannon was only 10 feet (3.0 m) below the surface of the water. After it was extracted from the ocean, the cannon was transported to Indiana University to be studied. Initial investigations of the coral encrusted on the cannon allowed scientists to better understand the dynamics of the 1699 wreck of the Quedagh Merchant. It is believed that the ship, once abandoned by Kidd, was looted and then set adrift and ablaze down the Río Dulce. An underwater science laboratory conducted electrolytic conservation treatments to remove salt from the years of immersion in the ocean. Indiana University will construct a mold of the cannon and make museum-quality, exact reproductions which will be sent back to the Dominican Republic for development of a land-based exhibit on shore by the shipwreck. The cannon continued to undergo the electrolytic conservation treatment when it arrived at the Children's Museum of Indianapolis for the National Geographic Treasures of the Earth exhibit. Following the discovery, Indiana University has designated the site a "Living Museum in the Sea."

The cannons, anchors, and wreckage from the Quedagh Merchant were first discovered by a local man who reported what he had found to the Dominican Republic's government. The government made a request to Charles Beeker who has been conducting research in the Dominican Republic for nearly twenty years and his research team at Indiana University to investigate and examine the remains. Beeker, the director of the Office of Underwater Science at Indiana University has been authorized to bring the cannon to his laboratory for five years for conservation and observation.
