= Europa-Center =

Building complex in Berlin, Germany

Coordinates: 52°30′16″N 13°20′20″E

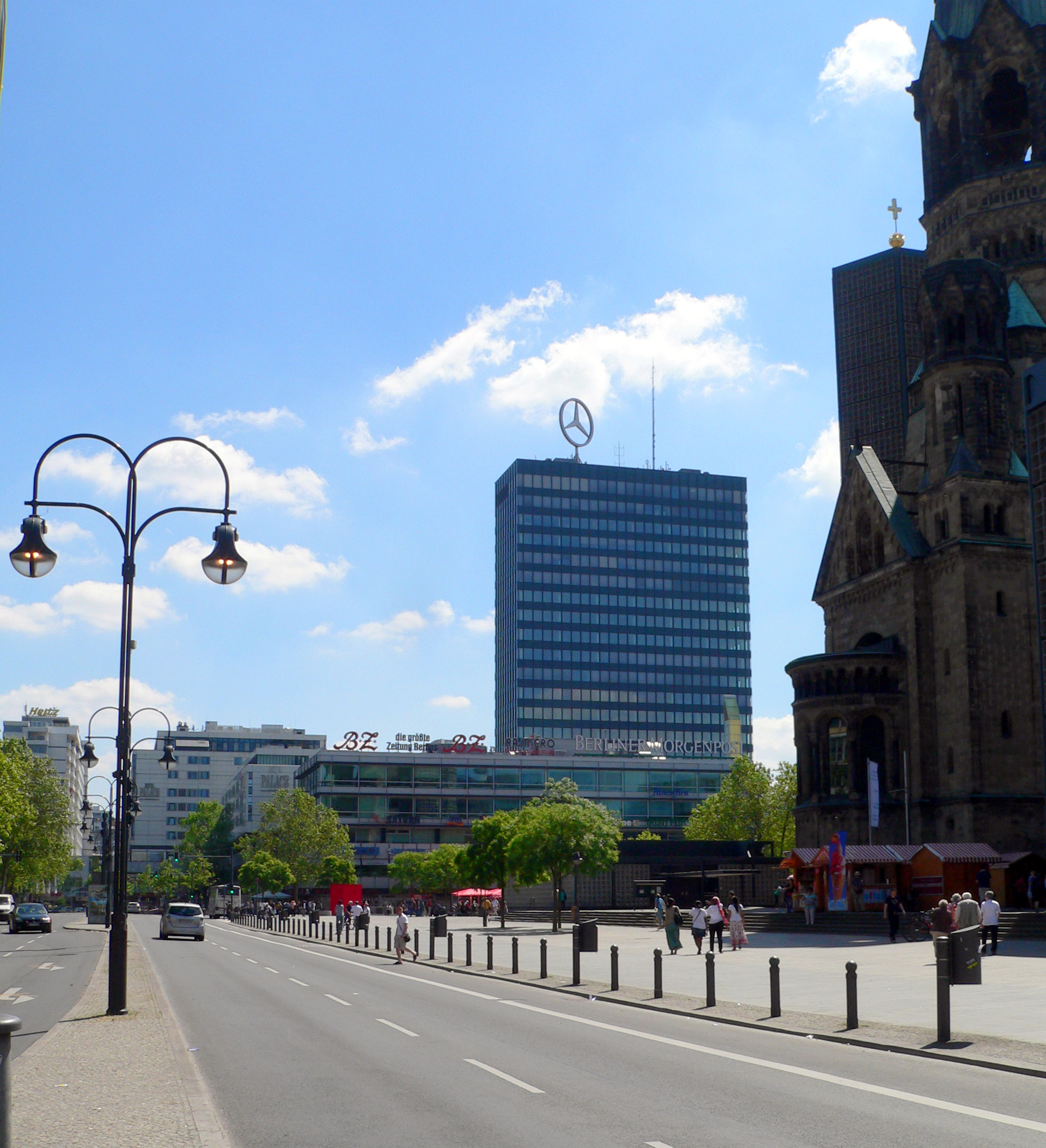
Breitscheidplatz with Europa-Center

The Europa-Center is a building complex on Breitscheidplatz in the Charlottenburg district of Berlin, with a shopping mall and a high-rise tower 86 metres (282 ft) tall. Built between 1963 and 1965, by 2003 it had been designated as a historically preserved building.

== History of the site ==
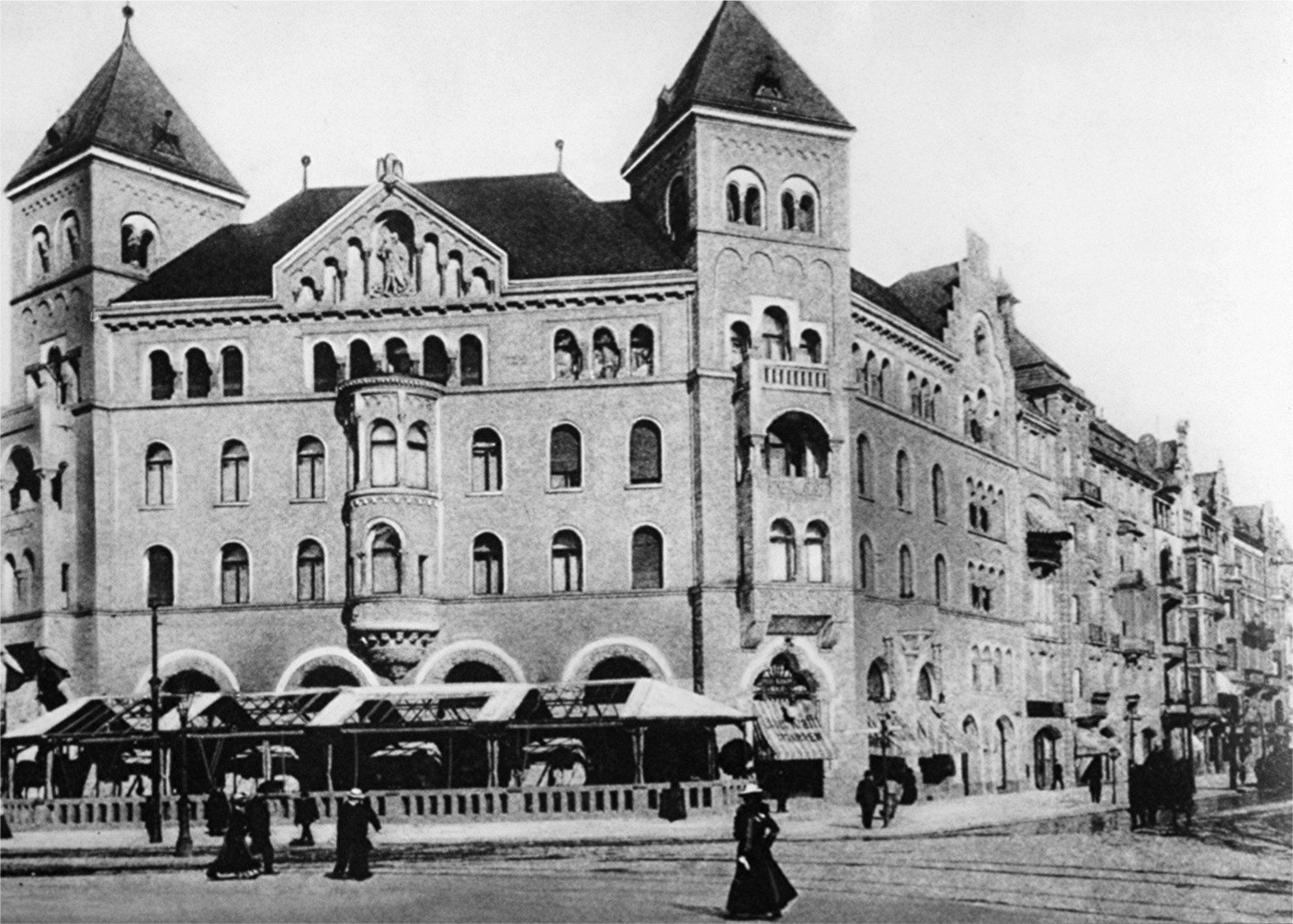
Romanisches Haus about 1900

From 1897 a residential building was erected at the site of the present-day Europa-Center, vis-à-vis the Kaiser Wilhelm Memorial Church and likewise designed in a Neo-Romanesque style according to plans by Franz Schwechten. Then part of Berlin's fashionable "New West" (today also known as "City West"), it was, from 1916, home to the Romanisches Café, a popular meeting place for writers, artists and people in the theatre business, as well as those who aspired to join them.

During an RAF air raid in World War II on the night of 22/23 November 1943, the building burnt down and lay in ruins. After the war, the cleared premises were used only intermittently for more than a decade, according to need. Makeshift constructions were used variously by wrestlers, circus performers and missionaries, followed by food outlets and briefly a cinema hosting so-called Sittenfilme ("films of manners"). A local newspaper described the central site as a "stain on Berlin's calling card".

== Construction ==
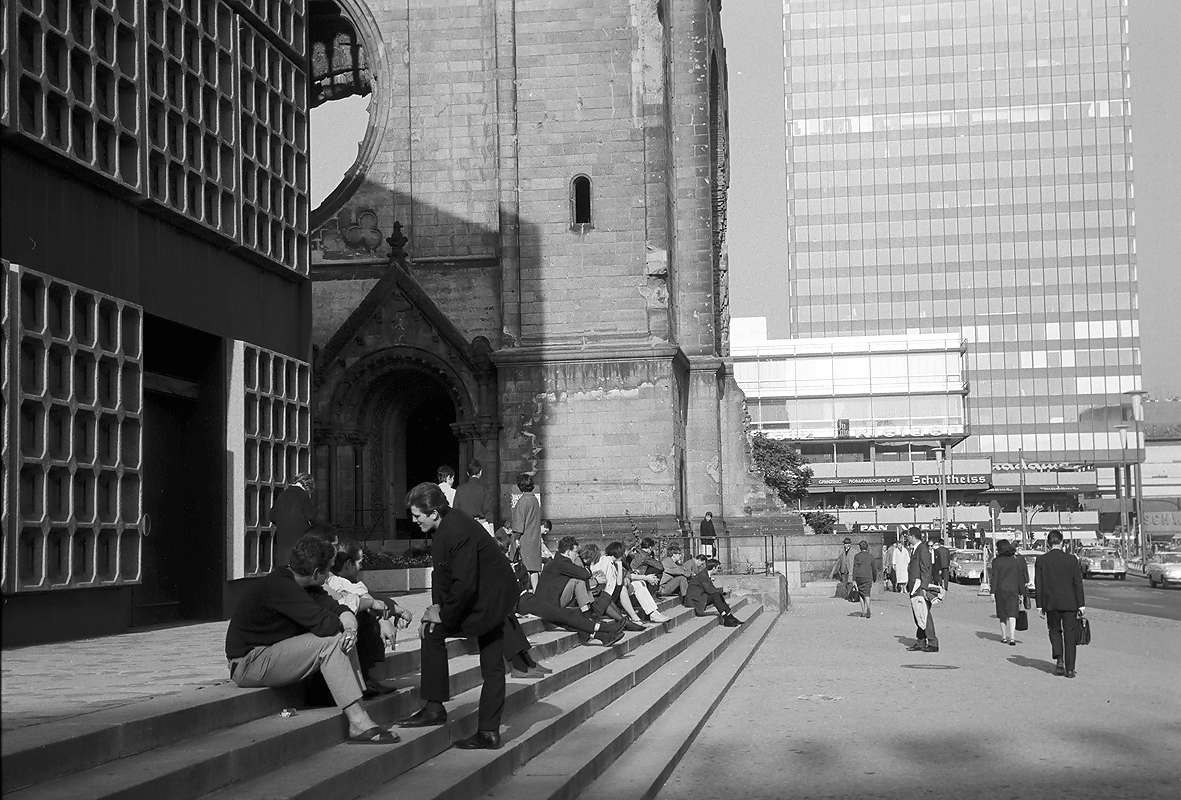
Memorial Church and Europa-Center, 1965

Soon after the division of the city by the construction of the Berlin Wall, in 1961, the situation changed. Upon the reconstruction of the Memorial Church, the West Berlin businessman and investor Karl Heinz Pepper was appointed to oversee the redevelopment of the Breitscheidplatz' eastern side. He commissioned the architects Helmut Hentrich and Hubert Petschnigg to design and build an office and shopping complex modelled on American malls. Construction work began in 1963, with artistic consulting by the church architect Egon Eiermann, and on 2 April 1965 the Europa-Center was inaugurated by Governing Mayor Willy Brandt.

What had been built was a complex with a total floor space of 80,000 square metres, divided into distinct units: a two-storey foundation with a basement and two inner courtyards, a cinema, a hotel, an apartment block, and the box-shaped 86m high-rise, then the highest in Berlin, with 21 storeys and 13,000 square metres of office space. In 2005 the operators of the complex gave the number of shops and food outlets as around 100.

== Notable features ==
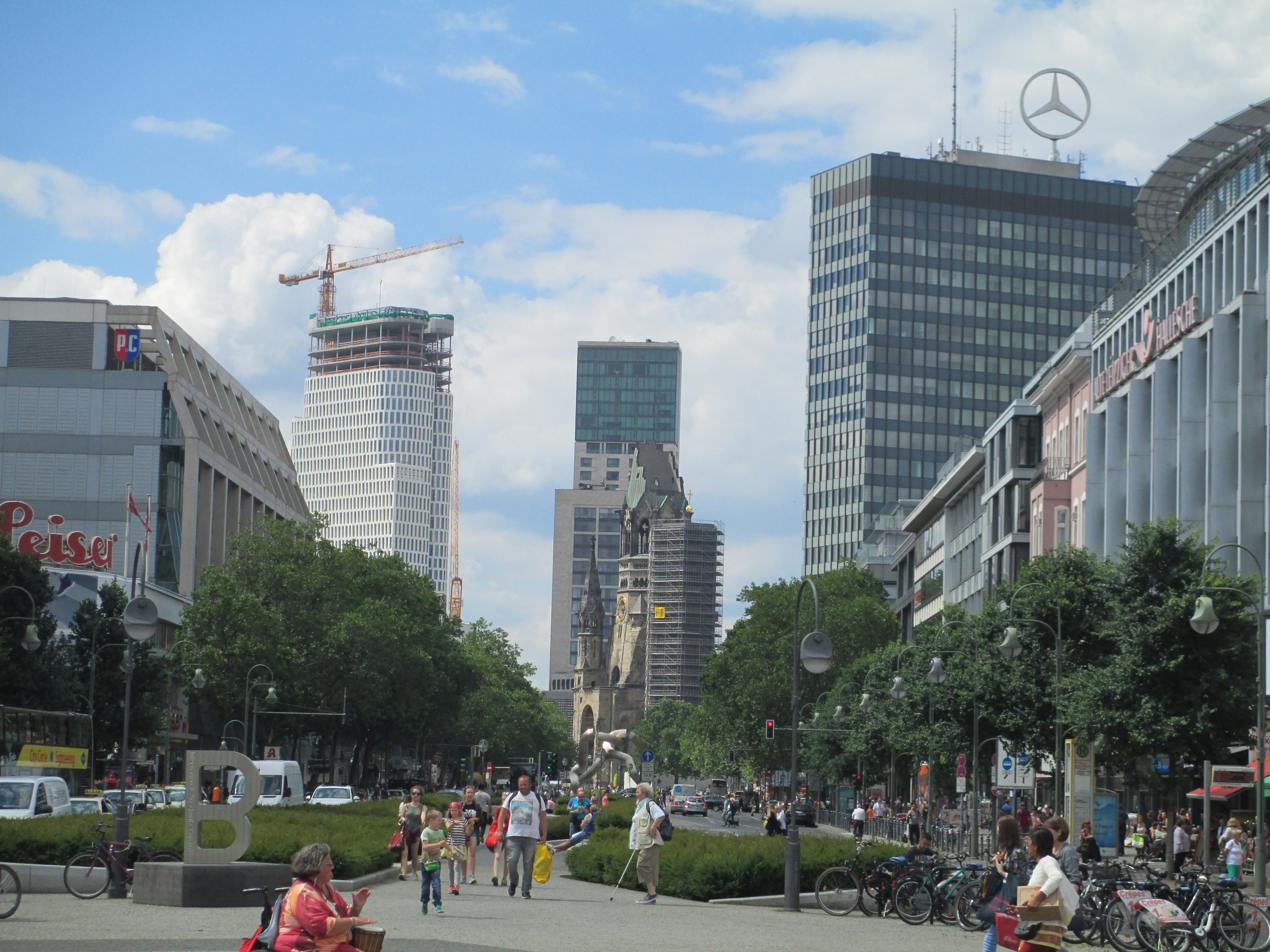
View from Tauentzienstraße

On top of the high-rise, and visible across Berlin, is a large metal star-in-a-circle symbol, the logo of car manufacturer Mercedes-Benz. It weighs 15,000 kg, has an outer diameter of 10 metres, completes approximately two revolutions a minute, and glows at night with the help of 681 fluorescent tubes. The shopping mall initially comprised an ice rink (closed in 1974) and the Royal Palast cinema, with the world's largest projection screen at the time of its opening in 1965 (closed in 2004). There was also an observation deck on the roof.

Today's major attractions include "The Clock of Flowing Time", a 13 metres (43 ft) high water clock of communicating vessels, and the Mengenlehreuhr originally located on nearby Kurfürstendamm. The basement is home to a Kabarett theatre and a large Irish pub.

The building features prominently in the 1966 spy film The Quiller Memorandum and in the 1981 biographical drama Christiane F.

Since 1965 the cabarett theatre Die Stachelschweine is in Europa-Center.

== See also ==
- List of tallest buildings in Berlin
