= The Children's Museum of Indianapolis =

Children's museum in Indianapolis, Indiana, US

Coordinates: 39°48′39″N 86°9′27″W

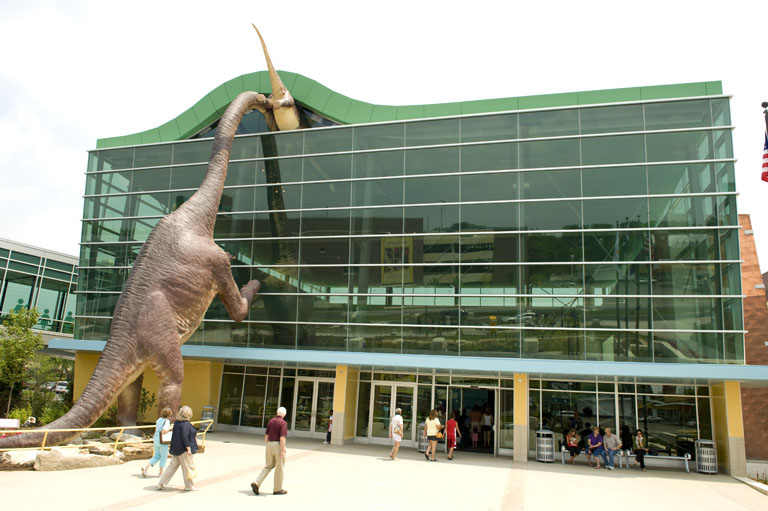
- Welcome Center and Brachiosaurus, installed in 2009
- Established: 1925; 101 years ago
- Location: 3000 North Meridian Street, Indianapolis, Indiana, 46208-4716, U.S.
- Type: Children's museum
- Visitors: 1.3 million (2019)
- President: Jennifer Pace Robinson
- CEO: Jennifer Pace Robinson
- Public transit access: Red Line, Purple Line, 18, 28, 30
- Website: www.childrensmuseum.org

The Children's Museum of Indianapolis is the world's largest children's museum. It is located at 3000 North Meridian Street, Indianapolis, Indiana, United States, in the United Northwest Area neighborhood of the city. The museum is accredited by the American Alliance of Museums. It is 472,900 square feet (43,933.85 m^{2}) with five floors of exhibit halls, and receives more than one million visitors annually. Its collection of over 130,000 artifacts and exhibit items is divided into two domains: Arts & Humanities and the Natural Sciences. Among the exhibits are simulated Cretaceous and Jurassic dinosaur habitats, a carousel, a steam locomotive, and the glass sculpture Fireworks of Glass Tower and Ceiling. The museum's focus is family learning; most exhibits are designed to be interactive.

Founded in 1925 by Mary Stewart Carey with the help of Indianapolis civic leaders and organizations, it is the fourth-oldest such institution in the world. The current site became home for the museum in 1946; the current building was constructed in 1976 and has had four major expansions since then. The museum hosts thousands of activities annually, including plays at the Lilly Theater, classes and workshops for school children, traveling exhibits, and fund-raising events. With a 2008 budget of $28.7 million, it has 400 employees and 1,500 volunteers. Its financial stability is ensured by a large endowment that was first established in the 1960s and is governed by a board of trustees. In May 2021, the museum announced Jennifer Pace Robinson, a 29-year veteran of the museum, as its new president and CEO.

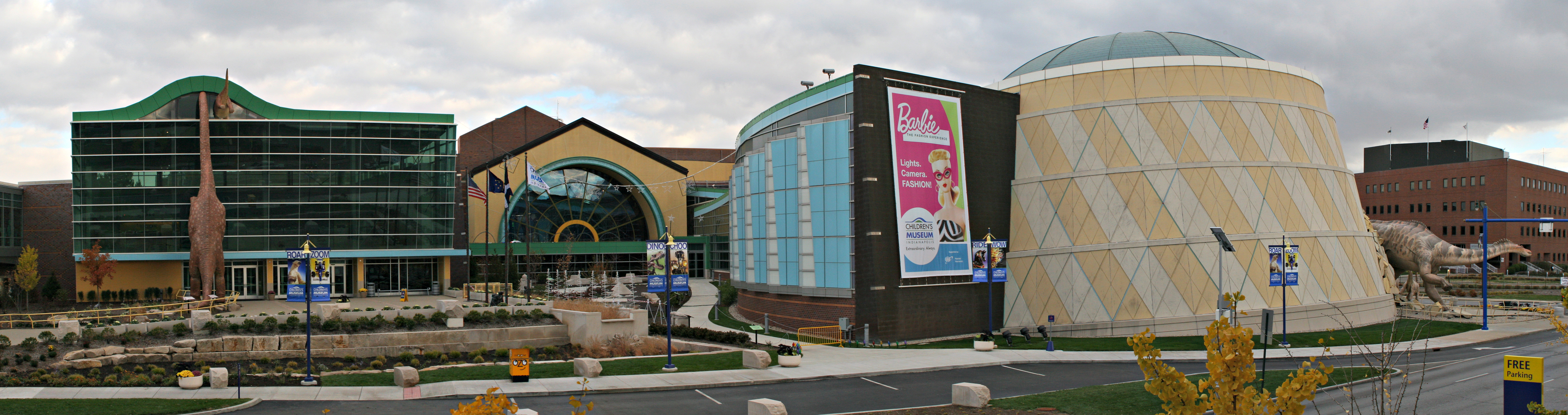
The museum exterior

== History ==
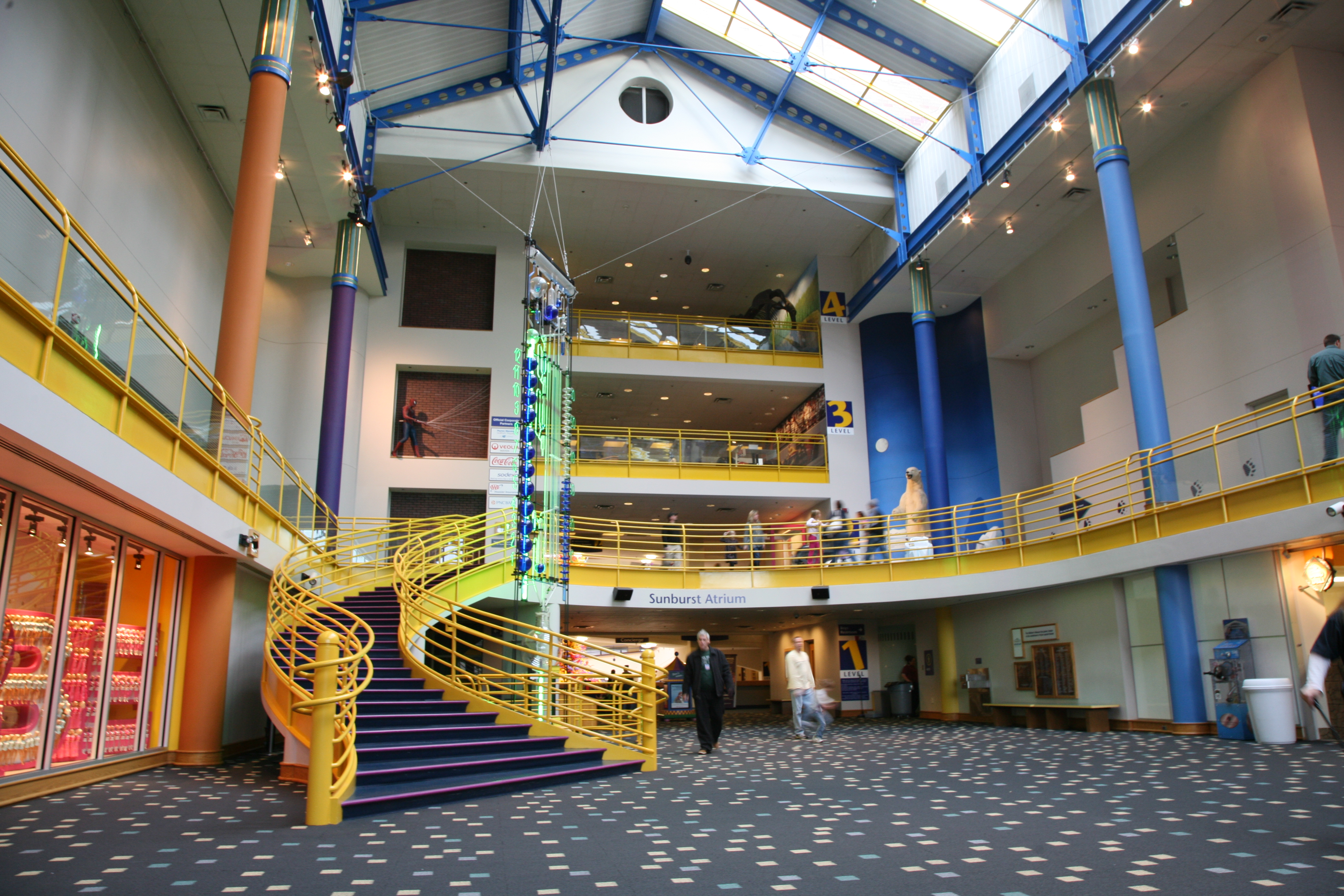
Museum lobby and atrium

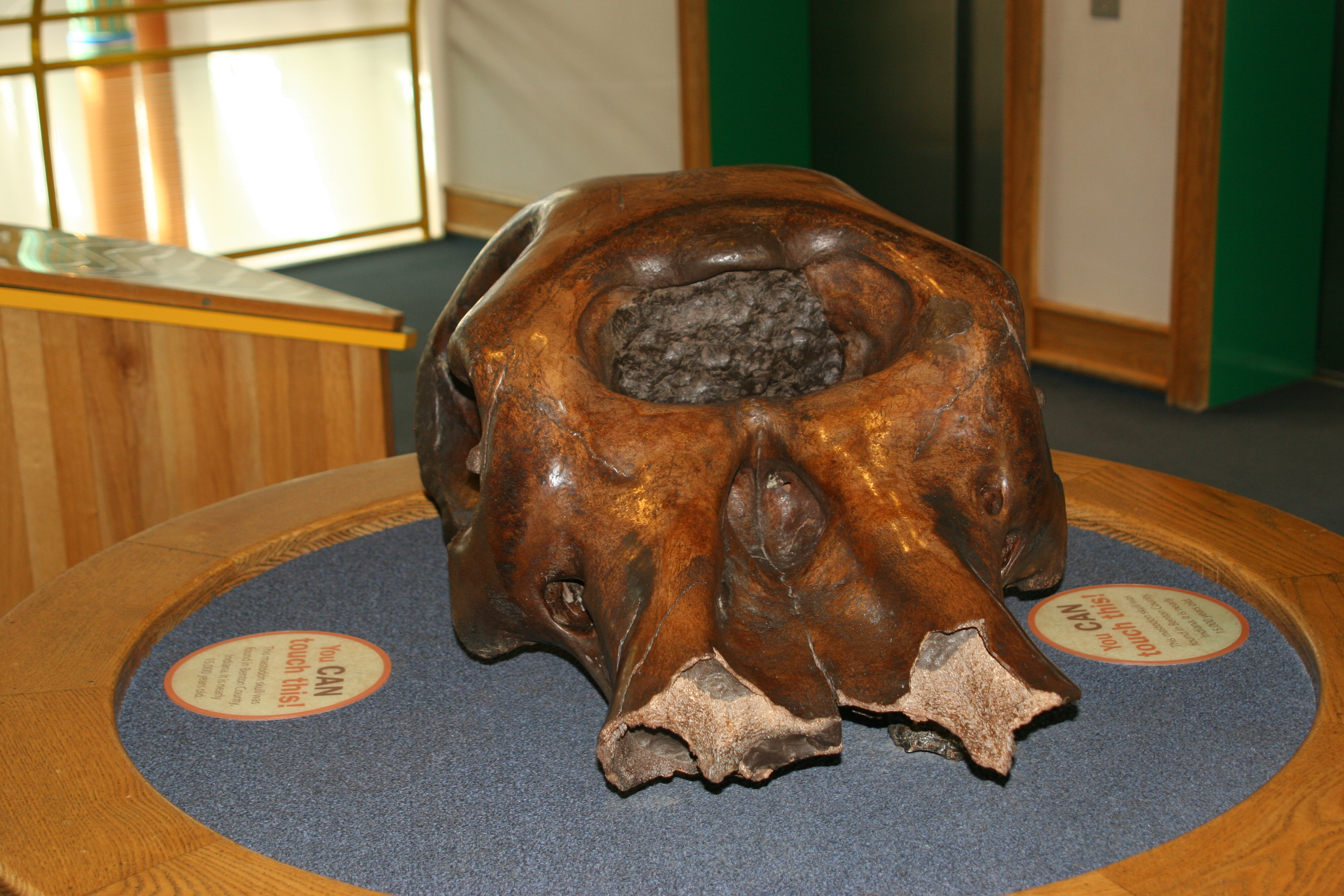
A mastodon skull exhibit. The museum encourages children to touch many of their exhibits, such as this one.

The Children's Museum of Indianapolis was founded in 1925 by Mary Stewart Carey, a wealthy civic patron who owned the Stewart-Carey Glass Company. She was inspired to create the museum after a 1924 visit to the Brooklyn Children's Museum. Carey began a campaign to start a children's museum in Indianapolis and enlisted the aid of other local civic leaders and the Progressive Teacher's Association. With their support, the museum opened in the carriage house of The Propylaeum, a local civic club. A board of trustees was established to manage the museum and Carey was elected its first president. The early exhibits were created and donated by school children. Carey sought a larger facility and after two moves, she finally located the museum in her own mansion on Meridian Street in 1926. The same year the first curator, Arthur Carr was hired. Carr arranged Carey's specimens into exhibits and managed the museum. The first permanent exhibits were marine, Japanese, pioneer, archeology, and nature. By the 1940s, a larger staff was hired and Carr became director after Carey's 1938 death. The museum began offering guided tours to school children, organized traveling exhibits that were moved around to area schools, and began hosting events for fundraising. Early members were given a Seahorse pin to identify them as Youth members.

In 1942, Carr retired from the museum and Grace Golden became the new director. Golden sought to further expand the museum and successfully solicited grants from the Indianapolis Foundation, the Lilly Endowment, and members of the Lilly family. She also secured several important corporate sponsorships. The new revenue allowed the museum to purchase its own building, a former mansion on North Meridian Street. Golden also began diversification of the museum's exhibits, rather than relying on local donations. She successfully created partnerships with other museums who loaned exhibits of Native American artifacts in 1947 and a gallery of dinosaur skeletons in 1949. The mummy Wenuhotep was given on permanent loan from the University of Chicago in 1959, a nineteenth-century log cabin was donated in 1961, and the Hall of Man was added in 1962. Several new permanent exhibits were created during her tenure, focusing on pioneer life, natural science, and ethnography. Golden also established a Junior Docent program, created two weekly television shows for local broadcast, and began a program of interpretive activities.

In 1964, Golden resigned and was succeeded as director by Mildred Sartor Compton. Compton remained director until 1982. She created the first long-term financial plans for the museum by establishing an endowment and began advertising campaigns for donations and to increase attendance. The museum was enhanced to help it earn accreditation from the American Alliance of Museums by standardizing and cataloging its exhibits and archives and implementing conservation techniques. New permanent exhibits were obtained during Compton's tenure including the Physical Science Gallery in 1967, the Reuben Wells Steam Engine in 1968, and the Model Train Gallery in 1970.

A fundraising drive held in 1973 raised $8.7 million and allowed construction of the current museum building. The old museum was demolished and the new one built on its site. Finished in 1976, the new museum had modern conservation and storage facilities, classrooms, the 350-seat Ruth Allison Lilly Theater, and a much larger five-floor exhibit area. New exhibits and attractions were added for the grand opening, including a carousel, a simulated cavern, and a mastodon skeleton.

Peter Sterling became director in 1982 and continued to pursue a growth policy for the museum. A restaurant and outdoor garden gallery were added in 1983, and in 1984, the Caplan folk art collection of 50,000 items was donated by Frank and Theresa Caplan, nearly doubling the number of items owned by the museum. The museum also undertook a $14 million, multi-phase expansion that included construction of a welcome center and atrium entrance (completed in 1983), a planetarium, and an additional exhibit hall, completed in 1988. Indianapolis architect Evans Woollen III designed the four-story atrium addition. A grant from Lilly Endowment funded the construction of the Eli Lilly Center for Exploration in 1990.

By 1992, the museum was hosting 4,000 programs and activities annually and had an annual attendance of 835,000 patrons. It employed 165 full-time employees, 227 part-time employees, and 850 volunteers. Revenue in 1992 was $12.4 million.

In 1996, a 310-seat large-format theater called the CineDome was constructed adjacent to the museum. In 2004, the museum added a 950-space parking garage and the CineDome was converted to Dinosphere, which is built within and around the former CineDome. The Welcome Center was expanded again in 2009 increasing the total size of the museum to 472,900 square feet (43,930 m^{2}).

The museum's current president and CEO, Jennifer Pace Robinson, was hired in 2021, replacing Jeffrey H. Patchen, who had been hired in 1999, after serving as a Senior Program Officer at the J. Paul Getty Museum.

== Operations ==
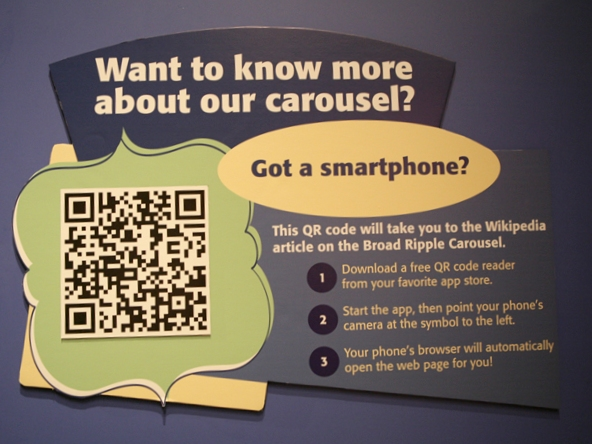
Label using a QRpedia code to direct visitors to the Wikipedia article Broad Ripple Park Carousel

In 2008, the institution had revenue of $26.37 million and expenses of $26.369 million, with over half its income being supplied by the museum's endowment. The facility had more than one million visitors in 2008. Field trips from 775 schools brought more than 83,000 students to the museum during 2008. In 2010, the museum had 400 part and full-time employees. Additionally, 1,500 individuals contribute over 65,000 hours of volunteer work annually.

The museum has five floors of exhibit halls in the main building. There are several smaller structures around the main building including Dinosphere, a theater, and an outdoor sports park. In total, the museum has 472,900 square feet (43,933.85 m^{2}) of floor space. The museum has a collection of over 130,000 artifacts, divided into two areas: Arts & Humanities and Natural Science.

To maintain a regular change in its exhibits, significant emphasis is placed on research and development. Field experts are consulted regularly to assess the exhibits and offer proposals for new ones. The museum employs many experts who are leaders in their field of study. Because of its leadership and innovations, the museum is a world leader in its field. Child and Parents magazine have both ranked the museum as the best children's museum in the United States. The "institution is considered the gold standard of museums for children." It was cited by the New York Times as an example of a cultural institution that is ensuring awareness of the need to accommodate visitors with sensory issues is built in from the start of an exhibition's design.

The museum employed a Wikipedian in Residence, appointed in August 2011, and has some QRpedia codes posted for visitors to read Wikipedia articles about objects in the collection, translated into their preferred language. QRpedia codes are located in the All Aboard! exhibit which directs users to the Reuben Wells steam engine Wikipedia article, and in the Carousel Wishes and Dreams exhibit, which links to the Broad Ripple Park Carousel article.

== Exhibits ==
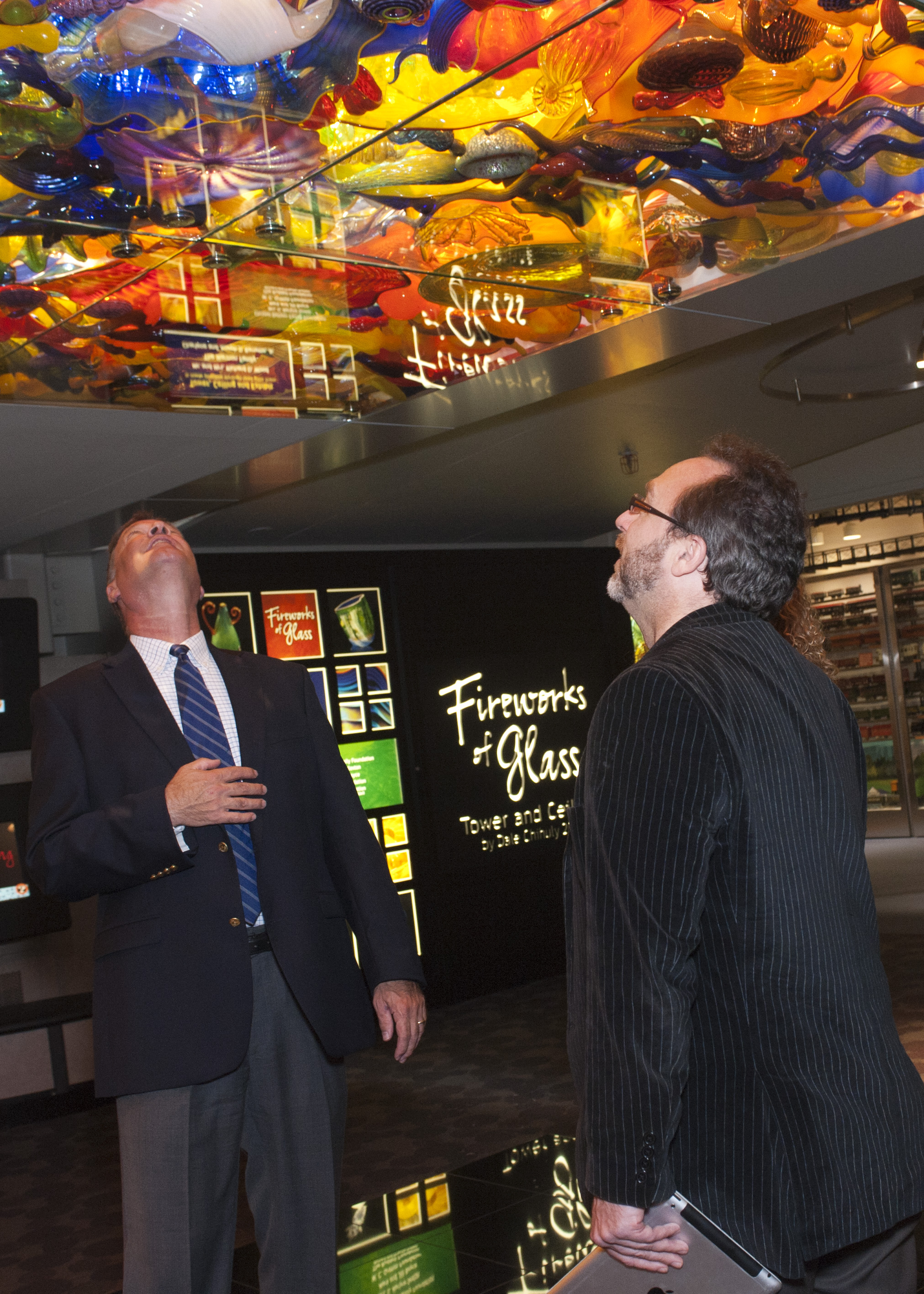
Jimmy Wales and The Children's Museum of Indianapolis CTO David Donaldson observe the ceiling portion (or underneath) of the Dale Chihuly sculpture Fireworks of Glass Tower and Ceiling.

The main stairwell of the museum is a giant spiral ramp that allows visitors to access all five levels of the museum by strollers, wheelchairs, and walkers. In 2006, glass artist Dale Chihuly installed a four-story glass sculpture inside the central atrium of the giant spiral ramp. The sculpture is called Fireworks of Glass Tower and Ceiling and is accompanied by an exhibit of Chihuly's glass blowing methods.

=== Lower level ===
The National Geographic: Treasures of the Earth exhibit, which includes three areas, is located on the Lower Level of the museum and was first opened on June 11, 2011. One area contains ancient Egyptian artifacts presented in a replica of the tomb of Seti I. Another area has a simulated archeological dig where artifacts about Ying Zheng, the first Emperor of China, were discovered. The third area features underwater archaeology through a Dominican Republic shipwreck of Captain Kidd and cannons from it. At the back is a working lab.

The Beyond Spaceship Earth gallery opened in 2016 and is about technology and daily life of NASA's space stations, as well as featuring an Indiana Astronaut Wall of Fame.

The "All Aboard!" Gallery features an 11,000-pound (5,000 kg) steam engine designed by Reuben Wells in 1868 to conquer Indiana's Madison Hill. The engine is attached to a Pennsylvania Railroad tool car in the museum's "All Aboard!" Gallery. This exhibit is currently closed for renovations and set to reopen in fall 2026.

The lower level also hosts the Lilly Theater.

=== Main floor ===
On the main floor/ground level, the museum has the Welcome Center with adult and juvenile Brachiosaur sculptures climbing into the front. These sculptures are physiologically accurate to current paleontological knowledge and were created by Gary Staab and painted by Brian Cooley who created the sauropod sculptures which are crashing out of the Dinosphere. Outside the museum on this level is the Seven Wonders of the World garden, a green rain garden, parking garage, and the oversize parking lot to accommodate large parties of visitors such as schools on field trips.

A focal point of the ground level of the museum is North America's largest water clock, created by French physicist and artist Bernard Gitton. The main floor contains the museum's toy store and food court. The volunteer center, concierge desk, and birthday party rooms are also on this level.

=== Second floor ===
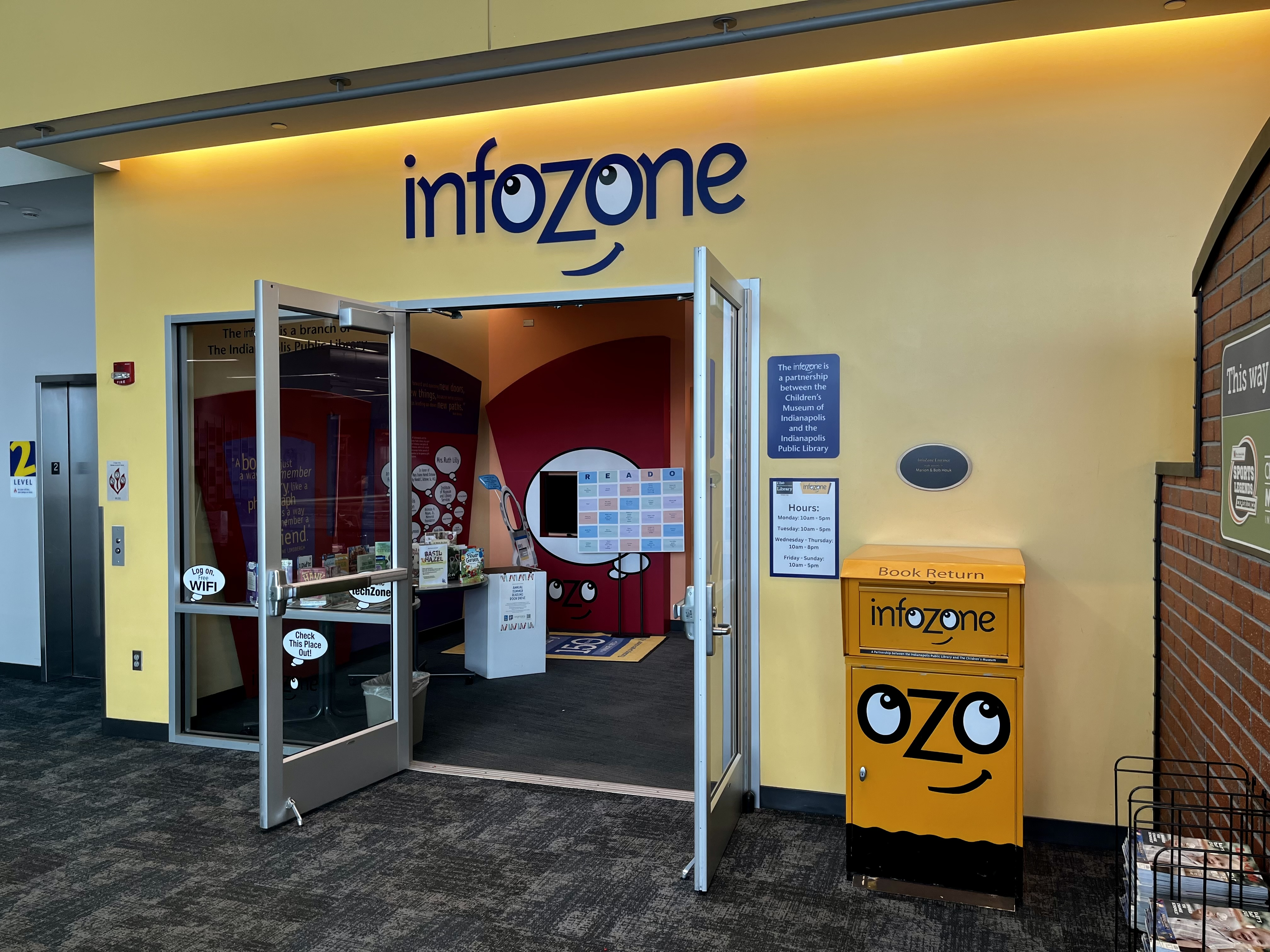
InfoZone branch in 2023

The museum also contains a 3,000-square-foot (280 m^{2}) branch of the Indianapolis Public Library called the InfoZone. During the latest expansion in 2009, this space was moved to the second floor outside of the skywalk which links the parking garage to the main building.

The second level hosts many of the museum's temporary exhibits. The only semi-permanent exhibit on the level is the "Take Me There" gallery. The "Take Me There" exhibit has its content changed periodically with a different culture represented in the space every four to five years. In 2009, the exhibit "Take Me There: Egypt" was featured. "Take Me There: China" and "Take Me There: Greece" have since then taken its place, in May 2014 and June 2019 respectively. "Take Me There: Peru" opened on July 12, 2025. Also on this floor are miniature insets depicting various rooms and their decorations. The three changeable spaces are known as Special Exhibit Galleries and they have short run exhibits that rotate.

Opened in July 2012, "Stories from our Community" is a display that includes artifacts which illustrate stories from community members that are featured in the exhibit space. Visitors can sit at touch-screen displays and choose the stories that they would like to listen to or read. A related website is available that shares the stories on display, in addition to others.

=== Third floor ===
The third level features "The Power of Children: Making a Difference", a permanent exhibit featuring the stories of Anne Frank, Ruby Bridges, Ryan White, and Malala Yousafzai, and the impact these children made on the world. The purpose of the Power of Children is to create a supportive environment where people can examine and discuss issues related to prejudice and discrimination and seek solutions to these problems. Historically accurate, immersive environments are recreated to reflect the place where each of the children spent their lives. First-person interpreters, live theater, and artifacts are designed to facilitate the public understanding of the lives of Frank, Bridges, White, and Yousafzai. The gallery has sounds, dramatic lighting, quotations, interactives, and moving images to draw visitors into the exhibit.

The second exhibit on the third floor is Playscape, a learning and play area designed for children 5 years and younger. Originally opened in 1981, the museum carried out an extensive renovation of Playscape in 2013. The renovated gallery includes and improves upon many of the elements from the previous exhibit, such as a large sandbox area, a water play experience, and an area designated for small children 2 and younger.

=== Fourth floor ===
One of the museum's most popular attractions is the Broad Ripple Park Carousel in the Carousel Wishes and Dreams gallery on the fourth floor. The carousel, whose animal figures were created by Dentzel, was originally installed in the White City Amusement Park in what is now Broad Ripple Park in 1917 and was restored and reinstalled in this museum in 1973. It is the largest of the museum's artifacts. The carousel is a National Historic Landmark. The music is provided by a rare Wurlitzer style #146-B Military Band Organ.

The fourth level houses Science Works (formerly known as Science Spectrum), an exhibit devoted to exploring natural science and physical science through building activities. Children may build toy boats to float along the waterway, play in a construction zone, erect an arch, climb a rock wall, crawl through tunnels, observe a live pond, and participate in other activities. Within Science Works is the Biotech Lab, which hosts daily events focusing on the future of DNA and chemistry and SciencePort which focuses on plant biology.

=== Dinosphere ===
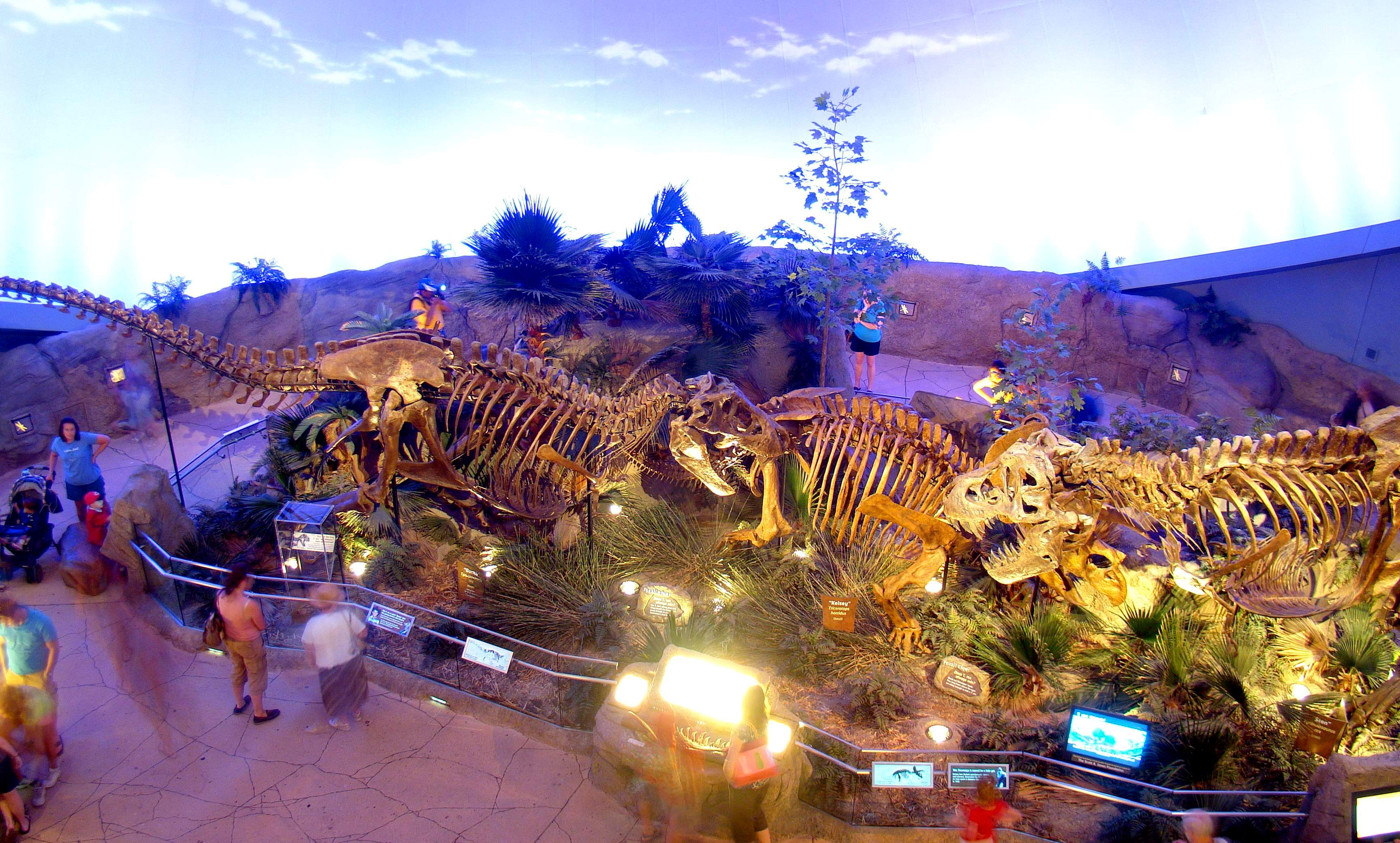
Panoramic view from Dinosphere

Dinosphere is connected to the main museum on the Lower Level (through All Aboard), Level One (near the food court and main entrance gates), and Level Two (through The Mann Properties Gallery of Dinosaur Imagery). Dinosphere was formerly the CineDome Theater. Dinosphere features a sound and light experience that simulates a day in the late Cretaceous period 65 million years ago. The center of the exhibit space includes three themed fossil scenes. Visitors can perform fossil excavations in the Dig Site, touch a real Tyrannosaurus rex femur fossil in the Paleo Prep Lab, talk to real paleontologists, enjoy family-friendly games and touch-screen learning activities, and view numerous real dinosaur fossils from the Cretaceous period on display. Dinosphere is one of the largest displays of juvenile and family dinosaur fossils in the U.S. The exhibit features several species of dinosaurs including Hypacrosaurus, Prenoceratops, Tyrannosaurus rex, Triceratops, Gorgosaurus, Maiasaura, Bambiraptor, Oviraptor, and Dracorex hogwartsia. Several ancient non-dinosaur creatures are also featured, including Didelphodon, Sarcosuchus (super croc), and Pteranodon.

From February 2021 to March 2022, the museum closed the Dinosphere for renovations as part of its Mission Jurassic initiative. The $27.5 million project brought two new exhibits about the Jurassic period to the upper level of the exhibit, one of sauropod dinosaurs and of marine reptiles like Baptanodon and Plioplatecarpus. During the interim period, many of the fossils were on display elsewhere in the museum.

=== Outdoor Sports Experience ===
Opened in 2018, the exhibit offers many different sports activities for visiting families. Indoor areas include a gallery of sports art and an exhibit on the culture of sports. Outdoor areas include basketball, football, tennis, hockey, baseball, soccer, golf, two-pedal race tracks, a tree-house, and a run/walk track that circles the outdoor exhibit.

=== Current Exhibits ===
- American POP
- Power of Children
- Stories from Our Community
- Dinosphere
- Beyond Spaceship Earth
- ScienceWorks
- Fireworks of Glass
- Mini Masterpieces
- National Geographic: Treasures of the Earth
- Playscape
- Carousel Wishes & Dreams
- Lilly Theater
- All Aboard!
- Take Me There: Peru

== See also ==
- Schnull–Rauch House
- List of museums in Indiana
- List of children's museums in the United States
- List of attractions and events in Indianapolis
