= Creative Playthings =

American Toy Company

- Industry: Toys
- Founded: 1945
- Founder: Frank Caplan; Theresa Caplan
- Headquarters: New York City, New York, US
- Products: Toys, furniture, playground equipment

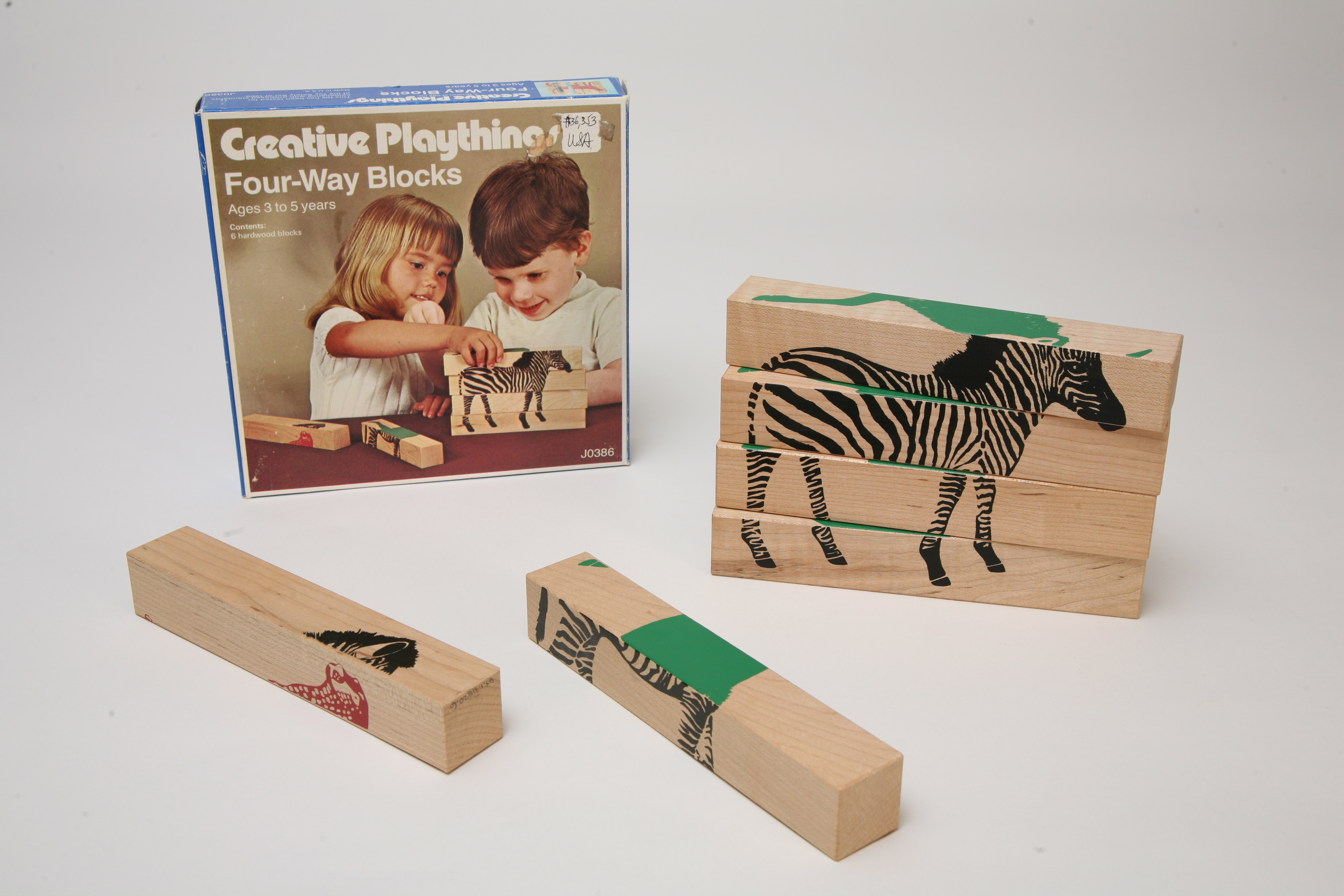
Creative Playthings wooden stacking puzzle

Creative Playthings was an educational toy store and catalogue that was established by Frank and Theresa Caplan in 1945. The goal of Creative Playthings was to provide simple and beautifully designed toys to promote a child’s creativity and imagination.

The original Creative Playthings store was located at 102 West 95th Street in New York City (which they eventually moved to Madison Avenue and 72nd Street). Initially, Frank Caplan made hardwood building blocks himself to sell in their store, often cutting and sanding the sets while parents waited in the shop. He then added animals, people, vehicles and other toys. Caplan believed that providing unpainted abstract forms that emphasized shape, color and texture, as opposed to lifelike details, would stimulate a child’s imagination. In collaboration with Martha New, Caplan also designed sets of large plain maple cubes that young children could rearrange into various forms and furniture. Known as "Hollow Blocks," these and other designs exemplified notions of unstructured play, in which creative usage could be shaped by the individual child instead of determined by the manufacturer.

As Caplan wrote in the first Creative Playthings' catalogue in 1949: "Play has a basic role in the drama of a child's development. It is a serious business for the child, his true means of learning and growing...Every child should have a wide variety of play materials to evoke in him a spirit of inquiry; to develop physical manipulation to the fullest; to stimulate creative expression. He requires not only the miniatures of real objects in the adult world, but also building blocks, clay, finger paints, et cetera, that he can adapt to his particular needs."

== Museum of Modern Art exhibition ==
Beginning in 1949, Creative Playthings embarked on a series of collaborations with the Museum of Modern Art (MoMA) in New York City. In 1949, the children’s room and playroom of Marcel Breuer’s "House in the Museum Garden" (a model one-family home in the east end of the MoMA sculpture garden) was composed almost entirely of Creative Playthings objects and designs, including their "Hollow Blocks." The exhibit was a tremendous success and received considerable publicity, including praise from Eleanor Roosevelt, who commented, "I particularly like the children's playroom with nothing but those hollow blocks which could be made into furniture and still remain toys." An article in The New Yorker also praised Creative Playthings' designs for their innovative and unconventional approach: "If the present kindergarten generation develops, when it has grown up, some rather horrid mass psychosis, I shall certainly be the first to blame it on the general vulgarity of the nursery decoration that our young exposed to. Parents who share my mistrust of cloying pink or blue color schemes, of the ubiquitous Donald Duck motif, and of the sort of furniture that looks like stunted examples of humdrum pieces should by all means investigate the nursery paraphernalia to be found at Creative Playthings."

After the Breuer house, the Museum of Modern Art (MoMA) and Woman's Home Companion cosponsored another model house in the garden featuring Creative Playthings' designs, this time by Los Angeles architect Gregory Ain. The modern "Hollow Blocks" and durable wood toy designs became much sought-after and in 1950 Creative Playthings was incorporated with Frank Caplan as president and Bernard Barenholtz as vice president. Incorporation allowed Caplan and Barenholtz to expand Creative Playthings in order to supply educational toys and equipment to schools.

== Furniture and playground equipment ==
In addition to manufacturing toys for school and home use, Creative Playthings developed children’s furniture and outdoor play environments. Frank Caplan worked with such notable artists, architects, and designers as Isamu Noguchi, Louis Kahn, Henry Moore, and Robert Winston on comprehensive playground designs - although some of these designs were not fully realized. He also collaborated with numerous international artists to design playground equipment, such as the Swedish sculptor, Egon Möller-Nielsen’s fiberglass helical slide.

In 1953, Creative Playthings again joined with the Museum of Modern Art (MoMA) and Parents Magazine to co-sponsor a nationwide contest for imaginative playground design, resulting in a series of award-winning abstract outdoor equipment known as “Play Sculptures” designed by young artists. Stemming from Frank Caplan’s commitment to children in urban contexts, Creative Playthings sought to rethink urban play space and redefine the traditional jungle gym through modern art, encouraging children to explore different shapes, textures and spaces and use their imagination in active play.

== Later partnerships ==
In 1954, Frank Caplan began a close collaboration with Swiss toymaker Antonio Vitali to design a series of "Playforms" - smooth sculpted animals, vehicles, and figures in wood that fit neatly into a child's hands. The abstract "Playforms" became signature pieces of Creative Playthings and were highly praised by numerous design magazines and organizations, such as Interiors and Arts and Architecture.

In the early 1960s, Creative Playthings was the first company to manufacture and sell kalimbas designed by ethnomusicologist Hugh Tracey. They commissioned other musical instruments, including Xylopipes, a xylophone using hollow metal tubes, designed by John Rosenbaum.

In 1967, Caplan introduced the first anatomically correct dolls to the U.S., which was met with some controversy.

In 1968, Creative Playthings sold a repackaged Raytheon Lectron Series 3 model as their S822 Lectron LCIII.

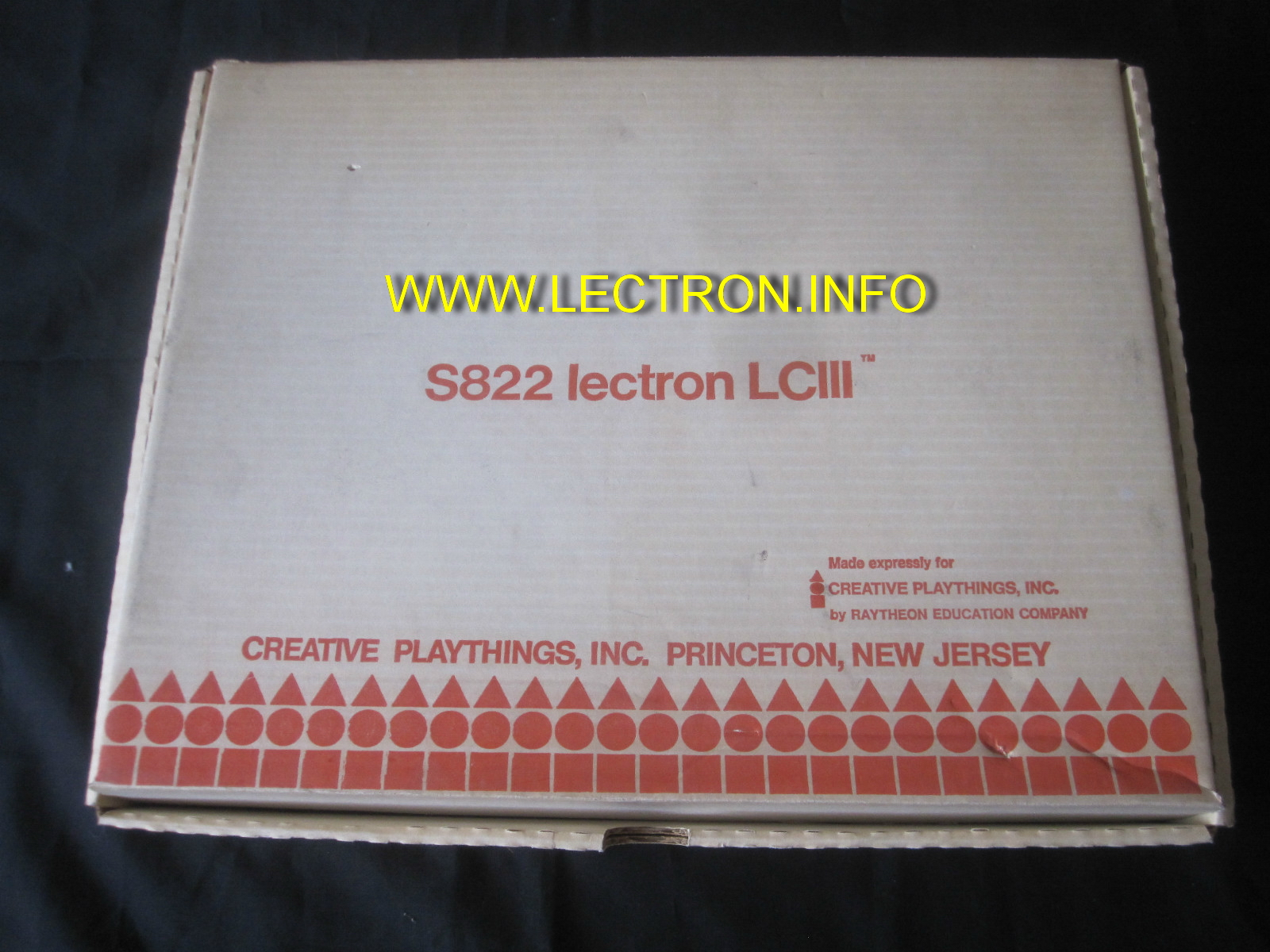
Creative Playthings - Lectron S822 Model

== Acquisition ==
In 1966, CBS purchased Creative Playthings as part of its move to corner the educational material and media market. Frank Caplan stayed on for two years as a consulting director and in 1968 became president of the CBS Learning Center. He eventually resigned in 1969. In the mid-1980s, CBS revived the Creative Playthings name to use on a line of wooden playground equipment. These were produced in Herndon, PA, and a CBS-owned plant, which had also made Tinkertoys. After CBS divested itself of its toy lines beginning in 1985, the name was sold to a playground equipment manufacturer in Framingham, MA.
