= Theresa Caplan =

American scholar of early childhood development and collector of worldwide toys

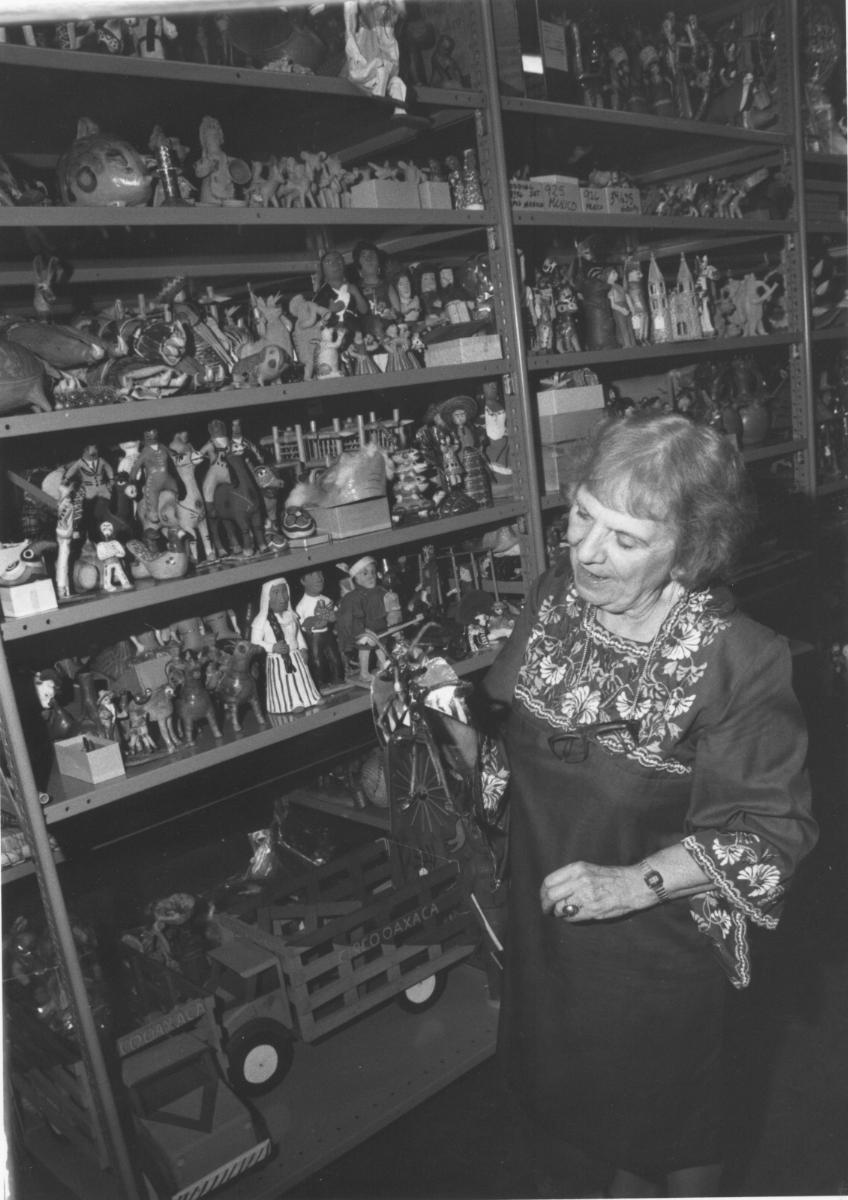
- Caplan with some of her collection
- Born: 6 June 1913
- Died: 10 April 2010 (aged 96); Princeton, New Jersey, United States
- Occupations: Founder of Creative Playthings, Toy Developer, Educator, Author, Youth Worker
- Spouse: Frank Caplan

Theresa Caplan (1913–2010) was an American twentieth-century scholar of early childhood development and a collector of worldwide toys. Working with her husband Frank, she wrote multiple acclaimed books and built a massive collection of toys that is now part of a significant museum.

Born on 6 June 1913, Caplan collaborated with her husband in authoring multiple books that studied the ways in which children played, whether alone or individually, and at different ages; for example, one of their books, The First Twelve Months of Life, concentrated on infants but included observations of children two years old and comparisons with adult trade unions.

During World War II, while living in northern Manhattan, New York City, the Caplans founded a workshop on 95th Street to manufacture and sell wooden toys for children. From its earliest years, Theresa was involved with her husband's company: when it was a single small store, she worked with customers while Frank completed their orders. War shortages increased their profits: wooden toys were rare during the war, so the high quality of toys that the couple manufactured was popularized by word of mouth, and their business grew significantly. In 1949, they named the business "Creative Playthings", which operated until its sale in 1966. As it expanded, the couple travelled around the world to find models for their crafts; by the 1980s, they had accumulated more than fifty thousand individual toys as models, and they gradually began to see themselves as collectors. Because their work and their collection were both international, they were able by themselves to produce a display that was featured at the United Nations Headquarters as part of the International Year of the Child in 1979.

In 1984, while living in Princeton, New Jersey, the Caplans chose to donate their collection to The Children's Museum of Indianapolis; the collection was so massive that the museum needed nine months to unpack the thirty-two crates used to transport it. After the donation was complete, Frank died in 1988 at the age of seventy-seven. After Frank's death, Theresa remembered herself as having been more active in collecting than her husband for a time, but noted that their collection truly began to grow in 1966, as the sale of the business permitted Frank to pay less attention to financial matters. Described as enthusiastic and extroverted, Caplan was a detailed record-keeper. She was careful to assign every object in the collection a unique identifier as well as recording the country of origin for every object, and she ensured that all boxes were separately identified. Written on twenty thousand index cards, her records filled twenty-eight shoe boxes by the time that the collection was donated to Indianapolis.

Theresa died in Princeton on 13 April 2010 aged 96.
