= Tom Thurman =

American filmmaker (born 1962)

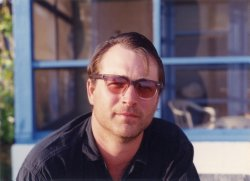
- Tom Thurman (2012)
- Born: Thomas Lee Thurman; March 26, 1962 (age 64); United States
- Occupation: Filmmaker

Tom Thurman (born March 26, 1962) is an American filmmaker.

Since 1992, he has produced and directed 40 documentaries on art, film, music, sports and literary figures, including Nick Nolte, Warren Oates, Ben Johnson, Harry Crews, Jerry Wexler, Tod Browning, John Ford, Hunter S. Thompson and Sam Peckinpah. As a producer/writer for Kentucky Educational Television in Lexington, Thurman directed documentaries for the series Kentucky Muse, a showcase for artists with Kentucky roots. Programs in this series created by Thurman include In the Garden of Music (about musician Harry Pickens), Picture This (about photographer Julius Friedman) and Crossing Mulholland (about actor Harry Dean Stanton).

He lives in Lexington, Kentucky, with his wife Lynn Motley. They have two children.

== Early career ==
Thurman was born in Christianburg, Kentucky, a small farming community in Shelby County. He received a bachelor's degree in 1984 from Centre College and a master's degree in English/Film Studies from the University of Kentucky in 1988. Thurman subsequently taught in the English departments at Tulane University and Berea College, and in 2012, 2017 and 2018 was a visiting lecturer in film studies at Centre College.

== Film career ==
Thurman began his role as director with a documentary on the late Kentucky character actor Warren Oates in 1992. He has since produced and directed a string of feature-length independent documentaries that have aired on PBS and cable networks such as Starz, Encore and The Sundance Channel.

Those featured in Thurman's documentaries included Charlton Heston, James Coburn, Peter Fonda, Andrew Sarris, Peter Bogdanovich, Ned Beatty, Monte Hellman, Millie Perkins, Thomas McGuane, Russell Chatham, James Dickey, Lawrence Tierney, L.Q. Jones, R.G. Armstrong, Ray Charles, Wilson Pickett, Etta James, Solomon Burke, John Prine, Doug Sahm, Aretha Franklin, Oliver Stone, Stella Stevens, Benicio Del Toro, Billy Bob Thornton, Sean Penn, George McGovern, John Cusack, Jacqueline Bisset, and Johnny Depp. Frequent collaborators included songwriters Donnie Fritts and Kris Kristofferson, actor Harry Dean Stanton, writer Stanley Booth, and critics FX Feeney, David Thomson, Leonard Maltin and Elvis Mitchell. Thurman often works with writer Tom Marksbury, who teaches in the English department at the University of Kentucky.

After the Oates project, he worked on two documentaries that received limited distribution: Guilty as Charged (completed 1993, about writer Harry Crews), and Third Cowboy on the Right (completed 1996, about actor Ben Johnson). A work-in-progress print of Third Cowboy was screened at the 1996 Bergamo Film Meeting in Italy, which was attended by Thurman, Harry Carey Jr. and Ben Johnson. After the screening, Johnson was overheard telling the director "It's a lot better than I thought it would be." Johnson died of a heart attack in Arizona before seeing the completed version of the film, which received its European premiere at the Munich Film Festival and domestic premiere at the Telluride Film Festival.

Thurman then shifted from film history to music as he embarked upon a project documenting the life and career of Atlantic Records producer Jerry Wexler. From New York City to New Orleans to Memphis and onto Muscle Shoals, he traced Wexler's work as one of the most influential, beloved and also feared figures in all of contemporary American music. In 1998, when Wexler was in Memphis receiving an award for his contributions to that city's musical heritage, Thurman asked Wexler what he wanted written on his tombstone. Wexler told the filmmaker, "Two words: More bass." This exchange was later printed in the August 15, 2008 New York Times obituary for Wexler, who died in Sarasota at age 91.

Movies of Color: Black Southern Cinema is Thurman's homage to independent African-American films made between World War I and World War II. It has screened on numerous public television stations throughout the country since 2001. In the February 13 edition of Africana.com, critic Armand White wrote that Movies of Color documented "historical examples of regional filmmaking (and regional scholarship) that are models for an original, valuable cinema culture…Movies of Color is a road map. It is essential." The documentary was awarded a regional Emmy award in 2001 from The National Association of Television Arts and Sciences in the Arts and Culture category.

2002 marked the beginning of a relationship between Thurman and Starz Entertainment. John Ford Goes to War, which documents the propaganda films made by the director for the Office of Strategic Services during World War II, features Peter Bogdanovich, Oliver Stone, F.X Feeney, Richard Schickel, Leonard Maltin, Dan Ford (the director's grandson) and a rare on-camera appearance by influential film critic and scholar Andrew Sarris. When released on DVD in 2006, critic Mike Clark listed the documentary as his highest-ranked release for the country in the January 5 edition of USA Today.

Sam Peckinpah's West: Legacy of a Hollywood Renegade (2003) was produced for Starz/Encore's The Westerns Channel and premiered at the Egyptian Theatre in Hollywood. It later was included on the Warner Bros. release of the Sam Peckinpah boxed set collection (the documentary is included on the DVD alongside The Wild Bunch). The National Heritage Museum awarded Thurman its award for Outstanding Documentary for the Peckinpah project, and in October 2003 Centre College conferred upon him its Distinguished Alumni Award. In the November 6, 2005 edition of The Sunday Times of London, critic Bryan Appleyard wrote: "The second-best documentary I have seen recently was Sam Peckinpah's West: Legacy of a Hollywood Renegade. I could have watched it all day, for the simple reason that it told me what I wanted to know about a great but flawed cinema artist. The best documentary was Martin Scorsese's two-parter about Bob Dylan – in that archival material was sculpted by another great cinema artist into a superbly coherent and resonant story."

In a 2006 production for Starz, Thurman directed Buy the Ticket, Take the Ride: Hunter S. Thompson on Film. Premiering at the 2006 Hollywood Film Festival, the documentary contained a who's who of Thompson family members, colleagues, friends, admirers and detractors, including Johnny Depp, Sean Penn, George McGovern, Tom Wolfe, William F. Buckley Jr., Gary Hart, and Nick Tosches. The reviews were mixed, however, with the harshest opinion appearing in the December 12, 2006 edition of The New York Times. Reviewer Anita Gates attacks the documentary's narrator (Nick Nolte), writer (Tom Marksbury) and director. She describes Nolte as sounding like "less like an outlaw than a slightly slow student who doesn't understand the words he is reading." She adds that "Marksbury's sometimes-pedestrian script doesn't help." Finally, Gates remarks that "the talking heads rattle on, and even interviews with Mr. Thompson are relatively uninformative. It seems that the director, Tom Thurman, couldn't bring himself to edit out any celebrity comment, even if that person's point had been made several times before." The Boston Globe, in a December 12, 2006 review, was more kind, saying that Buy the Ticket "impressively delivers a strong sense of Thompson the man…"

2008 marked the release of Thurman's documentary Nick Nolte: No Exit, which premiered at the Karlovy Vary Film Festival. The documentary was acquired by IFC Films and currently airs on The Sundance Channel. In her January 6, 2010 column for USA Today, Whitney Matheson wrote that "Nick Nolte: No Exit is one of those movies that's destined to become a cult classic…" Other reviews were harsh, however. In the March 17, 2010 edition of the Chicago Sun-Times, Roger Ebert wrote: "Nick Nolte is an interesting actor. Perhaps too interesting to appear in an independent documentary about himself. Perhaps too interesting to be interviewed by someone else. In 'Nick Nolte: No Exit,' he interviews himself. The way he does this does what it can to assist a fairly pointless documentary."

In 2013, Thurman directed a documentary for Kentucky Television about Louisville native Wendy Whelan, a principal dancer with the New York City Ballet. Seven more documentaries followed over the next four years, on topics including Actors Theatre of Louisville, glassblower Lino Tagliapetra and musician Merle Travis.

In 2018, Thurman completed his documentary on acclaimed author Robert Penn Warren. In the subsequent years, he directed five more films on a far-ranging variety of topics: writer Walter Tevis, best known for his novels The Hustler and The Queen’s Gambit; low-budget film noirs; the Louisville couple Alice and Wade Houston; painter Henry Lawrence Faulkner; and the Kentucky rock/country band Exile, best known for its 1978 chart-topping hit "Kiss You All Over". Thurman's documentary on film noir (Dark Frames), with narration by British author/film historian David Thomson and soundtrack by Chuck Prophet, received its premiere at the 2021 Telluride Film Festival. On March 22, 2025, the film screened at the Alibi Festival in Perugia, Italy.

In April 2025, Barnes and Noble published Thurman's first book of poetry: Mayberry Haiku, a book composed entirely of haiku poems about The Andy Griffith Show.

Thurman is a Filmmaker-in-Residence at Florida State University’s College of Motion Picture Arts.

== Filmography ==
- Across the Border (1992) – about actor Warren Oates
- Guilty as Charged (1993) – about writer Harry Crews
- Third Cowboy on the Right (1996) – about actor Ben Johnson
- Lee Smith: Signature (1996) – about author Lee Smith
- Immaculate Funk (2000) – about music producer Jerry Wexler
- Movies of Color (2001) – about independent African-American cinema
- Great Balls of Fire (2002) – about basketball in Kentucky
- John Ford Goes to War (2002) – about film director John Ford
- Master of the Macabre (2004) – about director Tod Browning
- Legacy of a Hollywood Renegade (2003) – about film director Sam Peckinpah
- Buy the Ticket, Take the Ride (2006) – about writer Hunter S. Thompson
- No Exit (2008) – about actor Nick Nolte
- Fire (2008) – about glass artist Stephen Powell
- Mountain Music Gathering (2008) – about traditional mountain music
- The Wonder Team (2010) – about Centre College's 1921 football team
- Hands of Clay (2010) – about sculptor Joe Molinaro
- In the Garden of Music (2010) – about pianist Harry Pickins
- Shades of Blue (2011) – about musical group Tin Can Buddha
- Picture This (2011) – about photographer Julius Friedman
- Crossing Mulholland (2011) – about actor Harry Dean Stanton
- Guns and Guitars (2012) – about actor Roy Rogers
- Exile on Gower Street (2012) – about actor Harry Carey Sr.
- The Boys from Republic (2012) – about The Three Mesquiteers
- New Deal Troubadour (2012) – about actor Gene Autry
- B-Movie Aristocrat (2012) – about actor Randolph Scott
- The Lone Star Cowboy (2012) – about actor John Wayne
- Moments of Grace (2013) – about ballet dancer Wendy Whelan
- Actors Theatre of Louisville (2014) – about the regional theater company
- Appalatin (2014) – about the Louisville-based music group Appalatin
- Gatewood (2014) – about Kentucky politician Gatewood Galbraith (producer only)
- Lino (2015) – about glassblower Lino Tagliapietra
- Guitar Man (2015) – about musician Merle Travis
- The Hilltoppers (2016) – about the 1950s musical group
- Kentucky By Design (2017) – about 19th century utilitarian art
- Robert Penn Warren: A Vision (2018) – about the Pulitzer Prize-winning writer, a Kentucky native
- A Writer’s Gambit (2021) – about writer Walter Tevis
- Dark Frames (2021) – about low-budget film noirs from the 1940s and 1950s
- The Alice and Wade Houston Story (2023) – about Louisville business owners/philanthropists
- Poetry in Paint (2023) – about painter Henry Lawrence Faulkner
- Exile: 60 Years of Music (2024) – about the Kentucky-based rock/country band
