= Moretti (surname) =

Moretti is an Italian surname. Notable people with the surname include:

- Alessandra Moretti (born 1973), Italian politician
- Alice Moretti (1921–2022), Swiss politician
- Amalia Moretti (1872–1947), Italian physician and journalist
- Amy Schwartz Moretti, American violinist
- Andrea Moretti (born 1972), former Italian rugby union player
- Bob Moretti (1936–1984), Californian politician
- Bruno Moretti (born 1957), Italian composer and frequent collaborator with choreographer Mauro Bigonzetti
- Bruno Moretti (Paralympian) (1941–2021), Australian Paralympian
- Chiara Moretti (1955–2023), Italian actress
- Cristina Favre-Moretti (born 1963), Swiss ski mountaineer, long-distance runner and mountain biker
- Christopher Moretti (born 1986), Italian Grand Prix motorcycle racer
- Cristoforo Moretti, Lombard painter of the quattrocento
- David Moretti (born 1981), American actor
- Davide Moretti (born 1998), Italian basketball player; son of Paolo Moretti
- Elena Moretti (born 1987), Italian judoka
- Emiliano Moretti (born 1981), Italian footballer
- Enrico Moretti, Italian-born American economist
- Éric Dupond-Moretti (born 1961), French criminal defence lawyer
- Fabrizio Moretti (art dealer) (born 1976), Italian art dealer
- Fabrizio Moretti (born 1980), Brazilian-born drummer in American band The Strokes
- Fedorico Moretti (1769-1839), Italian composer, musical theorist and guitarist
- Filomena Moretti (born 1973), Italian classical guitarist
- Francesco Saverio Moretti (1800–1866), Italian painter active in the Marche region
- Franco Moretti (born 1950), Italian literary scholar
- Frank Moretti (1943–2013), professor at Columbia University
- Giampiero Moretti (1940–2012), Italian racing driver
- Giangiacomo Moretti (1843–?), Croatian-born Italian painter, mainly of genre subjects
- Giovanni Moretti (footballer) (1909–1971), Italian professional forward football player
- Giuseppe Moretti (botanist) (1782–1853), Italian botanist
- Giovanni Moretti (bishop) (1923–2018), Apostolic Pro-Nuncio of Thailand; Apostolic Delegate to Malaysia, Singapore, Laos
- Giovanni Moretti (composer) (1807–1884), Italian composer and conductor active in Naples
- Giuseppe Moretti (1857–1935), Italian sculptor
- Hector Moretti (born 1973), former professional tennis player from Argentina
- Hans Moretti (1928–2013), Ukrainian illusionist and escapologist
- Isabelle Moretti (born 1964), French harpist
- Isabella Crettenand-Moretti, née Moretti (born 1963), Swiss ski mountaineer, long-distance and mountain runner
- Joe Moretti (1938–2012), Scottish guitarist
- Joseph Moretti (died 1793), Italianòborn-German architect
- Isabella Crettenand-Moretti (born 1963), Swiss ski mountaineer, marathon mountain biker, long-distance and mountain runner
- Kennedy Moretti (born 1966), Brazilian pianist and music professor
- Lisa Mary Moretti, (born 1961), American wrestler, known as "Ivory"
- Lorenzo Moretti (born 2002), Italian professional footballer
- Luca Moretti (born 2000), Italy international rugby league footballer
- Luigi Moretti (politician) (1944), Italian politician
- Luigi Moretti (archbishop) (born 1949), Italian Roman Catholic Archbishop of Salerno-Campagna-Acerno from 2010 to 2019
- Luigi Moretti (1907–1973), Italian architect
- Marino Moretti (1885–1979), Italian poet and author
- Mario Moretti (born 1946), Italian terrorist
- Mario Moretti (rower) (1906–1977), Italian rower
- Mario Moretti Polegato (born 1952), Italian entrepreneur, founder of Geox company
- Marzio Moretti (born 2002), Italian racing driver
- Maurizio Moretti (1945–2021), Italian professional footballer
- Mauro Moretti (born 1953), Italian executive and former CEO and General Manager of Leonardo S.p.A.
- Michel Moretti (born 1989), French footballer
- Michele Moretti (1908–1995), Italian partisan, trade unionist and footballer
- Michèle Moretti (born 1940), French actress
- Nanni Moretti (born 1953), Italian film director, producer and actor
- Paolo Moretti (born 1970), Italian basketball player and coach; father of Davide Moretti
- Pasqualino Moretti (born 1947), former Italian cyclist
- Raoul Moretti (1893–1954), a French composer of film scores
- Riccardo Moretti (born 1985), Italian motorcycle racer
- Riccardo Moretti (rower) (born 1967), Italian rower
- Stefano Moretti, Italian musician, singer and teacher of music
- Tito Moretti (1840–1913), Italian painter and manuscript illuminator
- Tobias Moretti (born 1959), Austrian actor
- Willie Moretti (1894–1951), Italian-American mafia underboss

== See also ==
- Moretti (disambiguation)
