= University of Washington Tacoma =

Public university in Tacoma, Washington, US

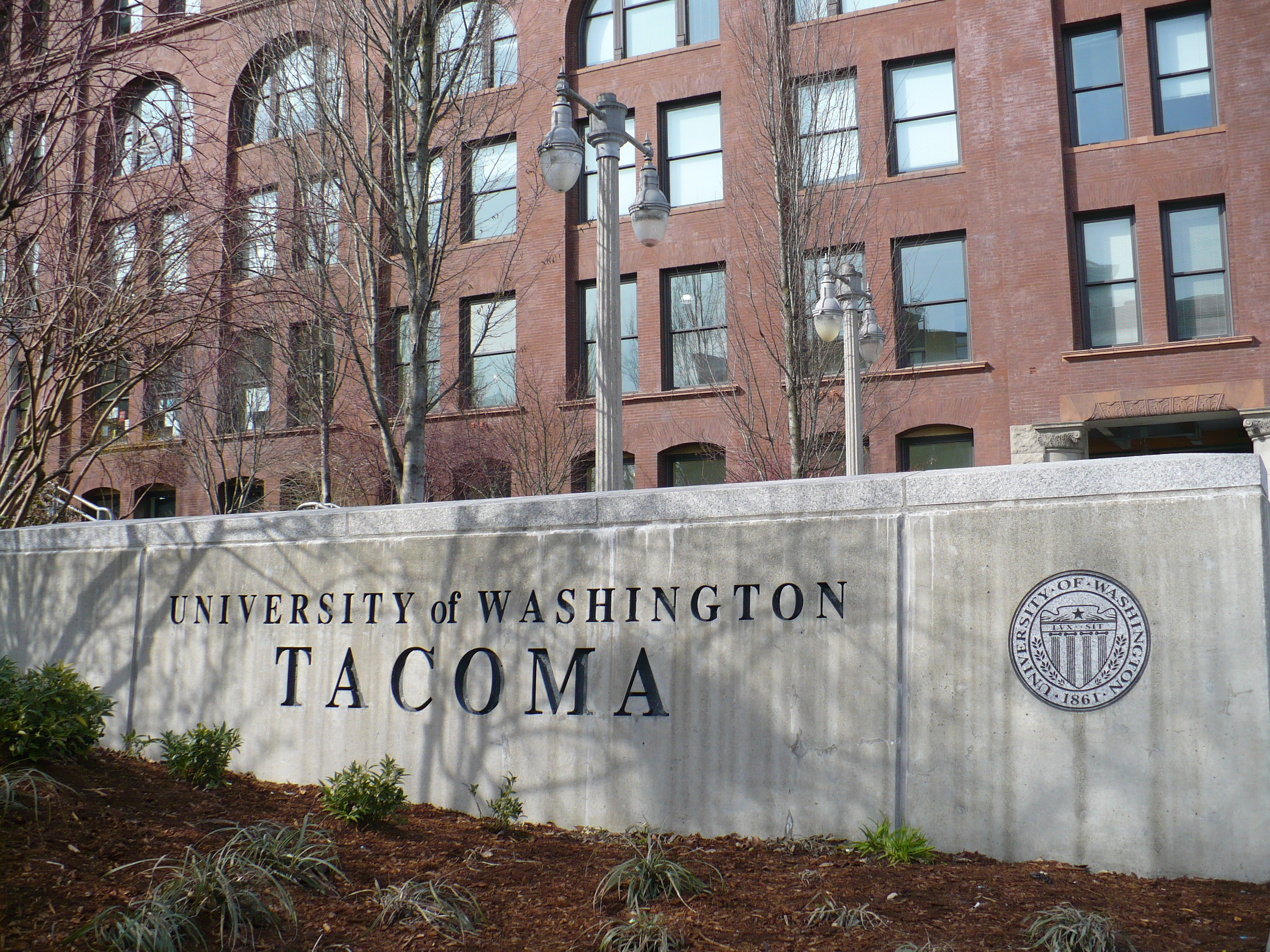
- Motto: Lux sit
- Motto in English: Let there be light
- Type: Public university
- Established: 1990; 36 years ago
- Parent institution: University of Washington
- Chancellor: Sheila Edwards Lange
- Faculty: 347
- Administrative staff: 340
- Students: 5,135
- Undergraduates: 4,291
- Postgraduates: 696
- Location: Tacoma, Washington, United States; 47.2448°N 122.4378°W
- Campus: Urban
- Mascot: Hendrix the Husky
- Website: tacoma.uw.edu

The University of Washington Tacoma (UW Tacoma or UWT) is a university located in Tacoma, Washington, United States. It is one of three campuses of the University of Washington, alongside the main campus in Seattle and UW Bothell in Bothell. UW Tacoma opened its first classrooms in repurposed warehouses in downtown Tacoma in 1990 and opened its permanent campus in 1997. The president and board of regents of the University of Washington oversee the Tacoma campus, which falls under the university's three-campus accreditation. UW Tacoma is led by a chancellor. Sheila Edwards Lange holds the post as of 2026.

== History ==
Following the establishment of The Evergreen State College in Olympia in 1967, interest in additional higher education opportunities in the South Sound continued to grow. In 1986, the Higher Education Coordination Board suggested branch campuses for both the University of Washington and Washington State University. Tacoma and Bothell were chosen as new UW campus sites, and three locations were selected for new WSU campuses: Vancouver, the Tri-Cities and Spokane. The initial goal of the new campuses was to provide further education for the growing numbers of community college transfer students, as well as "time bound, place bound" students with limited access to educational opportunities in programs with "demonstrated regional needs."

The University of Washington Board of Regents selected four finalist sites for the Tacoma-area campus in September 1989 out of a pool of 20 reviewed sites: a 79-acre (32 ha) downtown site, a Hilltop site, an area adjacent to the Tacoma Community College campus, and a rural site near Interstate 5 in Fife. The Hilltop and Fife sites were eliminated by the Board of Regents in March 1990, while a smaller downtown site near Union Station was added to the list of finalists. The Union Station site was ultimately chosen for the permanent branch campus in November 1990.

The University of Washington Tacoma campus began classes on October 1, 1990 in downtown Tacoma's historic Perkins Building. The 8 story structure was chosen in part for its capacity; during UW Tacoma's early years and construction of the permanent campus further south, enrollments comprised a maximum of approximately 401 juniors and seniors. During this time, downtown Tacoma's appearance and local reputation began to change.

The current campus celebrated its long-awaited opening on May 29, 1997. Since the opening of the first building, several others have been renovated. Part of the campus library formerly served as the Snoqualmie Falls Power Company's transformer house. Building names such as Mattress Factory and West Coast Grocery recall the structures' earlier uses. Transportation within the downtown area was improved with the addition of Sound Transit's 1.6-mile Tacoma Link light rail line in 2003.

Following several years of transfer-only undergraduate admissions, UW Tacoma admitted its first freshman class of just under 200 students in Autumn of 2006. UW Tacoma expects to continue to increase enrollment and add additional buildings. In March 2011, the campus opened the renovated Russell T. Joy Building, the last of the formerly blighted warehouse buildings along the campus' Pacific Avenue boundary. The campus purchased Court 17 Apartments in 2016 as a dorm that now houses 290 students. As of September 2016 the campus had 5000 students.

Tacoma School of the Arts (SOTA) students use UWT classroom space for their humanities classes. In return, the university uses SOTA's artistic resources for evening classes.

== Campus ==
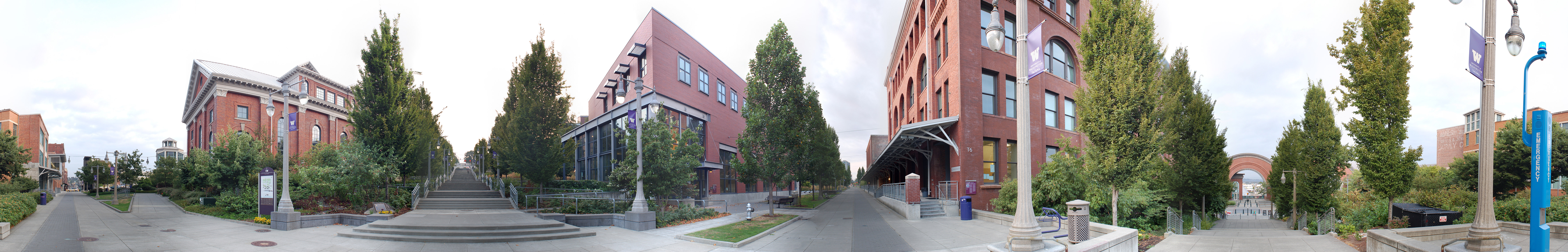
180° panorama on the University of Washington Tacoma campus.

The 46-acre campus is located on a hillside at the southern edge of downtown Tacoma, overlooking the Port of Tacoma and Mount Rainier. Set in the historic Union Station District, UW Tacoma renovated century-old, brick buildings that were built by businesses that depended on the railroad in the late 1880s and early 1900s. The university has earned architectural awards for transforming these buildings into modern classrooms. In the design of the campus, UW Tacoma honored the traditions of the Northern Pacific Railway and its part in establishing the city of Tacoma.

Located on the east side of the campus across Pacific Ave are the Washington State History Museum, the Tacoma Art Museum, the beautifully reconstructed Union Station, and the Children's Museum of Tacoma. On the north side of the Washington State History Museum is the Chihuly Bridge of Glass. The Chihuly Bridge of Glass is a pedestrian walkway that crosses over Interstate 705 and leads to the Museum of Glass.

== Academics ==
UW Tacoma offers 60 undergraduate majors and 15 graduate programs. Degrees are offered through the university's seven schools and one institute:

- School of Education
- School of Engineering & Technology
- Institute of Innovation & Global Engagement
- School of Interdisciplinary Arts & Sciences
- Milgard School of Business
- School of Nursing & Healthcare Leadership
- School of Social Work & Criminal Justice
- School of Urban Studies

== Public transportation ==
UW Tacoma is served by Union station on Sound Transit's T line. Passengers can travel northwest into Downtown Tacoma all the way until Hilltop, or southeast to Tacoma Dome Station, where transfers to Sounder Commuter Rail to Lakewood and Seattle are possible, Amtrak Cascades to Vancouver or Eugene and the Coast Starlight to either Seattle or Los Angeles.

== Student life ==
=== Residence hall ===
Student on-campus housing is offered at UW Tacoma's Court 17 Residence Hall. The residence hall provides housing for 290 students.

=== Fitness and student center ===
The University Y Student Center is a collaboration between the UW Tacoma and the YMCA of Pierce and Kitsap Counties. The Y is a 73,000 square foot facility that includes recreational and fitness spaces, an NCAA regulation gymnasium, cardio and weight training equipment, indoor track, and locker rooms. The facility is also a student center which houses student organization space, programming, and event spaces, as well as a student lounge and social spaces.

=== Publication ===
The Ledger is the independent student-run newspaper of UW Tacoma. It publishes an eight-page edition every Monday during fall, winter, and spring academic quarters and posts content online.

== Notable alumni ==
- Eric Barone, video game designer known professionally as ConcernedApe
- Pat McCarthy, Washington State Auditor
- Dawn Morrell, nurse and former member of the Washington House of Representatives
