= Laura de Santillana =

Italian contemporary glass artist (1955–2019)

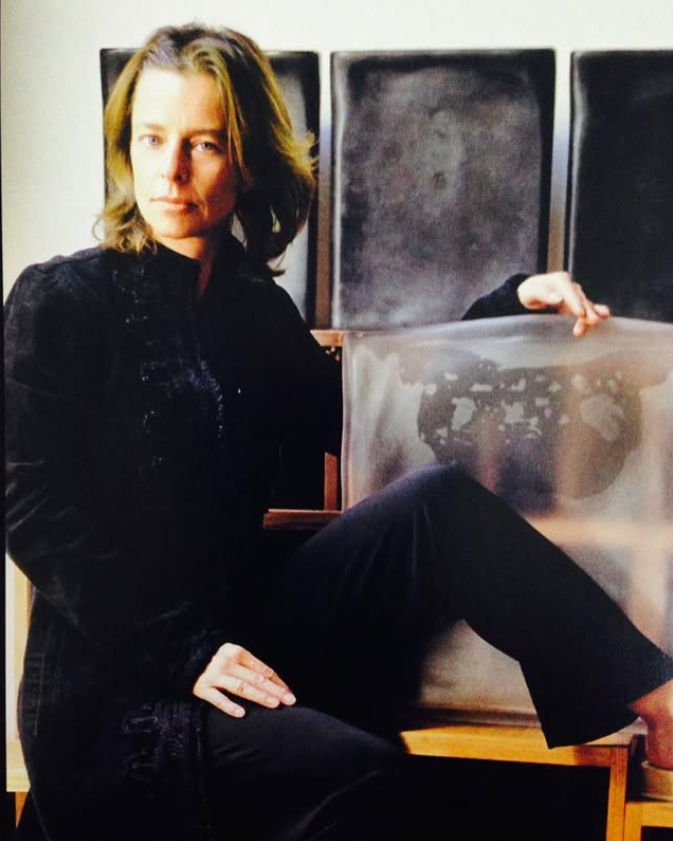
- Laura de Santillana
- Born: 1955; Venice, Italy
- Died: 2019 (aged 63–64)
- Known for: Glass art
- Movement: Contemporary art
- Relatives: Giorgio de Santillana (grandfather) Paolo Venini (grandfather)

Laura de Santillana (1955–2019) was an Italian artist and designer known primarily for her glass sculptures and design objects. Though she predominantly produced her works in Murano, Italy, she regularly collaborated with American glass masters and, during the final six years of her career, also worked with glass studios in Nový Bor, Czech Republic. De Santillana's artwork explores the materiality of glass sculpture as a medium for aesthetic contemplation and spiritual reflection. Her artistic inquiry consistently revolved around variations of a central theme, examining form, color combinations, and the expressive potential of glass in both handcrafted and industrial contexts. Following her death, the De Santillana Foundation Stichting was established in 2021, dedicated to preserving, promoting, and researching the artistic heritage of the Venini-De Santillana family.

== Early life and education ==
De Santillana was the granddaughter of Paolo Venini, founder of the Venini glassworks, and daughter of Anna Venini and architect Ludovico Diaz de Santillana. Her family's artistic legacy significantly influenced her intellectual and creative development and she often acknowledged the pivotal roles played by her grandfather Giorgio de Santillana and her father Ludovico.

In 1975, she moved to New York, attending evening classes at the School of Visual Arts under Milton Glaser and working as a graphic designer at Massimo Vignelli’s studio, Vignelli Associates. There, she developed her meticulous approach, handling photography publications and co-creating Venini’s visual identity with Massimo Vignelli (1982-1983).

== Artistic career ==
=== Design experience ===
From 1975 to 1985, de Santillana collaborated closely with Venini, designing vases, glassware, and lighting while mastering traditional Murano glass techniques, teamwork, and production processes. Early on, she adopted traditional glassmaking techniques with unconventional colors, notably producing murrine glass plates such as "Piatto Numeri" and "Le Quattro Stagioni." These early works were featured in the Corning Museum of Glass exhibition "New Glass: A Worldwide Survey" (1979). Her talent received international recognition with awards such as the Zweiter Coburger Glaspreis from the Coburg Museum.

During her tenure at Venini, she served as Ludovico’s right-hand collaborator, managing commercial projects and private commissions, reorganizing the company archives alongside her brother, and exploring new techniques and expressions in glass. In 1985, after the Venini family’s departure from the company, she co-founded EOS – Design nel Vetro (1986-1992) with her family, serving first as designer, then as artistic director (1989-1993). At EOS, she introduced designs distinct from Venini’s style and collaborated with international brands like Rosenthal, Steuben Glass Works, and Arcade.

=== Artistic exploration ===
Following the closure of EOS, de Santillana fully dedicated herself to artistic creation, producing autonomous glass sculptures initially crafted by masters Pino Signoretto and Lino Tagliapietra, and from 1995 onwards with Simone Cenedese. Her sculptures were exhibited internationally beginning in 1993, particularly through Barry Friedman Ltd. in New York, who showcased various phases of her artistic exploration until 2011.

A significant turning point occurred in 1998 during a session with Cenedese, when an overly compressed blown-glass bubble created an unusable rectangular form. This accidental discovery led to her renowned "flat shape" sculptures, first exhibited in 1999 at Galerie l’Arc en Seine in Paris and the Museo Correr in Venice in 2002, becoming a hallmark of her oeuvre for over two decades. Between 2009 and 2019, her works were prominently shown internationally, including at the Venice Biennale, Yorkshire Sculpture Park, and MAK Vienna.

=== International collaborations ===
Travel profoundly influenced de Santillana's work, notably the architectural and philosophical traditions of Japan and the rich cultural heritage of India and Sri Lanka. Notable references in her artistic development included Indian Ragas, Jaipur’s archaeological gardens, the Jantar Mantar, the Calico Museum of Textiles, and the ruins of Polonnaruwa in Sri Lanka.

From 2009, de Santillana undertook artist residencies at Tacoma Museum of Glass and worked closely with master glassblower James Mongrain, producing larger and heavier pieces distinguished by fluid forms influenced by American Studio Glass. From 2013 until her death in 2019, she focused on industrial techniques such as slumping in Nový Bor, Czech Republic, employing unique uranium-based pigments only available there, and producing large-scale, uniquely stable sculptures with the collaboration of engineers rather than glassblowers.

== Exhibitions ==
De Santillana's solo and group exhibitions spanned globally renowned venues, including the Gallerie dell’Accademia (Venice), Museum of Arts and Design (New York), MAK Vienna, and Venice Biennale, reflecting her international stature and innovative contributions to contemporary glass art.

== Public collections ==
Her works are held by prestigious institutions worldwide, including the Corning Museum of Glass, Victoria and Albert Museum, Seattle Art Museum, Los Angeles County Museum of Art, MUDAC (Lausanne), and Museu de Arte de São Paulo among others.
