= Moratti =

Moratti is an Italian surname. Notable people with the surname include:

- Angelo Moratti (1909–1981), Italian petroleum businessman
- Letizia Moratti (born 1949), Italian businesswoman and politician
- Massimo Moratti (born 1945), Italian petroleum businessman

== See also ==
- Moretti (disambiguation)
