= James Mongrain =

James Mongrain (b. 1968 or 1969 (age 56–57)) is a Seattle-area glass artist. He was educated at Moorhead State University in Minnesota, then studied glassblowing at Massachusetts College of Art and Design and the Appalachian Center for Crafts. Mongrain lives in Everett, Washington and operates a studio in Mukilteo at a former salmon smokehouse. He is considered one of the leading artists of the studio glass movement in the Pacific Northwest, and has unique mastery of Venetian goblets, combining the techniques of using a mold and blown glass on the same piece.

Mongrain has worked as a gaffer at Dale Chihuly's shop since 1996, including contributing to the Chihuly Over Venice show and the Bridge of Glass. He has been an artist in residence at Museum of Glass in Tacoma, Corning Museum of Glass's studio, and at Pittsburgh Glass Center.

His glass was part of a Paula Hayes exhibit at Museum of Modern Art in the winter of 2010–2011.

== Television ==
Mongrain designed and built a chandelier for the Extreme Home Makeover television show c. 2005.
