= Nick Nolte: No Exit =

- Directed by: Tom Thurman
- Produced by: Tom Thurman
- Starring: Nick Nolte
- Cinematography: James Ochsenbein
- Edited by: James Piston; Darren Platt
- Music by: Otto Helmuth; Frank Schaap
- Distributed by: Sundance Selects
- Release date: July 6, 2008 (Karlovy Vary)
- Running time: 74 minutes
- Country: United States
- Language: English

Nick Nolte: No Exit is a 2008 documentary about actor Nick Nolte. The documentary was directed by Tom Thurman.

== Participants ==
In addition to Nolte, the following people also appeared in the documentary:

- Rosanna Arquette
- Jacqueline Bisset
- Powers Boothe
- F. X. Feeney
- James Gammon
- Barbara Hershey
- Paul Mazursky
- Mike Medavoy
- Alan Rudolph
- Ben Stiller

== Reception ==
Roger Ebert awarded the film two stars.
