= Perkins Building =

Historic Building in Tacoma, Washington, United States

Coordinates: 47°15′12″N 122°26′12″W

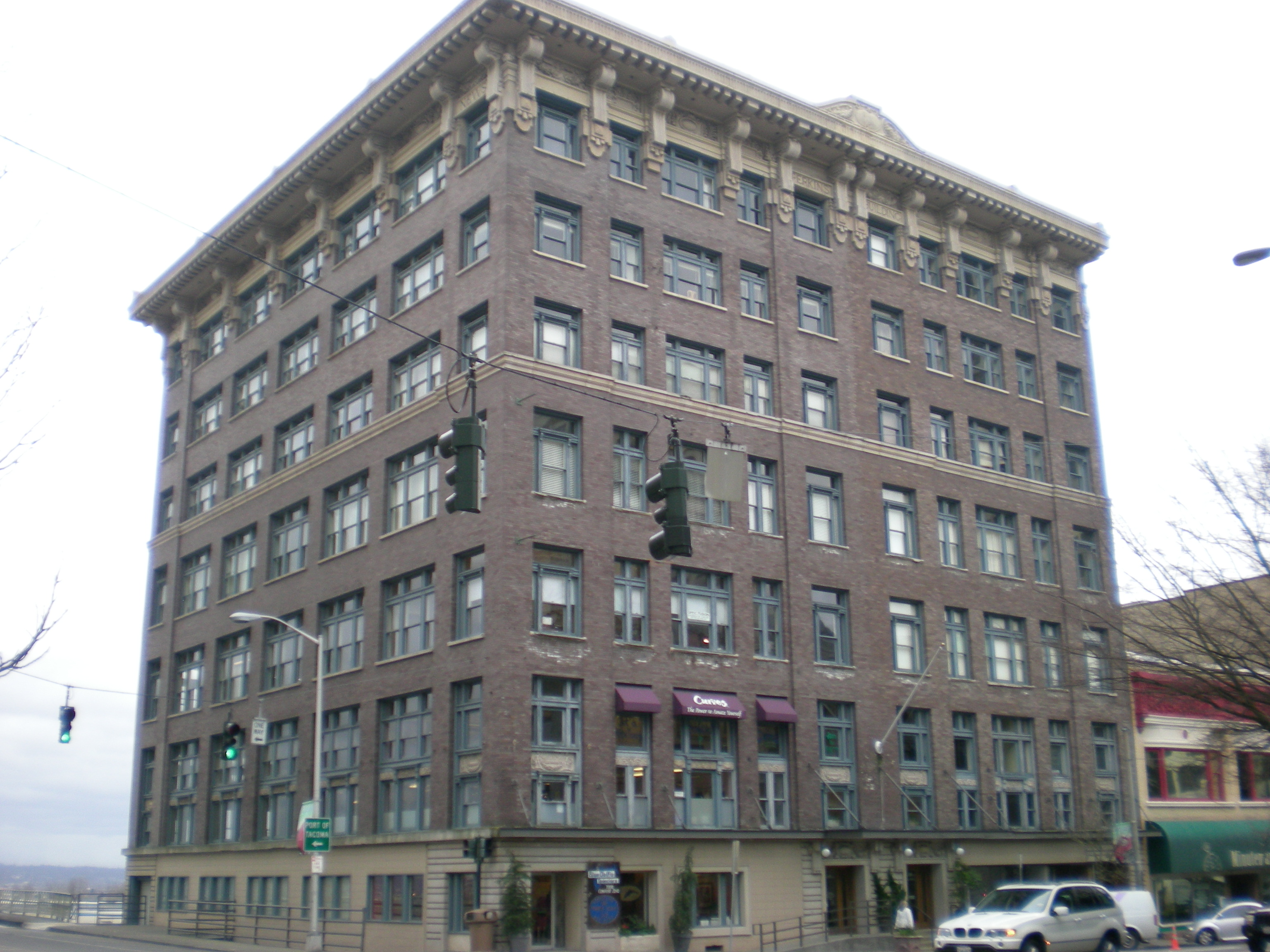
Perkins Building

The Perkins Building is a historic building in Tacoma, Washington, United States. The 8-story building housed the offices of the Tacoma Ledger/Daily News. It was the tallest reinforced concrete building in the Northwest and the first building on West Coast to have a basement parking garage. It was constructed with a rigid frame and brick facade in the Chicago School architectural style.

The building's size was doubled in 1909 with the addition of the southern half at 1105-1107 A Street.

The building is located at 1101 South A Street, Tacoma, Washington.

== Legacy ==
The nascent University of Washington Tacoma opened in the building in 1990. The 8-story structure was chosen in part for its capacity and functioned as UWT's home during the construction of a permanent campus further south. It was named for newspaper founder Sam Perkins and built in 1907 as a newspaper plant for the Tacoma Ledger and Daily News. The paper published from 1880, was sold in 1918 to Frank L. Baker (owner of the Tacoma News Tribune) and continued to be published until 1937.

In the 1990s it was the temporary home to University of Washington Tacoma while their downtown campus was under construction. Top four floors are 1 and 2 bedroom apartments.

A post renovation grand opening was held March 21, 2002. In 2004 the building was converted to residential condominiums, office and retail space at a cost of 9 million dollars.
