= Nick Nolte =

American actor (born 1941)

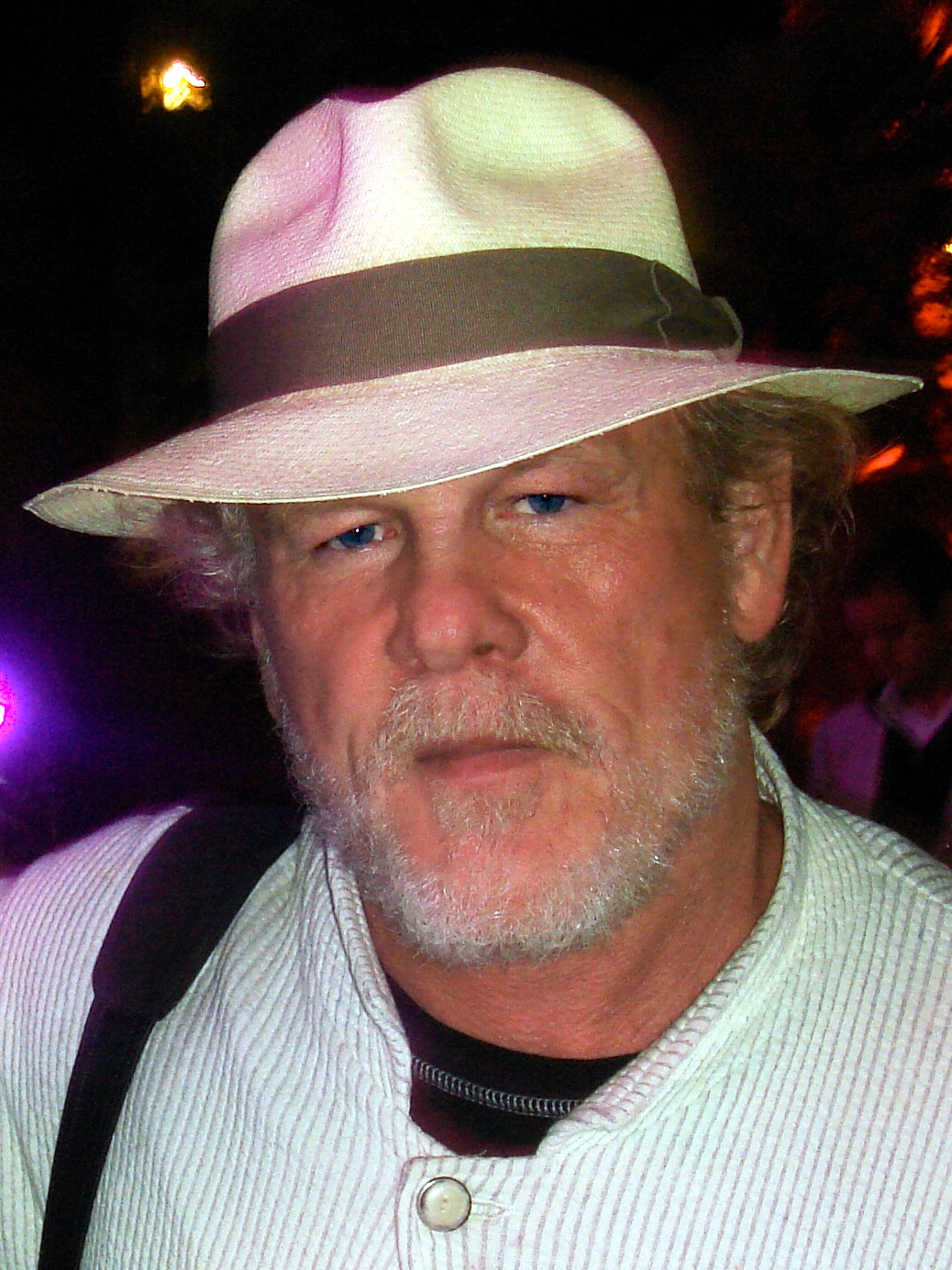
- Nolte in 2008
- Born: Nicholas King Nolte; February 8, 1941 (age 85); Omaha, Nebraska, U.S.
- Occupation: Actor
- Years active: 1969–present
- Spouses: Sheila Page (m. 1966; div. 1970) Sharyn Haddad (m. 1978; div. 1983) Rebecca Linger (m. 1984; div. 1994) Clytie Lane (m. 2016)
- Partners: Karen Eklund (1972–1977); Vicki Lewis (1994–2003)
- Children: 2
- Relatives: Navi Rawat (daughter-in-law)

Nicholas King Nolte (/ˈnoʊlti/ NOHL-tee; born February 8, 1941) is an American actor. Known for his leading man roles in both dramas and romances, he has received a Golden Globe Award as well as nominations for three Academy Awards and a Primetime Emmy Award. Nolte first came to prominence for his role in the ABC miniseries Rich Man, Poor Man (1976) for which he received a Primetime Emmy Award for Outstanding Lead Actor in a Limited Series or Movie nomination. He won the Golden Globe Award for Best Actor – Motion Picture Drama for The Prince of Tides (1991). He has received three Academy Award nominations for The Prince of Tides (1991), Affliction (1998), and Warrior (2011).

His other notable films include The Deep (1977), Who'll Stop the Rain (1978), North Dallas Forty (1979), 48 Hrs. (1982), Cannery Row (1982), Under Fire (1983), Teachers (1984), Down and Out in Beverly Hills (1986), Extreme Prejudice (1987), Three Fugitives (1989) Another 48 Hrs. (1990), Cape Fear (1991), Lorenzo's Oil (1992), Jefferson in Paris (1995), The Thin Red Line (1998), The Good Thief (2002), Hulk (2003), Hotel Rwanda (2004), Over the Hedge (2006), The Spiderwick Chronicles (2008), Tropic Thunder (2008), Cats & Dogs: The Revenge of Kitty Galore (2010), The Company You Keep (2012), Gangster Squad (2013), A Walk in the Woods (2015), Head Full of Honey (2018), and Angel Has Fallen (2019).

His television credits include the HBO series Luck (2011–2012), the Fox miniseries Gracepoint (2014), the Disney+ series The Mandalorian (2019) and Peacock crime drama Poker Face (2023). From 2016 to 2017, Nolte played President Richard Graves in the Epix series Graves for which he was nominated for a Golden Globe Award for Best Actor – Television Series Musical or Comedy.

== Early life ==
Nolte was born in Omaha, Nebraska, on February 8, 1941. (Note: While Nolte's year of birth is given as 1941 on his birth registration in the Nebraska Birth Index (publicly accessible at Ancestry.com), some printed publications have listed 1940 as his year of birth. Most actively maintained online sources list 1941.) His father, Franklin Arthur Nolte (1908–1969), was a farmer's son who ran away from home, nearly dropped out of high school and was a three-time letter winner in football at Iowa State University (1929–31). His mother, Helen (née King; 1914–2000), was a department store buyer, then became an antique dealer, co-owning an antique shop. His father was of German and Scottish ancestry. Nolte's maternal grandfather, Matthew Leander King, invented the hollow-tile silo and was involved in early aviation. Nick Nolte's mother was of mostly Scottish ancestry. His maternal grandmother ran the student union at Iowa State University. He has an older sister, Nancy, who was an executive for the Red Cross.

Nolte attended Kingsley Elementary School in Waterloo, Iowa. He studied at Westside High School in Omaha, where he was the kicker on the football team. He also attended Benson High School, but was expelled for hiding beer before practice and being caught drinking during a practice session. Following his high school graduation in 1959, he attended Pasadena City College in Southern California, Arizona State University in Tempe (on a football scholarship), Eastern Arizona College in Thatcher and Phoenix College in Phoenix. At Eastern Arizona, he lettered in football as a tight end and defensive end, in basketball as a forward, and as a catcher on the baseball team. While in college, he worked for the Falstaff Brewery in Omaha. Poor grades eventually ended his studies, at which point his career in theatre began in earnest.

== Career ==
=== Modeling ===
Nolte was a model in the late 1960s and early 1970s. In a national magazine advertisement in 1972, he appeared in jeans and an open jean shirt for Clairol's "Summer Blonde" hair lightener sitting on a log next to a blonde Anne Powers; and they appeared on the packaging.

=== Early theater and television acting ===
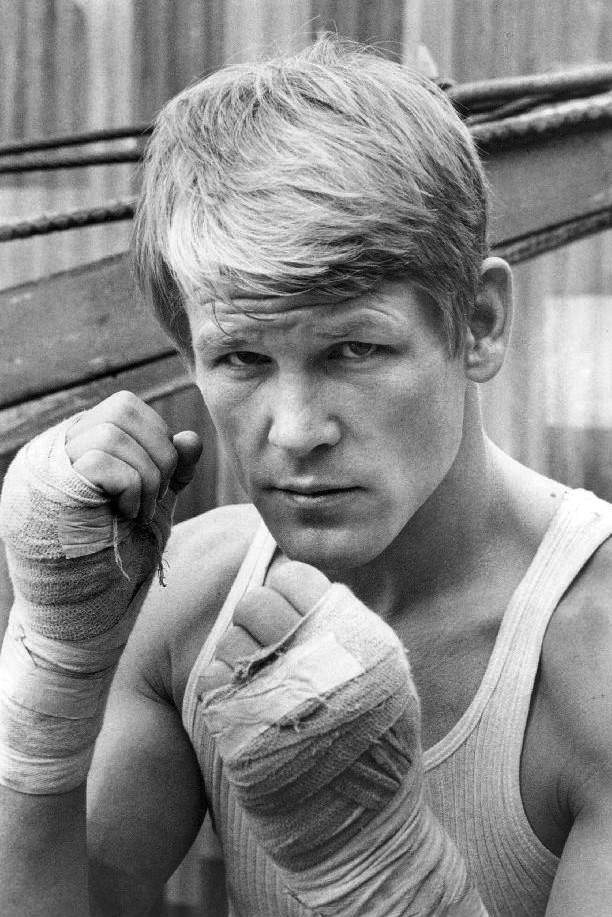
Nolte as Tom Jordache in Rich Man, Poor Man, 1976

After stints at the Pasadena Playhouse and the Stella Adler Academy of Acting and Theatre in Los Angeles, Nolte spent several years traveling the country and working in regional theater, including three years at the Old Log Theater in Minnesota, and a stint at Cafe LaMama in New York.

Nolte first starred in the television miniseries Rich Man, Poor Man, based on Irwin Shaw's 1970 best-selling novel. Later, he appeared in over 40 films, playing a wide variety of characters. Diversity of character, trademark athleticism, and gravelly voice are signatures of his career. In 1973, he guest-starred in the Griff episode, "Who Framed Billy the Kid?", as Billy Randolph, a football player accused of murder. Nolte also made two guest appearances in the television series Barnaby Jones in 1974 and 1975. He co-starred with Andy Griffith in Winter Kill, a television film made as the pilot of a possible television series, and another one, Adams of Eagle Lake, but neither was picked up.

=== Success as a leading man ===
Nolte in the early 90s, when he was named Sexiest Man Alive by People magazine.

Nolte starred in The Deep (1977), Who'll Stop the Rain (1978), and North Dallas Forty (1979) which is based on Peter Gent's novel. In 1982, he starred in 48 Hrs. with Eddie Murphy and Cannery Row with Debra Winger. During the 1980s, he also starred in Under Fire (1983), Teachers (1984), Down and Out in Beverly Hills (1986), Extreme Prejudice (1987), Three Fugitives (1989) and New York Stories (1989). Nolte starred with Katharine Hepburn in her last leading film role in Grace Quigley (1985).

Nolte and Murphy starred again in the sequel Another 48 Hrs. (1990). In 1991, Nolte starred in The Prince of Tides and was nominated for the Academy Award for Best Actor. That same year he starred in Martin Scorsese's remake of Cape Fear with Robert De Niro and Jessica Lange. In 1992, Nolte was named the Sexiest Man Alive by People magazine. When asked about the selection he said "Are you sure you didn't make a mistake? My personal choice is Walter Cronkite."

The 90s saw Nolte starring in Lorenzo's Oil (1992), Jefferson in Paris (1995), Mulholland Falls (1996) and Afterglow (1997). Nolte co-starred in I Love Trouble (1994) with Julia Roberts. Following its release, the Los Angeles Times reported that the two did not get along well and had multiple spats on-set. He received his second Academy Award (Best Actor) nomination for the 1997 film Affliction. Nolte starred with Sean Penn in three films, including U Turn (1997), Terrence Malick's war epic The Thin Red Line (1998), and Gangster Squad (2013).

=== Later acting work ===
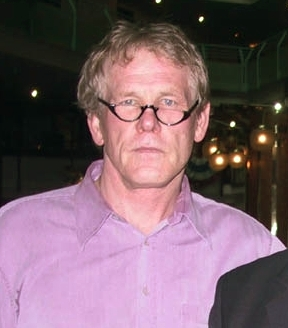
Nolte in 2003

Nolte continued to work in the 2000s, appearing in The Good Thief (2002), Hulk (2003), and taking smaller parts in 2004's Clean and Hotel Rwanda, both performances receiving positive reviews. He also played supporting roles in the drama Peaceful Warrior (2006), the fantasy adventure The Spiderwick Chronicles (2008) and the comedy Tropic Thunder (2008). He provided voice work in the animated films Over the Hedge (2006), Cats & Dogs: The Revenge of Kitty Galore (2010), Zookeeper (2011) and Noah (2014). In 2011, Nolte played recovering alcoholic Paddy Conlon in Warrior, and was nominated for Academy Award for Best Supporting Actor.

Beginning in 2011, Nolte starred with Dustin Hoffman in the HBO series Luck. At the start of production of the second season, however, HBO ended the series after the death of three horses during filming. He appeared in the political thrillers The Company You Keep (2012) and Angel Has Fallen (2019). In 2013, he was in the movie Parker which starred Jason Statham. In 2015, Nolte starred in the biopic comedy-drama A Walk in the Woods and in the revenge thriller Return to Sender.

Nolte at the 83rd Venice International Film Festival in 2026, promoting Company (2026).

From 2016 to 2017, Nolte starred in Graves on Epix about a volatile, hard-drinking former U.S. president who has been retired for 25 years and who has a political epiphany to right the wrongs of his past administration in very public and unpredictable ways. Nolte appeared as recurring character Kuiil in the Disney+ series The Mandalorian in 2019.

Nolte has characterised his acting as "a need in the sense that I can't find anything as complex and interesting to do, but I need it in a story," and saying "I don't want to do reality because reality never runs smooth". He likes to vanish into a role "if the story reaches up to where the great actor is, the great actor disappears, and the story becomes number one, that's as real as it gets".

== Personal life ==
Nolte married Clytie Lane in 2016. He had been previously married to Sheila Page, Sharyn Haddad, and Rebecca Linger. Nolte and Linger have a son, Brawley (b. 1986), an actor who is married to Indian-American actress Navi Rawat. Nolte and Lane have a daughter, Sophia (b. 2007). Sophia played his granddaughter in Head Full of Honey. Nolte and Linger also had a daughter in 1983 who was stillborn. Nolte lived with Karen Eklund, who later sued him for palimony. He has also dated Debra Winger and Vicki Lewis.

=== Legal troubles and substance abuse ===
Nolte is known for his "bad-boy reputation".

In 1961, he was arrested for selling counterfeit draft card documents and given a 45-year prison sentence and a $75,000 fine, but the sentence was suspended. However, the felony conviction left him ineligible for military service. He had felt obligated to serve in the Vietnam War, and says that he felt incomplete as a young man for not going to Vietnam.

On September 11, 2002, Nolte was arrested on suspicion of drunk driving in Malibu, California. Tests later showed that he was under the influence of GHB. Nolte responded that he had "been taking it for four years and I've never been raped." Three days later, he checked himself into Silver Hill Hospital in Connecticut for counseling. On December 12, 2002, he pleaded no contest to charges of driving under the influence. He was given three years' probation, with orders to undergo alcohol and drug counseling with random testing required.

In 2005, The Independent reported that Nolte had struggled with substance abuse for "the majority of his adult life" and had begun abusing alcohol at an early age. After remaining sober for nearly 10 years, he resumed drinking in the late 1990s. Following his 2002 arrest, he again stopped drinking. In 2018, he told The Saturday Evening Post that he did not have a drug problem and that he had been "relatively clean outside of prescription stuff for years".

== Acting credits ==
=== Film ===
Key
†	Denotes films that have not yet been released

Nick Nolte's film appearances
Year	Title	Role	Notes/Ref.
1972	Dirty Little Billy	Town Gang Leader	Uncredited
1973	Electra Glide in Blue	Hippie Kid	Uncredited
1975	Return to Macon County	Bo Hollinger	
1976	Northville Cemetery Massacre	Chris	Voice; Uncredited
1977	The Deep	David Sanders	
1978	Who'll Stop the Rain	Ray Hicks	
1979	North Dallas Forty	Phillip Elliott	
1980	Heart Beat	Neal Cassady	
1982	Cannery Row	'Doc' Eddie Daniels	
1982	48 Hrs.	Inspector Jack Cates	
1983	Under Fire	Russell Price	
1984	Grace Quigley	Seymour Flint	
1984	Teachers	Alex Jurel	
1986	Down and Out in Beverly Hills	Jerry Baskin	
1987	Extreme Prejudice	Texas Ranger Jack Benteen	
1987	Weeds	Lee Umstetter	
1989	Three Fugitives	Daniel James Lucas	
1989	Farewell to the King	Learoyd	
1989	New York Stories	Lionel Dobie	Segment: "Life Lessons"
1990	Everybody Wins	Tom O'Toole	
1990	Q&A	Captain Michael Brennan	
1990	Another 48 Hrs.	Inspector Jack Cates	
1991	Cape Fear	Sam Bowden	
1991	The Prince of Tides	Tom Wingo	
1992	Lorenzo's Oil	Augusto Odone	
1992	The Player	Himself	Cameo
1994	I'll Do Anything	Matt Hobbs	
1994	Blue Chips	Coach Pete Bell	
1994	I Love Trouble	Peter Brackett	
1995	Jefferson in Paris	Thomas Jefferson	
1996	Mulholland Falls	Lieutenant Max Hoover	
1996	Mother Night	Howard Campbell	
1997	Nightwatch	Inspector Thomas Cray	
1997	Afterglow	'Lucky' Mann	
1997	U Turn	Jake McKenna	
1997	Affliction	Wade Whitehouse	Also executive producer
1998	The Thin Red Line	Lieutenant Colonel Gordon Tall	
1999	Breakfast of Champions	Harry Le Sabre	
1999	Simpatico	Vincent Webb	
2000	The Golden Bowl	Adam Verver	
2000	Trixie	Senator Drumond Avery	
2001	Investigating Sex	Faldo	Also producer
2001	James Ellroy's Feast of Death	Himself	Documentary
2002	The Good Thief	Bob Montagnet	
2003	Northfork	Father Harlan	
2003	This So-Called Disaster	Himself	Documentary
2003	Hulk	Dr. David Banner / The Father	
2004	The Beautiful Country	Steve	
2004	Clean	Albrecht Hauser	
2004	Hotel Rwanda	Colonel Oliver	
2005	Neverwas	T.L. Pierson	
2006	Over the Hedge	Vincent	Voice
2006	Paris, je t'aime	Vincent	Segment: "Parc Monceau"
2006	Peaceful Warrior	Socrates "Soc"	
2006	A Few Days in September	Elliott	
2006	Off the Black	Ray Cook	
2006	Buy the Ticket, Take the Ride: Hunter S. Thompson on Film	Narrator	Documentary
2007	Chicago 10	Thomas Horan	Voice; Documentary
2008	The Mysteries of Pittsburgh	Joe Bechstein	
2008	The Spiderwick Chronicles	Mulgarath	
2008	Nick Nolte: No Exit	Himself	Documentary
2008	Tropic Thunder	Sergeant John 'Four Leaf' Tayback	
2008	Wisdom	Himself	Documentary
2009	My Horizon	Lowell	Short film
2010	My Own Love Song	Caldwell	
2010	Huxley on Huxley	Himself	Documentary
2010	Arcadia Lost	Benerji	
2010	Cats & Dogs: The Revenge of Kitty Galore	Butch	Voice
2011	Arthur	Burt Johnson	
2011	Zookeeper	Bernie the Gorilla	Voice
2011	Warrior	Paddy Conlon	
2012	Cold Call	Battleworth	
2012	The Company You Keep	Donal Fitzgerald	
2013	Gangster Squad	Bill Parker	
2013	Parker	Hurley	
2013	Hateship, Loveship	Mr. McCauley	
2013	The Trials of Cate McCall	Bridges	
2014	Noah	Samyaza	Voice
2014	Asthma	Werewolf	Voice
2015	A Walk in the Woods	Stephen Katz	
2015	Run All Night	Eddie Conlon	Uncredited
2015	Return to Sender	Mitchell Wells	
2015	The Ridiculous 6	Frank Stockburn	
2018	The Padre	Nemes	
2018	Head Full of Honey	Amadeus	
2019	Angel Has Fallen	Clay Banning	
2020	Last Words	Shakespeare	
2022	Blackout	DEA Agent Ethan McCoy	
2025	The Golden Voice	Barry	
2025	Die My Love	Harry	
2026	Crime 101	Money	
2026	Company		
2026	Confession	Aleksandr	
TBA	Vested †		Post-production

=== Television ===
Year	Title	Role	Notes
1969	Walt Disney's Wonderful World of Color	Les	Episode: "The Feather Farm"
1973	Griff	Billy Randolph	Episode: "The Framing of Billy the Kid"
1973	Cannon	Ron Johnson	Episode: "Arena of Fear"
1973–1974	Medical Center	Tank / Lou	2 episodes
1974	The Streets of San Francisco	Captain Alan Melder	Episode: "Crossfire"
1974	Emergency!	Dr. Fred	Episode: "The Hard Hours"
1974	Death Sentence	John Healy	Movie
1974	The Rookies	Tommy	Episode: "The Teacher"
1974	Toma	Wally	Episode: "Friends of Danny Beecher"
1974	Chopper One	Bob	Episode: "The Hijacking"
1974	Gunsmoke	Barney Austin	Episode: "The Tarnished Badge"
1974	Winter Kill	Dave Michaels	Movie
1974	The California Kid	Buzz Stafford	Movie
1974–1975	Barnaby Jones	Mark Rainey, Paul Barringer	2 episodes
1975	Adams of Eagle Lake	Officer Jerry Troy	2 episodes
1975	The Runaway Barge	Rou Blount	Movie
1976	Rich Man, Poor Man	Tom Jordache	Miniseries
2011	Ultimate Rush	Narrator	Voice
2011–2012	Luck	Walter James Smith	10 episodes
2014	Gracepoint	Jack Reinhold	Miniseries
2016–2017	Graves	President Richard Graves	20 episodes
2019	The Mandalorian	Kuiil	Voice; 3 episodes
2020	Paradise Lost	Judge Forsythe	10 episodes
2023	Poker Face	Arthur Liptin	Episode: "The Orpheus Syndrome"

=== Theatre ===
Year	Title	Role	Notes
1968	The Rose Tattoo		Phoenix Theater
1972, 1973	The Last Pad		Southwest Ensemble Theatre; Contempo Theatre
2000	The Late Henry Moss	Earl Moss	Post Street Theatre

== Accolades ==
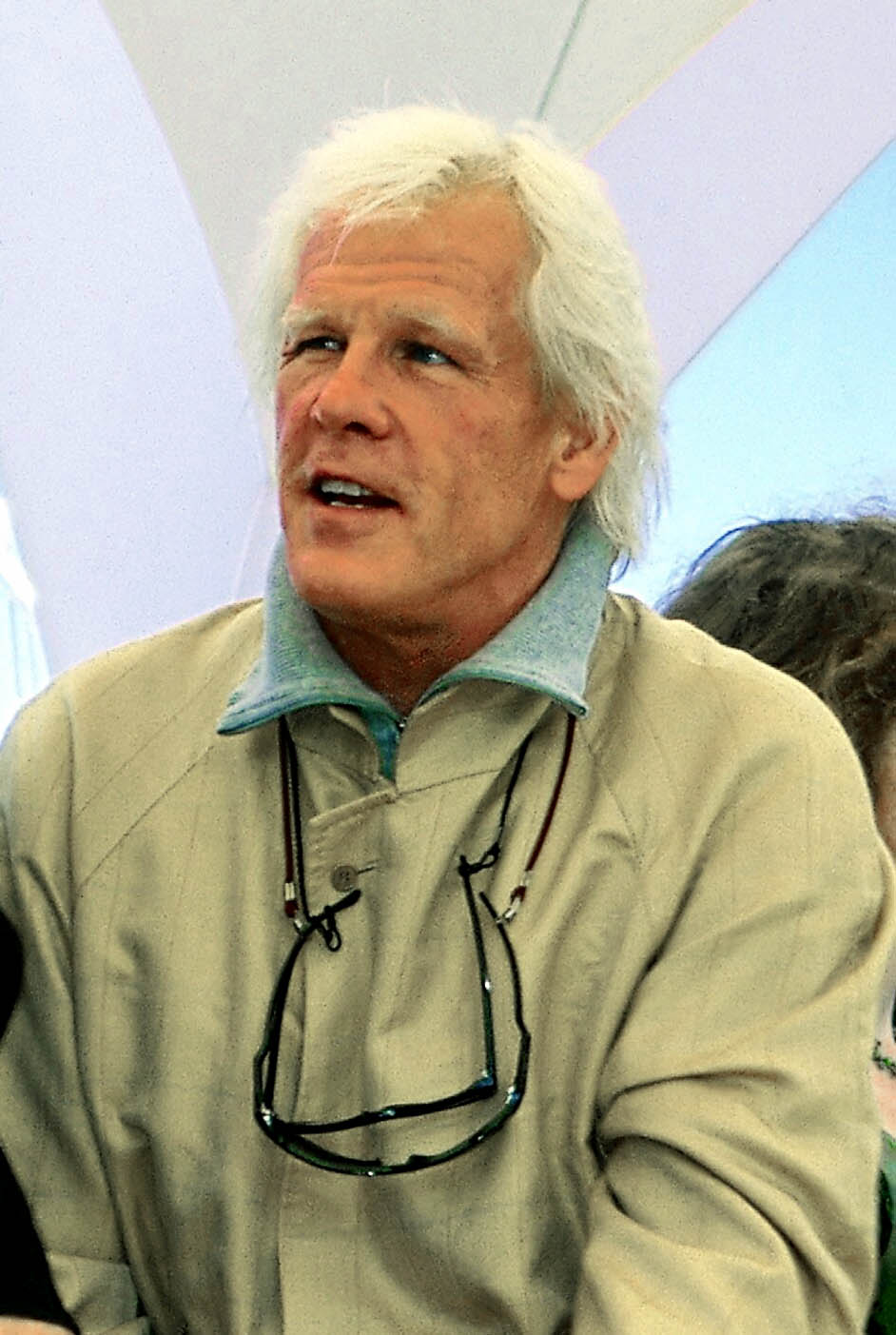
Nolte at 2000 Cannes Film Festival

Year	Association	Category	Nominated work	Result
1976	Primetime Emmy Awards	Outstanding Lead Actor in a Miniseries or Movie	Rich Man, Poor Man	Nominated
1977	Golden Globe Awards	Best Actor – Television Series Drama	Rich Man, Poor Man	Nominated
1979	National Society of Film Critics Awards	Best Actor	Who'll Stop the Rain	3rd place
1979	New York Film Critics Circle Awards	Best Actor	North Dallas Forty	3rd place
1980	National Society of Film Critics Awards	Best Actor	North Dallas Forty	3rd place
1988	Golden Globe Awards	Best Actor – Motion Picture Drama	Weeds	Nominated
1991	Boston Society of Film Critics	Best Actor	The Prince of Tides	Won
1991	Los Angeles Film Critics Association	Best Actor	The Prince of Tides	Won
1991	New York Film Critics Circle Awards	Best Actor	The Prince of Tides	Nominated
1992	Academy Awards	Best Actor	The Prince of Tides	Nominated
1992	Chicago Film Critics Association	Best Actor	The Prince of Tides	Nominated
1992	Golden Globe Awards	Best Actor – Motion Picture Drama	The Prince of Tides	Won
1992	National Society of Film Critics Awards	Best Actor	The Prince of Tides	3rd place
1997	Valladolid International Film Festival	Best Actor	Affliction	Won
1998	New York Film Critics Circle	Best Actor	Affliction	Won
1999	Academy Awards	Best Actor	Affliction	Nominated
1999	Golden Globe Awards	Best Actor – Motion Picture Drama	Affliction	Nominated
1999	Independent Spirit Awards	Independent Spirit Award for Best Male Lead	Affliction	Nominated
1999	National Society of Film Critics	Best Actor	Affliction	Won
1999	Sant Jordi Awards	Best Foreign Actor	Affliction	Won
1999	Satellite Awards	Best Actor – Motion Picture Drama	Affliction	Nominated
1999	Screen Actors Guild Awards	Outstanding Actor in a Leading Role	Affliction	Nominated
1999	Chicago Film Critics Association	Best Supporting Actor	The Thin Red Line	Nominated
2011	Chicago Film Critics Association	Best Supporting Actor	Warrior	Nominated
2011	Denver Film Critics Society	Best Supporting Actor	Warrior	Nominated
2011	San Diego Film Critics	Best Supporting Actor	Warrior	Won
2011	Satellite Awards	Best Supporting Actor	Warrior	Nominated
2011	Screen Actors Guild Awards	Best Supporting Actor	Warrior	Nominated
2012	Academy Awards	Best Supporting Actor	Warrior	Nominated
2012	Broadcast Film Critics Association	Best Supporting Actor	Warrior	Nominated
2012	Online Film Critics Society	Best Supporting Actor	Warrior	Nominated
2017	Golden Globe Awards	Best Actor – Television Series Musical or Comedy	Graves	Nominated

=== Other honors ===
- 1992 – People: Sexiest Man Alive
- 2017 – Star on the Hollywood Walk of Fame
