= Amalia Moretti =

Italian physician and journalist

- Born: Amalia Moretti Foggia; 11 May 1872; Mantua, Italy
- Died: 11 July 1947 (aged 75); Milan, Italy
- Education: University of Bologna
- Occupations: Physician; journalist

Amalia Moretti Foggia (11 May 1872 – 11 July 1947) was an Italian physician and journalist. She is the third woman to graduate in medicine at the University of Bologna. She is also known as Dottor Amal and Petronilla, pseudonyms used by her during her career in journalism.

== Biography ==
=== Early life ===
Amalia Moretti Foggia was born on 11 May 1872 in Mantua in a progressivist and secular family, from a pharmacist and expert herborist Giovanni Battista, who was also a chemistry professor, and Carolina Rinoldi. The couple lost a child years before having Amalia due to smallpox, and when she was nearly one year old she was diagnosed with a strong enteritis, of which she was expected to die for, as at the time there wasn’t any cure for the disease. Although it was a primary cause for infant mortality at the time, thanks to her father's pharmacist abilities and knowledge she was able to recover. In one of her last expected nights her father made a saving potion composed of different kind of herbs, which unexpectedly changed the situation giving her a new beginning. That episode of her life became crucial in defining the intense love she began to have towards nature from that moment until her death. In her autobiography book she states “nature is a friend and saves us if we respect it and if we try to know its secrets and possibilities”.

Young Amalia grew up studying, looking after his little brothers and spending a lot of her free time in the back room of her family's pharmacy, "Farmacia di Santa Lucia", observing his father making potions with herbs and taking notes. She will then eventually publish all that information in her books under the pseudonym of “Dottor Amal”. She developed a very strong relationship with her father, who not only encouraged her to pursue her interest in his same career, but also to become an independent woman. In 1884 Amalia's mother died of Pneumonia and her aunt Cleonice took her under her wing. In that moment her vocation was clear: she would become a doctor and heal others by finding ways to help women as much as possible as they need more help than their men. In those years she had troubles in her relationship with her father and her aunt Cleonice as they had different opinions, both on the kind of studying she would have had and also on christianity. Her father wanted her to continue the lineage of pharmacists Moretti-Foggia, which was three generations long at the time, but her progressive soul was more interested in pursuing a medical career from the beginning. She was destined to look after people, she felt she was not happy being at the pharmacy all the time. Amalia needed to be around people, to travel, to get to know and deeply understand the world and everything around her.

=== Studies ===
Although their relationship was not on the best terms she was able to attend Liceo Ginnasio Virgilio in the company of Ada Sacchi and Elena Casati and graduated with honors on the 15th of July 1891. She loved reading classic poems and novels which gave her a sense of gratitude for the lifestyle she could afford and a sense of duty to listen to the weakest part of the population to defend those people’s rights. During those times she also started developing her opinion regarding the relationship between women and men stating that “in this world the place of women is many steps lower than that of men”.

Even though Giovanni Battista hoped for her daughter to become a pharmacist and take on the family's shop, Amalia preferred to enroll in natural sciences, so he made a deal with her that if she did not have the best grades by the end of the year she would have to switch to pharmaceutical chemistry. She moved to Padua as a natural science student and although universities at the time were no place for women, as an environment filled with men, she was able to gain respect from her male colleagues and build strong friendships. During this time in Padua she lived a romantic relationship with an assistant in the faculty of medicine, Lucio Bellandi.

=== Medical career ===
She gained a scholarship and graduated in natural science in 1895 and decided to apply for medical school at the University of Bologna, where she attended the lectures of clinician Augusto Murri. Her romantic relationship ended badly when her partner was forced to marry another woman but the delusion didn't stop her from achieving her goals. In 1893 she graduated in medicine with honors discussing her thesis, "Le ovaie nelle peritoniti sperimentali", with professor Giovanni Martinotti. Amalia was the third woman to graduate in medicine from the University of Bologna.

She then studied pediatrics (being the first woman to complete that specialization) in Florence at Meyer Children's Hospital, where she met the famous Anna Kuliscioff, founder of the Italian Socialist Party together with Filippo Turati. Her vocation in becoming a pediatrician was due to her inability to bear children, after suffering from a serious peritonitis. In 1899, after her specialization, she moved to Milan and looked for a job with the support of a group of famous feminists, whom she got to know thanks to Anna Kuliscioff: Alessandrina Ravizza, Paolina Shiff, Linda Malnati, and Ersilia Majno Bronzin.

It was Ersilia Majno Bronzin who helped her gain a job as a tax doctor at the Women Workers Society (Società Operaia Femminile). In 1902 she was hired by the Ambulatorio Della Poliambulanza di Porta Venezia where she remained for 40 years working as a pediatrician and in the same year she bought her first house in Via Tadino. Her particular interest was in children suffering from malnutrition. She also helped her patients' mothers gain independence against their violent husbands and cured women workers who were sick because of toxic fumes inhaled in factories. The same year she married doctor Domenico della Rovere, an anatomopathologist, with whom she did not have any children but cared for her young patients as if they were her own. September 12, 1902 the news of their wedding was published in the newspaper "La provincia di Mantova".

=== Amalia as Dottor Amal and Petronilla ===
She gave some speeches at the University of Milan on the topic of tuberculosis and became a personal doctor and friend of the author Ada Negri, with whom she exchanged letters. In Milan she worked as a volunteer giving free care and advice to the people in need. In 1926 she published a column on health and hygiene under the pseudonym "Dottor Amal" in La Domenica del Corriere, after the request of Carlo Zanicotti, the head of the journal. It was Eugenio Balzan, director of Il Corriere della Sera, who introduced her to journalism. The column was titled "Il parere del medico", in which she used anonymity to reach as many readers as possible, being aware of the fact that a male name of doctor would mean more opportunities for her career. Under that name she wrote a book, "Le piante alimentari e medicinali del Dottor Amal", in which she explains the importance of using herbs to treat diseases.

Her contributions, aimed at improving the lives of the disadvantaged, also included recipes published under the pseudonym "Petronilla" (after the Italian name of Maggie, the female main character of the comic strip Bringing Up Father, published in Italy by the Corriere dei Piccoli), to spread knowledge about healthy diets. Her writing style was very thoughtful of her uneducated audience, composed of young inexperienced wives and large families.

She had a simple way of writing, offering humble recipes that were inexpensive, but still had a high nutritional value. In "La massaia scrupolosa" she also gave out household economics advice. Amalia was interpreting two different characters: an emancipated and educated woman and on the other side a housewife, dedicated to her husband and to taking care of the house. Several collections of these recipes were later published separately, including "Ricette" and "Altre ricette" which became best-sellers.

Dottor Amal and Petronilla accompanied readers for 20 years through the dark times of World War II, when food rationing, bombing, malnutrition and hunger were terrible issues. Her column "La parola del medico" was held by Amalia from 1926 until her death. The advice of Dottor Amal spaced from simple daily issues, such as chilblains, to more serious ones, for example tuberculosis or even the unhealthy diet based on polenta, a common meal in poor families.

Two years after her first article, by the 1930s, she opened a new column about nutrition, "Tra i fornelli", in which she showed her knowledge of culinary art. After 1941 Petronilla’s cuisine became synonymous with the cuisine of less, meaning reproducing popular dishes without ingredients that were difficult to find at the time. Her last work, "200 suggerimenti per questi tempi", was written in 1943 during wartime.

=== Death ===
On the 11th of July 1947 she died in her house in Via Sandro Sandri, Milan.

== Acknowledgments ==
On june 18, 2016 the organization ENAIP Veneto dedicated Amalia Moretti Foggia a building in Conegliano, Italy (TV). This corporation manages professional training courses for young people, adults, companies and for apprenticeships. It also provides career guidance and accompaniment services and deals with professional qualifications and retraining. They decided to dedicate a headquarters because she is an example of culture, values and professionalism. She represents a role model for young women being the 3rd woman to graduate in medicine at the University of Bologna.

== Works ==
Amalia's recipes were collected in the following books:

- Petronilla, Ricette
- Petronilla, Altre ricette
- Petronilla, Ancora ricette
- Petronilla, Ricette per questi tempi
- Petronilla, 200 suggerimenti per questi tempi
- Petronilla, Desinaretti per questi tempi
- Petronilla, Ricette per tempi eccezionali
- Dottor Amal, Le piante alimentari e medicinali del dottor Amal

Articles collected in La Domenica del Corriere:

- Dottor Amal, La parola del medico: Camminare (April 28, 1935)
- Petronilla, Tra i fornelli: Un'altra tortina (March 4, 1945)
- Dottor Amal, La parola del medico: Il nostro sangue (April 8, 1945)

Articles collected in Giornale dei Piccoli:

- Dottor Amal, Il consiglio del dottore: Un Bimbo dorme (June 10, 1945)

== Bibliography ==
- Dall'Ara, Renzo (1999). Petronilla e le altre. Il mestolo dalla parte di lei. Tre Lune. ISBN 9788887355048
- Danesi, Brunella. "Amalia Moretti Foggia Della Rovere alias il dottor Amal alias Petronilla". Academia.edu.
- "Foggia Moretti Amalia". Scienza A Due Voci (in Italian). University of Bologna.
- Mafai, Miriam (2008). Pane nero. Donne e vita quotidiana nella seconda guerra mondiale. Ediesse. ISBN 9788823013001.
- Moretti-Foggia, Amalia. Le ricette di Petronilla. Guido Tommasi Editore. ISBN 9788867531912
- Muzzarelli, Maria Giuseppina."Petronilla". Fondazionecorriere.it.
- Riley, Gillian (2007). The Oxford companion to Italian Food. Oxford University Press, USA. ISBN 978-0-19-860617-8
- Schira R., De Vizzi A. (2010). Le voci di Petronilla. Salani Editore. ISBN 9788862562232.
