= Moretti =

Moretti may refer to:

- Moretti (surname), Italian surname

== Characters ==
- Junk Moretti, a character in One Tree Hill
- Kevin Moretti, a character on the television series E.R.
- Klein Moretti, real name Zhou Mingrui, main character of Lord of Mysteries.
- Melanie Moretti, Valerie Bertinelli's character on Hot in Cleveland
- Tony Moretti, a character in the Nine Network's 2008 action drama series The Strip, played by Bob Morley
- Victoria "Vic" Moretti, a character in the Longmire novels and television series
- Vincent Moretti, a main character in the video game A Way Out

== Brands and enterprises ==
- Birra Moretti, Italian beer brand owned by Heineken International
  - Birra Moretti Cup, football tournament
- Moretti glass, another term for what is now called Effetre glass
- Moretti Motor Company, defunct Italian automobile maker
