= Jerry Wexler =

American music producer, journalist (1917–2008)

- Born: Gerald Wexler; January 10, 1917; New York City, U.S.
- Died: August 15, 2008 (aged 91); Sarasota, Florida, U.S.
- Education: Kansas State University (B.A., Journalism, 1946)
- Occupations: Music producer; music journalist
- Years active: 1940s–1990s
- Spouse(s): Shirley Kampf (divorced); Renee Pappas (divorced); Jean Arnold
- Children: 3

Gerald Wexler (January 10, 1917 – August 15, 2008) was a music journalist turned music producer, and was a major influence on American popular music from the 1950s through the 1980s. He coined the term "rhythm and blues", and was integral in signing and/or producing many of the biggest acts of the time, including Ray Charles, the Allman Brothers, Chris Connor, Aretha Franklin, Led Zeppelin, Wilson Pickett, Dire Straits, Dusty Springfield and Bob Dylan. Wexler was inducted to the Rock and Roll Hall of Fame in 1987 and in 2017 to the National Rhythm & Blues Hall of Fame.

== Early life ==
Wexler was born in the Bronx, New York City, the son of a German Jewish father and a Russian Jewish mother; he grew up in the Washington Heights neighborhood of Upper Manhattan. Despite graduating from George Washington High School at the age of 15, he dropped out of the City College of New York after two semesters. In 1935, Wexler enrolled at what became Kansas State University, where he studied intermittently for several years. After being in the U.S. Army, Wexler became a serious student and he graduated from Kansas State with a B.A. degree in journalism in 1946.

== Career ==
External videos
- Rock and Roll; Respect; Interview with Jerry Wexler, 22:01, WGBH Open Archive

During his time as an editor, reporter, and writer for Billboard Magazine, Wexler coined the term "rhythm and blues". In June 1949, at his suggestion, the magazine changed the name of the Race Records chart to Rhythm & Blues Records. Wexler wrote, "'Race' was a common term then, a self-referral used by blacks. ... On the other hand, 'Race Records' didn't sit well. ... I came up with a handle I thought suited the music well—'rhythm and blues'. ... [It was] a label more appropriate to more enlightened times."

Wexler became a partner in Atlantic Records in 1953. Ray Charles, the Drifters and Ruth Brown recorded classic recordings there. With Ahmet and Nesuhi Ertegun, Wexler built Atlantic into a major force in the recording industry.

In the 1960s, he produced recordings by Wilson Pickett and Aretha Franklin, and oversaw production of Dusty Springfield's highly acclaimed Dusty in Memphis and Lulu's New Routes albums. He also cultivated a tight relationship, and a distribution deal, with Stax Records founder Jim Stewart, was an enthusiastic proponent of the then-developing Muscle Shoals Sound and launched the fortunes of Muscle Shoals Sound Studios and the Muscle Shoals Rhythm Section. In 1967 he was named Record Executive of the Year for turning Aretha Franklin's career around. In November 1966, Franklin's Columbia recording contract expired; at that time, she owed the company money because record sales had not met expectations. Working with Wexler and Atlantic, Franklin was "the most successful singer in the nation" by 1968. His work in this decade put Atlantic at the forefront of soul music.

In 1968, he and Ahmet Ertegun signed Led Zeppelin to Atlantic Records on the recommendation of singer Dusty Springfield who had worked with John Paul Jones and from what they knew of the band's guitarist, Jimmy Page, from his performances with the Yardbirds. With its strong catalog, Atlantic Records was purchased by Warner Bros. Records in 1968. Prior to the sale, Wexler persuaded Jim Stewart to sign a contract (that he didn't read), unknowingly giving Atlantic ownership of 97% of the Stax master recordings, without compensation. In 1975, Wexler moved from Atlantic to its parent Warner Records.

In 1979, Wexler produced Bob Dylan's controversial first "born again" album, Slow Train Coming at Muscle Shoals; a single from that album, "Gotta Serve Somebody", won a Grammy Award in 1980. When Wexler agreed to produce, he was unaware of the nature of the material that awaited him. "Naturally, I wanted to do the album in Muscle Shoals—as Bob did—but we decided to prep it in L.A., where Bob lived," recalled Wexler. "That's when I learned what the songs were about: born-again Christians in the old corral. ... I like the irony of Bob coming to me, the Wandering Jew, to get the Jesus feel... [But] I had no idea he was on this born-again Christian trip until he started to evangelize me. I said, 'Bob, you're dealing with a sixty-two-year-old confirmed Jewish atheist. I'm hopeless. Let's just make an album.'"

In 1983, Wexler recorded with English singer and songwriter George Michael. The outcome of these sessions would prove to be an early version of "Careless Whisper", recorded in Muscle Shoals. In 1987, Wexler was inducted into the Rock and Roll Hall of Fame. He retired from the music business in the late 1990s.

For most of the 1990s, Wexler lived on David's Lane in East Hampton, New York where he shared living space with a Chinese family who aided him with daily functions and kept him company.

== Portrayals ==
In Ray, the biopic of Ray Charles, Wexler is portrayed by Richard Schiff. Wexler is portrayed by Marc Maron in the 2021 movie Respect, the life story of Aretha Franklin, and by David Cross in season three of the television show Genius. Tom Thurman produced and directed a documentary film about Wexler, Immaculate Funk (2000). The film takes its name from Wexler's own expression for the Atlantic sound.

== Personal life ==
Wexler was married three times. In 1941, he married Shirley Kampf; they had three children before divorcing. One of the children from that marriage, Anita Wexler, was also a noted record producer. His second wife was Renee Pappas. His third wife was Jean Arnold, a playwright and novelist.

== Death ==
Jerry Wexler died at his home in Sarasota, Florida, on August 15, 2008, aged 91, from congestive heart failure. Asked by a documentary filmmaker several years before his death what he wanted on his tombstone, Wexler replied: "Two words: 'More bass'."

== See also ==
- Muscle Shoals, Alabama
- Muscle Shoals Rhythm Section
- Muscle Shoals Sound Studios
- FAME Studios
- Category:Albums produced by Jerry Wexler
