= Cappy Thompson =

American artist (born 1952)

- Born: January 22, 1952 (age 74); Alexandria, Virginia
- Education: Evergreen State College
- Known for: Glass art, enamel work
- Notable work: Dreaming of Spirit Animals; Gathering the Light

Cappy Thompson (born January 22, 1952) is an American glass artist known for her reverse-painted enamel work. Her work often incorporates narrative imagery drawn from a range of sources, including religious traditions, folklore, and medieval legend. She lives in Seattle, Washington.

== Early life and education ==
Cappy Thompson was born January 22, 1952 in Alexandria, Virginia. She graduated in 1976 from The Evergreen State College, where she studied painting and printmaking.

== Career ==
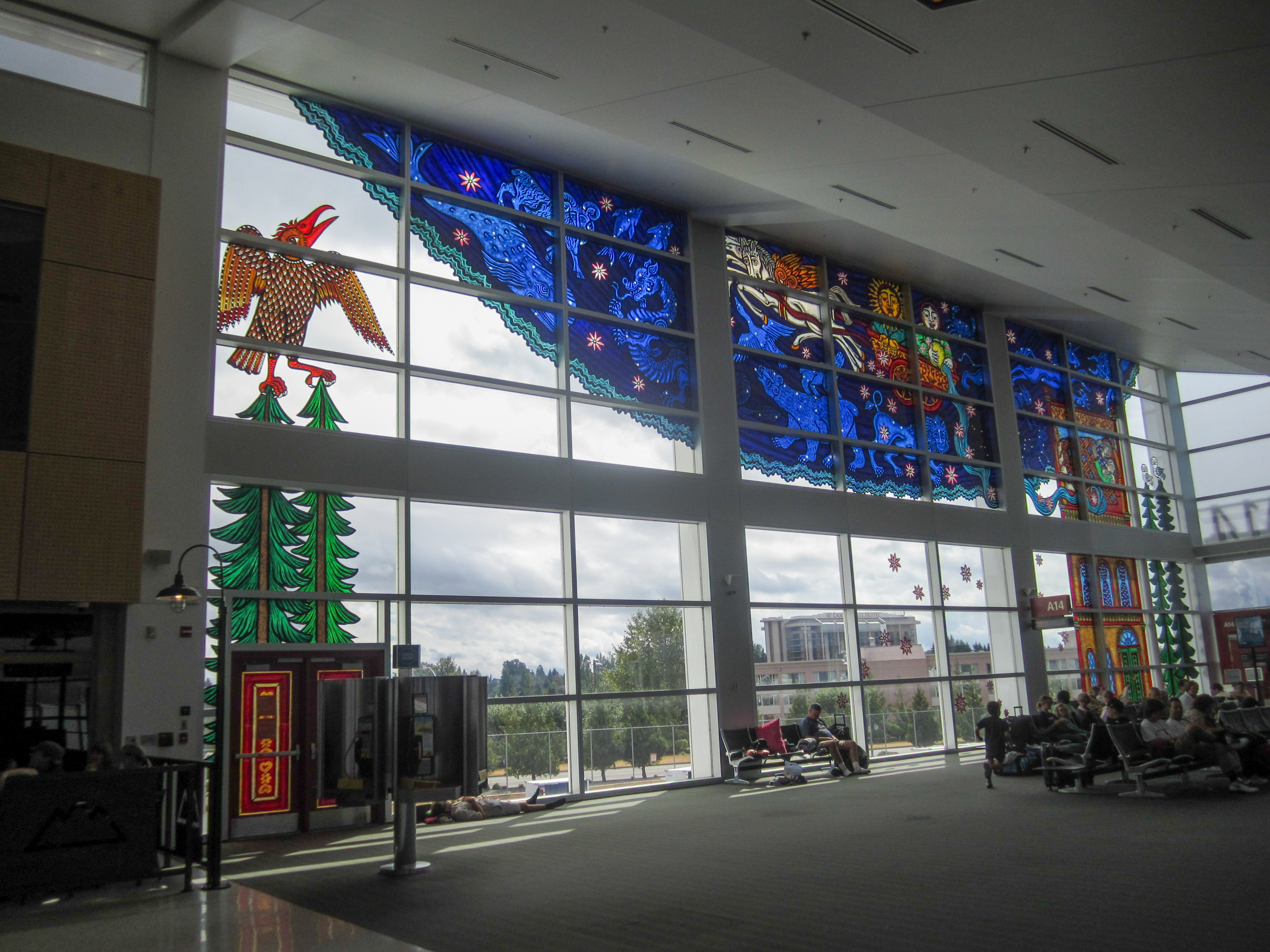
Dreaming of Spirit Animals, Sea-Tac Airport

Thompson has been an artist in residence at Pilchuck Glass School and is a recipient of the school’s Libenský Award. She has taught at the Penland School of Crafts in North Carolina, the Pratt Fine Arts Center in Seattle, Washington and UrbanGlass in Brooklyn, New York.

Her best-known public works include Dreaming of Spirit Animals at Seattle-Tacoma International Airport and Gathering the Light in the lobby of the Museum of Glass in Tacoma.

== Artistic style ==
Thompson’s work draws on a range of sources, including Hindu and Buddhist traditions, fables, and medieval legends, and often incorporates narrative imagery. She began her career as a painter of stained glass and uses transparency as a central feature of her work. Her glass vessels are typically reverse-painted using enamel techniques. She has been described as a leading American artist working in transparent enamelling.

== Solo exhibitions ==
Thompson has held solo exhibitions, including at the Montgomery Museum of Fine Arts, Alabama, in 2006.

== Honors and awards ==
Selected awards include:

- John Hauberg Fellowship, Pilchuck Glass School (2001, 2012)
- Artist Trust Fellowship, Seattle, Washington (1997)
- Artist in Residence, Toyama City Institute of Glass Art, Toyama, Japan (1995)
- Fellowship for the Visual Arts, National Endowment for the Arts (1990)

== Personal life ==
Thompson lives in Seattle, Washington.
