= Buy the Ticket, Take the Ride: Hunter S. Thompson on Film =

- Film poster
- Directed by: Tom Thurman
- Written by: Tom Marksbury
- Produced by: Christopher Black; Tom Thurman
- Starring: Hunter S. Thompson; Johnny Depp; Bill Murray; John Cusack; Gary Busey; William F. Buckley; Harry Dean Stanton; Benicio del Toro
- Narrated by: Nick Nolte
- Release date: October 16, 2006 (Hollywood Film Festival)
- Running time: 73 minutes
- Country: United States
- Language: English

Buy the Ticket, Take the Ride: Hunter S. Thompson on Film is a 2006 documentary about writer Hunter S. Thompson directed by Tom Thurman.

== Overview ==
Interviews with Hunter S. Thompson's inner circle of family and friends.
