= Appalatin =

- Origin: Louisville, Kentucky
- Genres: Appalachian / Latin
- Years active: 2006–present
- Label: CD Baby
- Members: Yani Vozos; Marlon Obando; Steve Sizemore; Fernando Moya; Luis De Leon; Jose Oreta
- Past members: Luke McIntosh; Mario Cardenas; Mason Roberts
- Website: www.appalatin.com

Appalatin is a six-member Appalachian / bluegrass / Latin band based out of Kentucky. The band's name is a portmanteau of Appalachia and Latin. The band is known for playing bluegrass and Americana standards such as "My Old Kentucky Home", but with traditional Central and South American instruments, such as the pan flute, charango, and conga, as well as traditional North American instruments such as harmonica and banjo. Appalatin also plays Latin standards, such as "Guantanamera".

The members of Appalatin met by chance while in Louisville, Kentucky. They began performing together as a band in 2006 for Heine Brothers Coffee.

Appalatin has released 3 albums: "Appalatin" (2011), "Waterside" (2013), and "Vida" (2018). It was awarded the 2014 Americana Award by the Louisville Music Awards Academy and the 2018 Best Latin Artist by the Latin Music Awards of Kentucky.
