= Lino Tagliapietra =

Italian glass artist (born 1934)

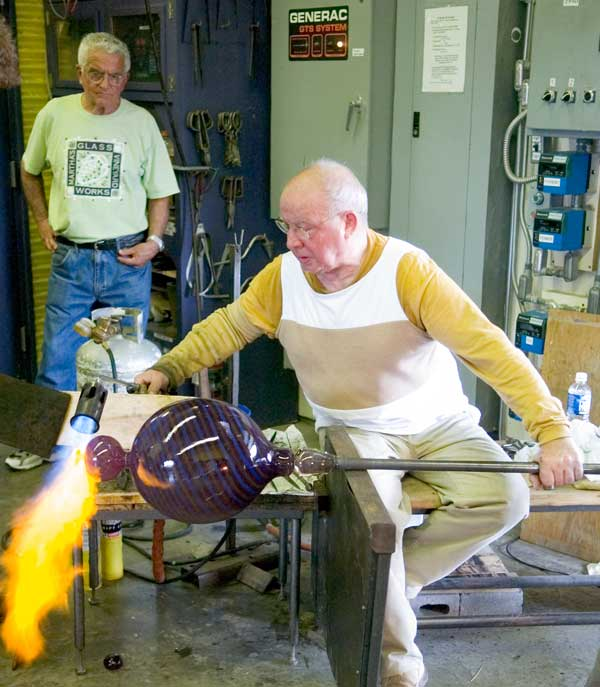
Lino Tagliapietra (foreground) and Checco Ongaro

Lino Tagliapietra (born 1934) is an Italian glass artist originally from Venice, who has also worked extensively in the United States. As a teacher and mentor, he has played a key role in the international exchange of glassblowing processes and techniques between the principal American centers and his native Murano, "but his influence is also apparent in China, Japan, and Australia—and filters far beyond any political or geographic boundaries."

== Training ==
Tagliapietra was born August 10, 1934, in an apartment on the Rio dei Vetri (which translates literally in "glass canal", or more broadly in "glass street" considering the intense use of waterways in the Venetian Lagoon as means for transport of goods and people) in Murano, Italy, an island with a history of glass-making that dates from 1291. It provided an ideal educational environment for Tagliapietra to develop his techniques and glass artistry. On June 16, 1946, at the age of 12, he was apprenticed to the glass maestro Archimede Seguso. He began in the Galliano Ferro factory as a water carrier and after two years was allowed to participate in glass manufacturing for the first time, applying ribbing to a single piece. He educated himself in modern art and at the Venice Biennales saw the work of Mark Rothko, Barnett Newman, and Ellsworth Kelly. For the history or glass art he used the local resources of the Murano Glass Museum, and his attempts to recreate historical models expanded his vocabulary as well. Nine years later, at the age of 25, he earned the rank of maestro. He interrupted his years of training to complete his compulsory service in the Italian military in 1952-54. On 13 September 1959 he married Lina Ongaro, whose family had been involved in Venetian glass production for centuries.

== Career ==
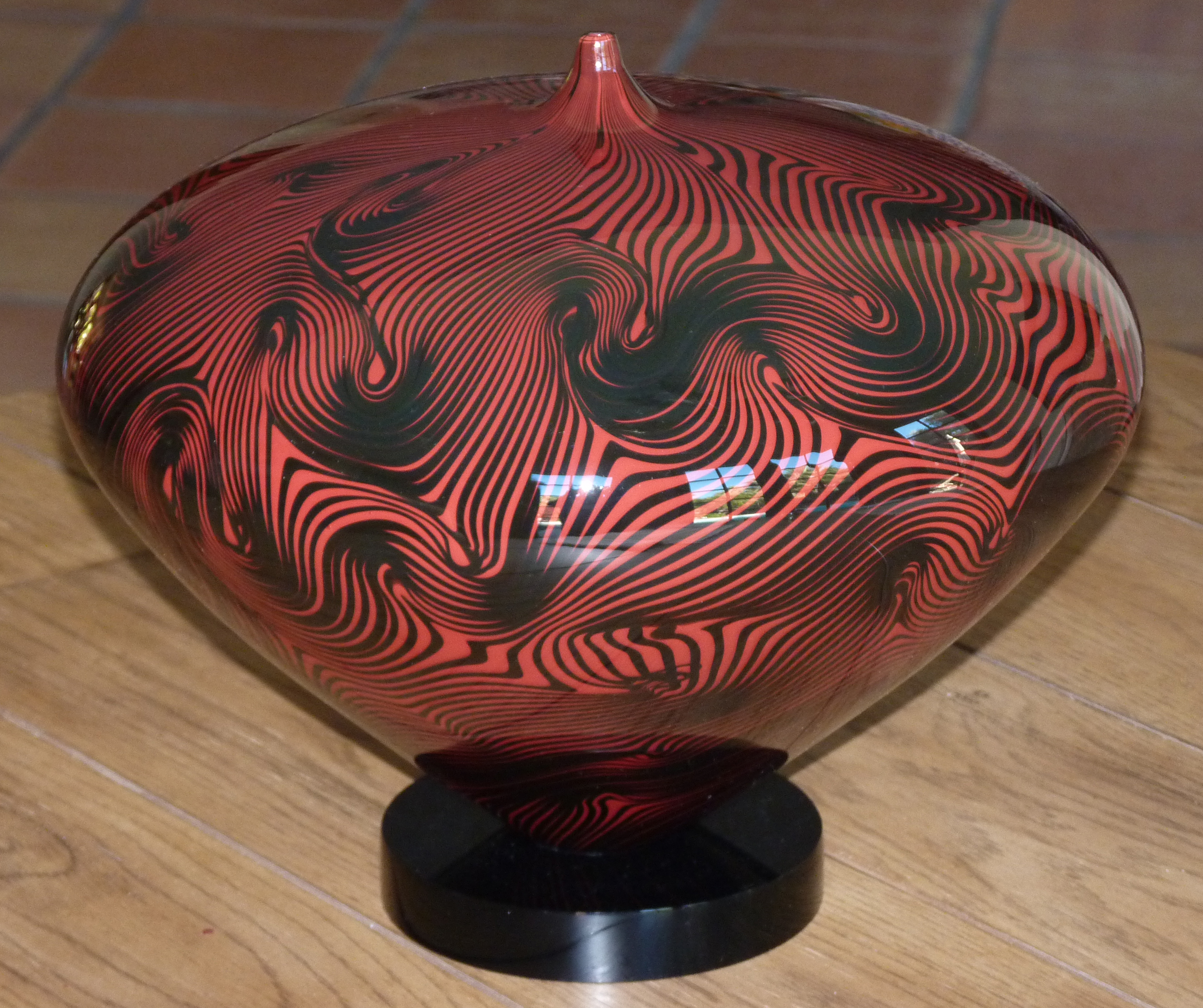
Lino Tagliapietra - Hopi vase

For the next 25 years Tagliapietra worked in association with several of Murano's most important glass factories, including Vetreria Galliano Ferro, Venini & C., La Murrina, Effetre International, where he was Artistic and Technical Director from 1976 to 1989, and EOS Design nel Vetro. At Murrina he developed his "Saturn" design, which became his "personal emblem". His influence on the American art glass studio movement is primarily attributed to his colleague Dale Chihuly. In 1968 Chihuly visited Murano, where he gave Tagliapietra studio time to develop his own pieces. He taught Tagliapietra his techniques, which Tagliapietra taught to other glass maestri, including Pino Signoretto, and Tagliapietra taught Chihuly the Venetians' secrets in turn. A 2001 film documents this collaboration: Chihuly and the Masters of Venice.

Tagliapietra taught workshops at La Scuola Internazionale del Vetro (Murano) in 1976, 1978, and 1981, where artists and blowers worked on an equal footing. In 1979 and 1980, he taught at the Pilchuck Glass School in Washington state, which initiated an ongoing exchange of knowledge between the Italian maestri and American glass artists, groups that in the past had guarded their techniques as trade secrets. He has returned to Seattle and Pilchuk repeatedly.

In the 1980s, Tagliapietra transitioned from traveling, teaching, and designing for commercial glass manufacturers to creating individual pieces of art as an independent studio artist. He had his first solo show at Traver Gallery in Seattle in 1990. His technical resources continuously expanded to combine modern experimentation "carving, blowing, caning, layering, casing, and trailing along with the elaborate Italian tricks so sought after for centuries: battuto, zanfirico, filigrano, reticello, pulegoso, martelé, inciso and incalmo..." He has emphasized his own independent approach to design. He told one interviewer: "I'm totally open. I think that what I like to do the most is research. I don't want to represent Venetian technique only–even though I was born with it.... Your style is what you are. My older work has a different spirit and my expression has changed."

Though colored glasses have been available since the 1970s, Tagliapietra has continued to create his own colors and use them almost exclusively in his own work. He has said they allow him to maintain control and that they are "softer, more human, more ... Venetian".

According to Rosa Barovier Mentasti, a leading historian of glass:

He was taught and has taught himself the glass art in light of the particular Venetian sensibility to glass, aimed at appreciating its characteristics as an absolutely unique material that can be melted, blown and molded when hot.... In his work, it is also difficult, if not impossible, to separate the design stage from the technical-experimental, in that he thinks in glass; that is, he conceives the work not only in terms of its aesthetic qualities but simultaneously in the methods of its production.

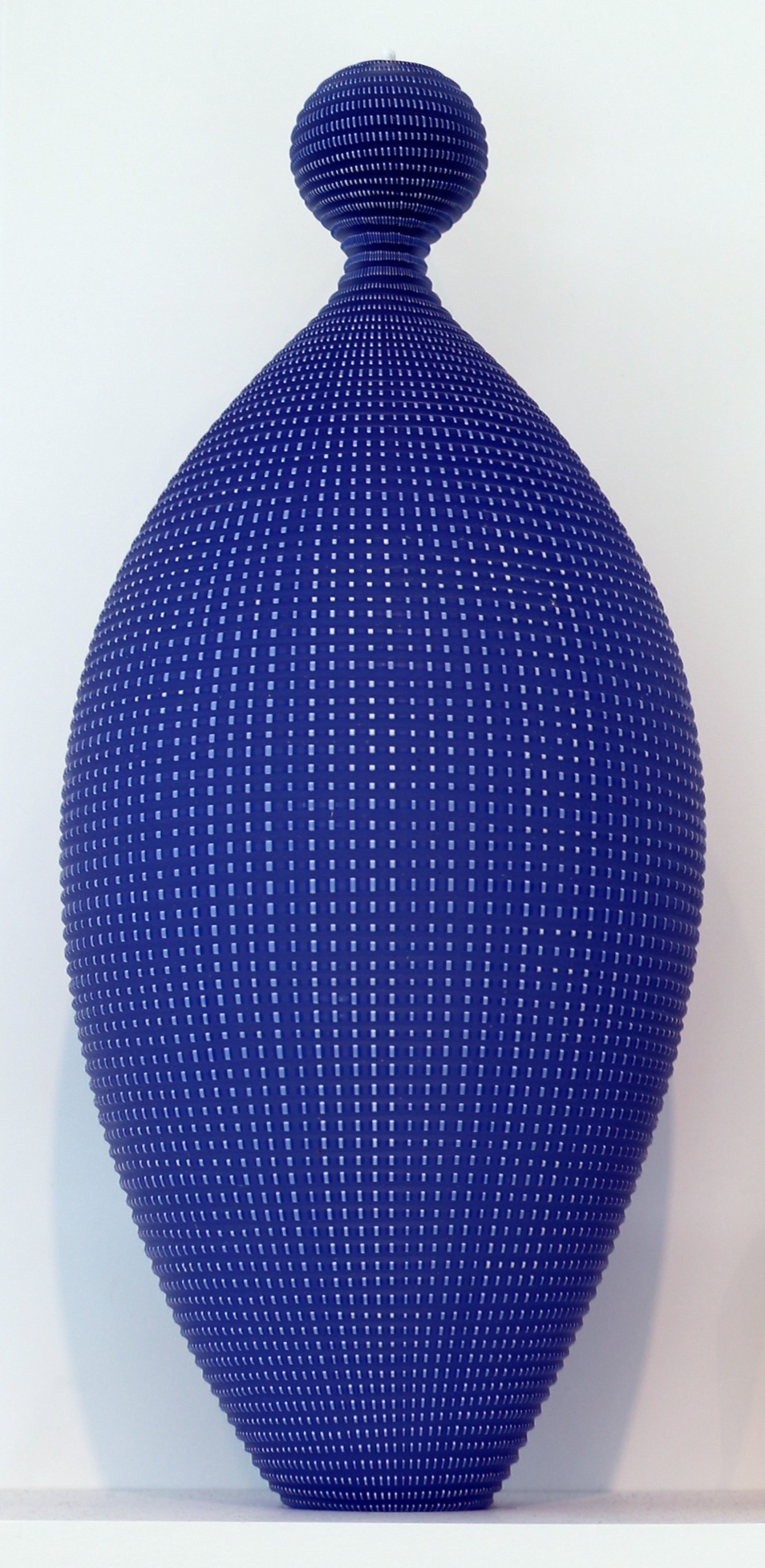
Tholtico, 1998

In Giovanni Sarpelon's view, Tagliapietra has "a close and almost symbiotic rapport with glass" that erases the distinction between the craftsman and the artist. There is no question in his work "whether the fact that a work is made of glass is purely incidental or whether it is essential to its creation." While he may sketch designs in advance, his approach is to seek "spontaneous perfection" during the glassblowing process. As one profiler has written, "most of his decisions are made in front of the furnace".

In 1998, he undertook a challenging project with Steuben Glass Works that required him to work without color usingthe unfamiliar batch glass that Steuben has developed for its own production.

In 2008, Art Guide Northwest reported:

By adopting a boundary-free, global attitude about skill sharing and the evolution of artistic vision in glass, Tagliapietra became the single most important living figure for glass: his friend Dale Chihuly freely called him "the greatest glassblower in the world."

The Istituto Veneto di Scienze, Lettere ed Arte mounted the first exhibition of his work in his homeland in the spring of 2011, a retrospective of his entire career including works from as far back as the 1950s. Its center gallery held Avventura, a large black shadowbox displaying a collection of over 100 avventurina vessels made of glass mixed with copper particles. According to GLASS Quarterly, "the gilded vases and pitchers emulate Roman amphorae, vessel forms far older than the Murano glassblowing tradition and its challenging avventurina technique." Another 16 pieces under the title Masai d’Oro "inspired by the deeply symbolic shields used by the Masai peoples in Kenya and Tanzania".

He spent a week in October 2012 at the MIT Glass Lab, working with glass artists and educators to explore computer modeling and folding techniques. He has been working with MIT staff for several years to develop software for computer-aided design, known as Virtual Glass, attempting to improve advance planning to reduce costs, since both the materials and facilities rentals that glassblowing requires are expensive.

In November 2011, he inaugurated the glass studio at the Chrysler Museum of Art with a public demonstration in advance of its formal opening. He created "an impossibly large and complicated piece, which took a team of glassblowers more than an hour." In the spring of 2012, he participated in glassblowing demonstrations to mark the tenth anniversary of the founding of The Glass Furnace, an international non-profit glass school in Istanbul.

In June 2012, the Columbus Museum of Art announced it had acquired a glass installation piece by Tagliapietra, Endeavor, an "armada of thirty-five boats suspended from the ceiling" that instantly became "an iconic part of the Museum's collection."

Tagliapietra serves on the board of directors of UrbanGlass, a resource center for glass artists in Brooklyn, NY.

From October 29, 2016 – July 16, 2017, the Philadelphia Museum of Art exhibited Lino Tagliapietra Painting in Glass which highlighted five works from his panel series.

== Awards ==
- 2013: Visionary Award, Art Palm Beach
- 1998: The Libensky Award, Chateau Ste Michelle Vineyard and Winery and Pilchuck Glass School
- 1997: Bavarian State Gold Medal for Crafts (Urkunde Goldmedaille), Germany
- 1997: The Glass Art Society Lifetime Achievement Award
- 1996: Urban Glass Award for Preservation of Glassworking Techniques
- 1996: The 11th Rakow Commission, The Corning Museum of Glass

== Sources ==
- Carl I. Gable, Murano Magic: Complete Guide to Venetian Glass, its History and Artists (Schiffer, 2004), ISBN 0-7643-1946-9
- Claudia Gorbman, Maestro: Recent Work by Lino Tagliapietra ([Tacoma] Museum of Glass, 2012), ISBN 978-0295992266
- Rosa Barovier Mentasti, ed., Lino Tagliapietra: From Murano to Studio Glass, 1954-2011 (Marsilio, 2011), ISBN 978-8831708173
- Susanne K. Frantz, Lino Tagliapietra in Retrospect: A Modern Renaissance in Italian Glass (Museum of Glass, Tacoma, in association with University of Washington Press, 2008), ISBN 978-0295988252
- Giovanni Sarpellon, Lino Tagliapietra Glass (Arsenale Editrice, 2006), ISBN 978-8877431493
