= Ada Sacchi Simonetta =

Italian librarian and women's rights activist (1874–1944)

- Born: Ada Sacchi; 19 April 1874; Mantua, Italy
- Died: 13 January 1944 (aged 69); Niteròi, Brazil
- Occupations: Librarian, Suffragist
- Spouse: Quintavalle Simonetta (m. 1899)

Ada Sacchi Simonetta (19 April 1874 – 13 January 1944) was an Italian librarian and women's rights activist. During her tenure as the head of the public library and museums in Mantua, she introduced new services and programs to make the library more democratic and reach more people, including Sunday hours, a public card catalogue, and hospital libraries for soldiers during World War I. Driven by the difficult economic conditions faced by libraries in Italy, Sacchi founded a national association for library and museum officials, which advocated for library and museum interests in Italy, and eventually became part of the Italian Library Association. Sacchi was also active in the Italian women's rights movement, founding the Mantuan chapter of the Association for the Woman and serving as president of the Italian Federation for Women's Suffrage and Civil and Political Rights.

== Biography ==
=== Early years ===
Ada Sacchi was born on 19 April 1874, in Mantua, Italy, to Achille Sacchi and Elena Casati. She was the youngest of 10 children. After Elena Casati died in 1882, English writer and philanthropist Jessie White Mario became a maternal figure for Sacchi. Sacchi graduated from high school in 1890 and moved to Genoa, where she finished her studies and graduated from college in 1898. With her sisters Maria and Stella, Sacchi was one of the first 257 female college graduates in Italy. In 1899, Sacchi married teacher Quintavalle Simonetta. They had three children: Bono (1903–1992), Elena (1905), and Alberto (1907–1910). Until 1902, Sacchi worked as a teacher in Modena and Mantova.

=== Library work ===
==== Direction of the Mantua Public Library ====
On 11 January 1902, Sacchi became the head of the public library and municipal museums in Mantua, a position she held until 1925. Through her work in libraries, Sacchi wanted to make what had previously been an elite institution more democratic, in the tradition of the Italian Risorgimento, opening it up to more people. She sought to increase the number of readers, books read, loans, and new purchases. By the end of 1902, Sacchi had increased the number of readers to 6,509, from 2,918 in 1900; the number of books read at the library to 7,862 from 3,695; and the number of loans to 843 from 425. Sacchi introduced operational innovations, such as Sunday hours in 1903, which brought in more labourers to the library, and, around 1909, a card catalogue that the public could consult themselves. She also proposed creating a popular section of the library in 1909, although this proposal was ignored until 1912. Throughout all of her efforts, Sacchi found that the town government showed disinterest in and a lack of support for her work. She was also paid less than the male vice-director at her library.

==== Association for library and museum officials ====
Driven by the difficult conditions for libraries in Italy, Sacchi decided that it was time to start an organization for public libraries, in order to broaden the debate about the future of the Italian public library system and advocate for equitable compensation from town governments. She sent a letter to 120 public library directors across the country, calling for the formation of such an organization, and in June 1911, Sacchi convened the first national meeting of public libraries. The National Association for Library and Town and Provincial Museum Officials was formed, and Sacchi became the first president. One of the first acts of the organization was to send to local governments an analysis of the current environment for public libraries in Italy, noting the lack of library personnel and advocating for libraries to be considered vital for education. They also demanded more financial support.

In December 1915, the association suspended its activities because of World War I, although in 1917, they succeeded in getting an exemption from paying postal fees for sending books between libraries. During World War I, Sacchi created little libraries for wounded soldiers in the Mantua hospital. In 1917, 6,000 books were distributed, and the library was opened in the evenings for those soldiers convalescing in Mantua, outside of the hospital. In 1920, Sacchi resigned from her position as president of the association, although she continued to remain active in the organization.

==== National library activity ====
In 1923, Sacchi authored an article in Il Popolo d'Italia, "The State of Public Libraries in Italy," in which she reaffirmed the needs of Italian libraries: a reorganization of the whole library system, administrative autonomy for libraries in provincial capitals, the establishment of schools of library science, and greater collaboration between schools and libraries. She also came out against the creation of school libraries, saying that she did not feel like they were effective.

Although Sacchi did not attend the annual meeting of the association in 1925 due to poor health, the association's president Giuseppe Agnelli read her speech on "Relations between the State and Public and Provincial Libraries and Museums with Regard to their Operation." In this speech, she repeated the importance of one state body being in charge of these cultural institutions. In 1928, she delivered a speech at the Second National Congress of Public and Provincial Librarians and Museum and Archive Directors, "Rules and Operation of Public Libraries," reaffirming the request for a library in every town. At this meeting, the association founded by Sacchi voted to merge with state libraries in a new association. In 1929, Sacchi attended the "First World Congress of Libraries and Bibliography," at which the new Italian Library Association was launched (officially in 1930). Sacchi contributed a paper Cataloguing and the Possibility of Consulting University Theses, in which she outlined her vision for the free circulation of research to support scientific progress. She argued that theses authored by students remained in "the cemeteries of the University Archives", and she wanted to make them available at university libraries by creating national thesis indices, which could then be distributed to all provincial libraries, creating international exchanges.

=== Women's rights ===
Both Sacchi and her sister Beatrice were involved in the women's rights movement. In 1909, Sacchi founded the Mantuan chapter of the Association for the Woman, which advocated for suffrage, the abolition of prostitution, divorce, and careers for women. She also started an evening school for women, an evening sewing school, a school for nurses, and other initiatives for women and children.

Thanks to Sacchi's efforts, Mantua became a centre for pragmatic feminism in Lombardy, sometimes at odds with the more scientific feminism of Rome, where Sacchi's sister Beatrice was active. In 1917, the two groups diverged when the group from Mantua, with Sacchi at the head, disassociated itself from the official pro-suffrage platform of the Association, opposing extending the vote for women because they thought that, in the pre-war period, Italian women's neutrality might lead the country into war.

Sacchi was one of the twelve Italian delegates at the Ninth Congress of the International Women Suffrage Alliance, held in Rome in 1923. In 1928, she became president of the Italian Federation for Women's Suffrage and Civil and Political Rights (FISEDD), the Italian section of IWSA.

=== Later years ===
During the regime of Benito Mussolini, Sacchi did not become a member of the fascist party. As a result, she was forced to resign from the library, and in 1935, she was dismissed from her position as president of FISEDD. In 1939, Sacchi and her family moved to Niteròi, Brazil, where she died in 1944.

== Works ==
- Saggio intorno al pessimismo dei poeti greci, Mantova 1902
- Relazioni fra lo Stato e le biblioteche e musei comunali e provinciali in ordine al loro funzionamento, in Bollettino del Museo civico di Padova, n.s., II (1926), 1-4, pp. 115–121
- L'Associazione per la donna di Mantova. Cenno riassuntivo (anni 1909–1926), Bologna 1927
- Catalogazione e possibilità di consultazione delle tesi universitarie, Roma 1930
- Federazione italiana per il suffragio e i diritti civili e politici delle donne. Relazione morale e finanziaria della Presidenza centrale sul biennio 1930-31, Mantova 1932
- Federazione italiana per i diritti della donna. Relazione morale e finanziaria sul biennio 1932-33, Mantova s.d.
