= Francesco Saverio Moretti =

Italian painter

Francesco Saverio Moretti (1800 – 5 May 1866) was an Italian painter active in the Marche region.

He was born in Recanati, in the province of Macerata. He trained initially locally under Serafino Maritozzi, then in 1825, the priest Roberto Carradori of the Oratory of Saint Philip Neri patronized his enrollment at the Academy of St Luke in Rome, then under Vincenzo Camuccini. However, his main training was in the studio of Tommaso Minardi located in Palazzo Colonna. Among possible contemporaries of Moretti in that studio were other painters of the Marche, such as Domenico Bernardi of Corinaldo, Ercole Morelli of Ancona, Francesco Cardi of Ascoli, Emidio Paci di Ascoli, Alessandro Nardoni of Ascoli Luigi Castelli of Loreto, Alessandro Finardi of Ancona, and Domenico Ventura of Macerata. Minardi at the time was following a neo-raphaelesque esthetic style along the lines of Purismo.

After 12 years in Rome, in 1938 he received a commission to decorate rooms in the Palazzo Carradori of Recanati, to celebrate the marriage of Count Antonio with Laura, the daughter of Prince Simonetti. he soon had a commission to decorate the Villa Koch, the former Palazzo dei Filippini, Palazzo Venieri, and the Palazzo Antici. In 1856 and 1858, there was attempts to include him among the artists restoring the Raphael Rooms in Vatican, but he remained in Recanati. He developed an eye malady during his later years.
