= Extreme Prejudice =

Extreme Prejudice may refer to:

- Extreme Prejudice (film), a 1987 American action film
- "Extreme Prejudice" (NCIS), a 2012 episode of NCIS

== See also ==
- Project GAMMA § Soldiers tried, for the phrase 'terminate with extreme prejudice'.
