= Bridge of Glass =

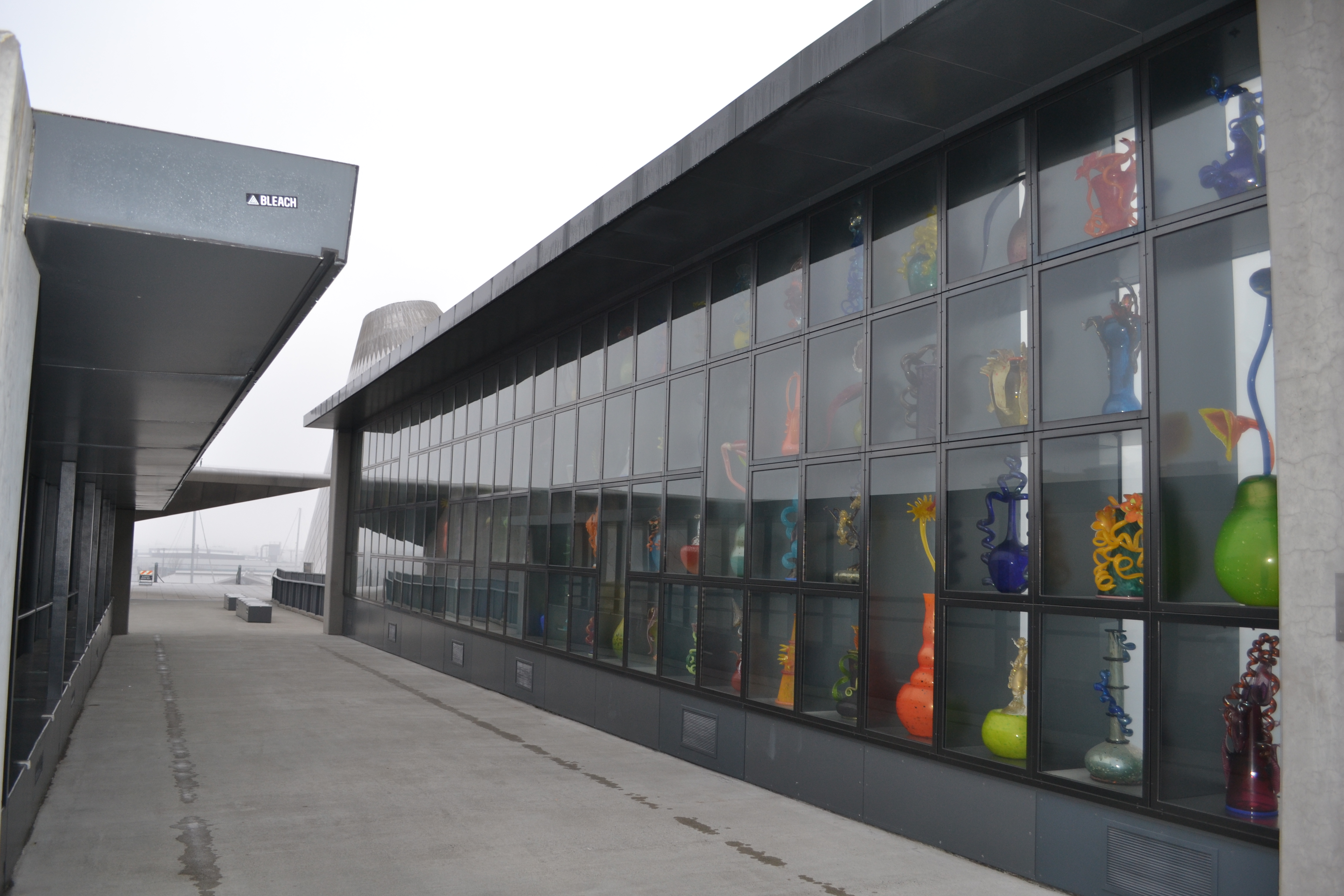
- Coordinates: 47.245585°N 122.435410°W
- Carries: Pedestrian traffic
- Crosses: I-705
- Locale: Tacoma, Washington

Characteristics
- Material: Steel, concrete, glass
- Total length: 500 feet (150 m)
- Height: 70 feet (21 m)

History
- Designer: Dale Chihuly and Arthur Andersson (Andersson·Wise Architects)
- Opened: 2002

Location
- Interactive map of Bridge of Glass

The Bridge of Glass is a 500-foot (150 m) pedestrian partially-covered footbridge spanning Interstate 705 in Tacoma, Washington. It was opened in 2002 as a gift to the city. The Bridge of Glass connects the Museum of Glass on the Thea Foss Waterway to the downtown and attractions along Pacific Avenue such as Union Station, Washington State History Museum, and Tacoma Art Museum. Together, these attractions make up an area of Tacoma described as "Museum Row." The Bridge of Glass was designed by Texas architect Arthur Andersson and is decorated with artworks by Dale Chihuly. Chihuly has described the Bridge of Glass as "the gateway that welcomes people to Tacoma." It is accessible and free to the public 24 hours a day, lighting up during the nighttime.

== Artwork ==
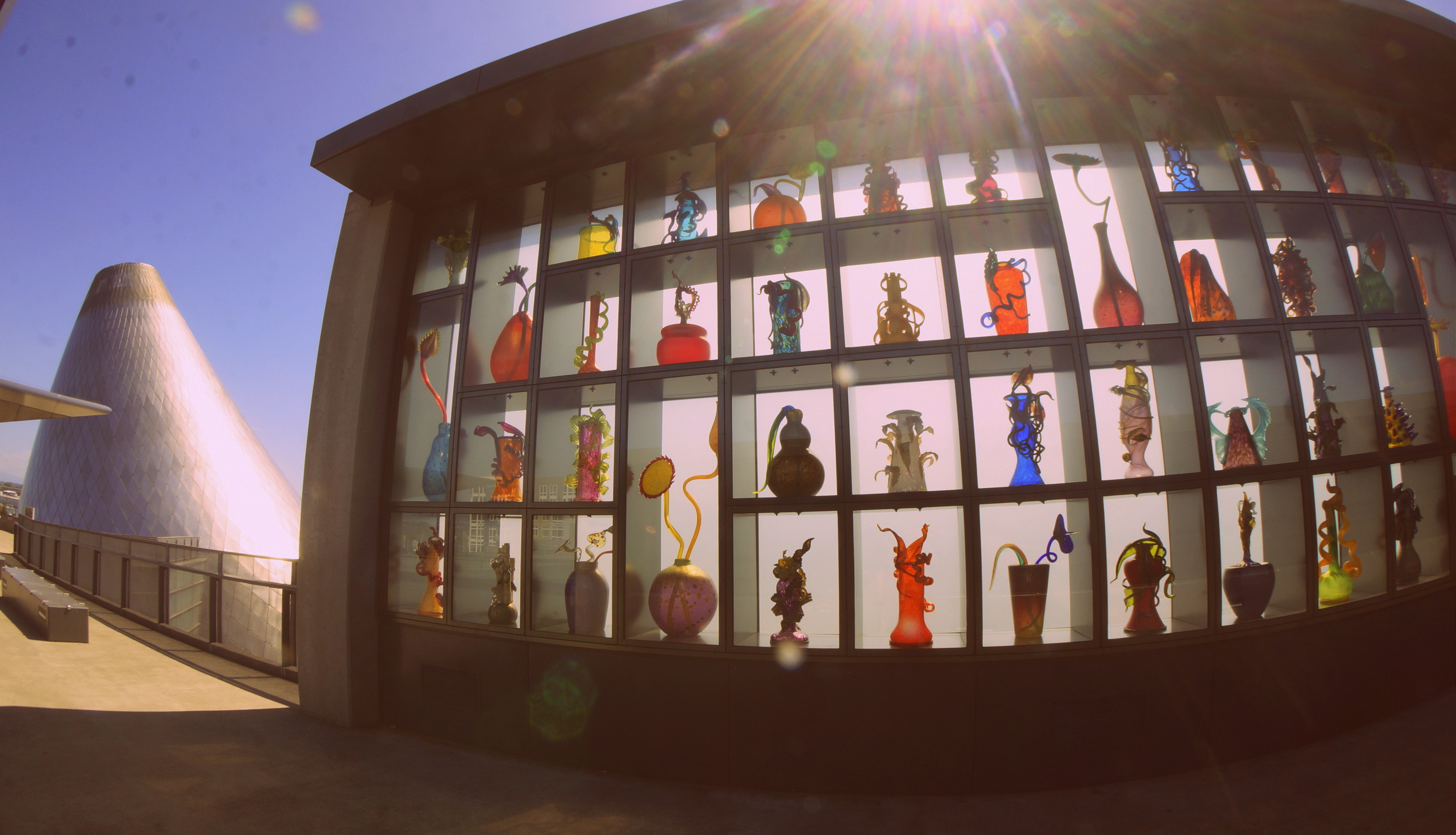
Artwork on the bridge

Crossing the bridge, visitors will observe three Chihuly glass installations. On the south end of the bridge, closest to the downtown is the "Seaform Pavilion", a 15-meter-long covered portion of the bridge suspending 2,364 pieces of colorful marine-life inspired glass on the ceiling overhead. Heading north, past the "Seaform Pavilion" and toward the center of the bridge are the "Crystal Towers", two 40-foot-tall structures on either edge resembling enlarged, vertical pieces of turquoise rock candy. The towers are made from 63 pieces or "crystals" of Polyvitro, a polyurethane material known for its durability. At night, the towers are illuminated and visible at many points around the downtown area. Lastly, and closest to the museum on the north end of the bridge, is the "Venetian Wall", an 80-foot-long installation housing 109 individual showcases of Art-Deco style artworks lit by fiber-optic lights. After the final installation, visitors arrive on the rooftop of the Museum of Glass, where they can follow a series of ramps bordering additional outdoor glass installations to the entrance, or take an elevator to the first-floor parking area.

== History ==
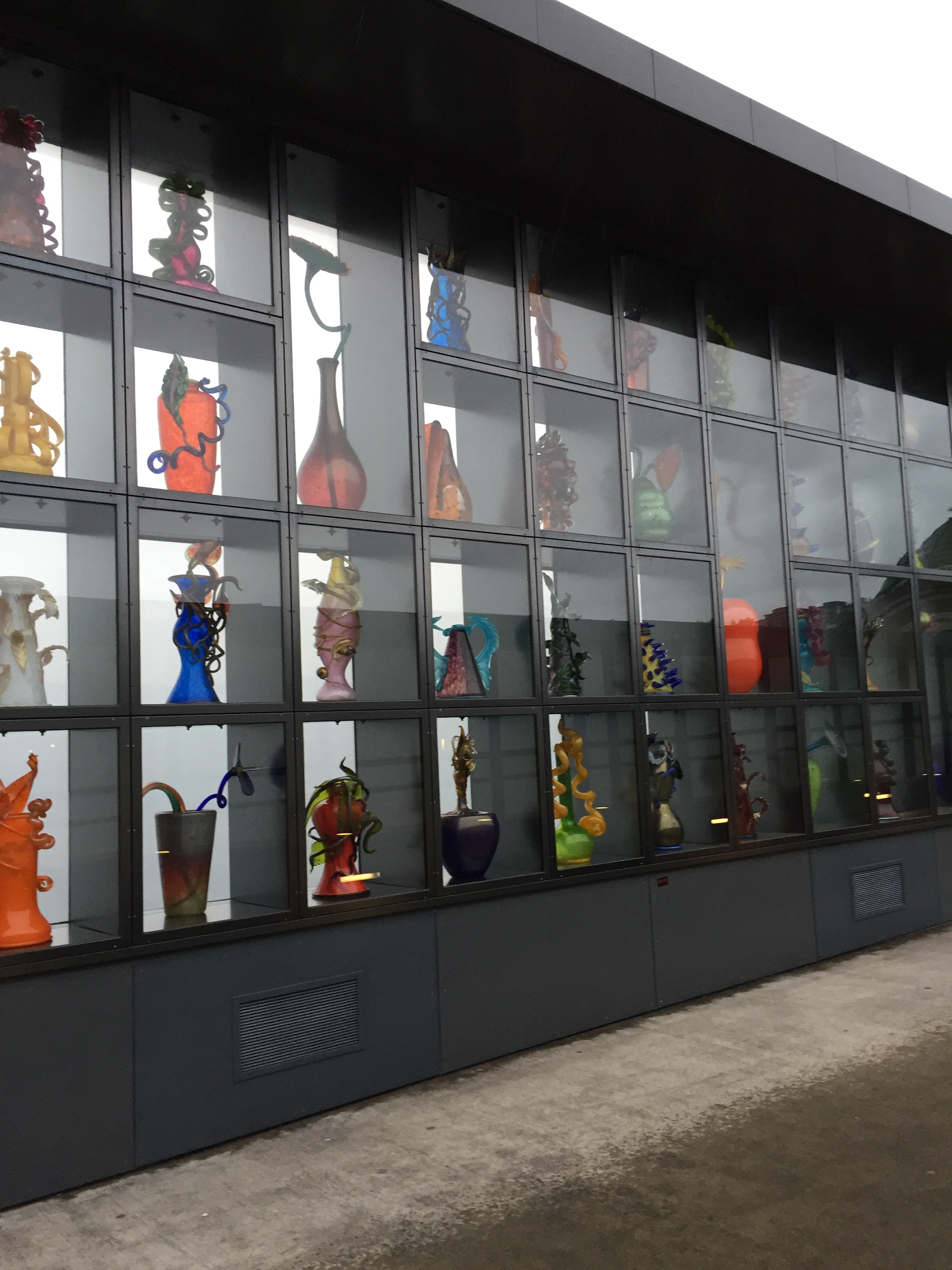
Venetian Wall

The Museum of Glass and Bridge of Glass were created amidst the development of Tacoma's Thea Foss Waterway. In 1991, the city acquired 27 acres on the downtown waterfront for $6.8 million. Considered one of the most polluted Superfund sites in the country, the city, federal agencies, and about 70 companies considered responsible for the pollution, paid roughly $103 million to clean up the area. Tacoma civic and business leaders met with investor George F. Russell Jr. in 1992 to discuss their vision of a museum showcasing the artwork of Tacoma native, Dale Chihuly. By 1995, Russell and his wife were named co-chairmen of the museum's board, and with board-approval selected Arthur Erickson as the museum's architect. Ultimately, the board's vision of a museum featuring artwork exclusively by Chihuly, was redirected by Chihuly himself who suggested the museum should feature the works of glass artists from around the world. It was decided Chihuly would contribute three permanent installations on the proposed bridge to link the museum to the downtown area, later named the Chihuly Bridge of Glass. The Museum of Glass was the first establishment built on the cleaned up Thea Foss Waterway site in 2002. The Museum of Glass cost about $48 million, and the Bridge of Glass about $12 million in building, design, and installation expenses.

== See also ==
- List of public art in Tacoma, Washington
