= Effetre glass =

Type of medium-soft glass

Effetre glass (Italian: [ˌɛffeˈtrɛ], Italian F3, abbreviated form of fratelli tre, "three brothers"), once known as Moretti glass, is a kind of glass used in lampworking. It is considered a medium-soft glass and is popular because of its wide range of colors and the ease with which it is molded and shaped when hot. Genuine Effetre glass is made in Italy by the Effetre Murano S.r.l, on the island of Murano. It has a working temperature of 1,733 °F (945 °C) and a coefficient of expansion value of 104. Effetre is a variety of soda-lime glass.
