= Museum of Glass =

Non-profit organisation in the USA

- Established: 2002
- Location: Tacoma, Washington, U.S.
- Coordinates: 47°14′44″N 122°26′01″W
- Type: Art museum
- Collections: Contemporary glass art
- Director: Debbie Lenk
- Architect: Arthur Erickson
- Public transit access: Union Station/South 19th Street station, T Line (Sound Transit)
- Website: www.museumofglass.org

The Museum of Glass (MOG) is a 75,000-square-foot (7,000 m^{2}) contemporary art museum in Tacoma, Washington, dedicated to the medium of glass. Since its founding in 2002, the Museum of Glass has been committed to creating a space for the celebration of the studio glass movement through nurturing artists, implementing education, and encouraging creativity.

== History ==
The idea for the Museum of Glass began in 1992 when Dr. Philip M. Phibbs, recently retired president of the University of Puget Sound, had a conversation with Tacoma native and renowned glass artist Dale Chihuly. Phibbs reasoned that the Pacific Northwest's contributions to the studio glass movement warranted a glass museum, and he outlined a plan for the Museum of Glass to the Executive Council for a Greater Tacoma. The timing of his proposal corresponded with the idea to redevelop the Thea Foss Waterway, an industrial site. The chairman of the council, George Russel, concluded that the Museum of Glass would be the perfect anchor for the renewed waterway.

The site for the museum, directly adjacent to the Thea Foss Waterway, was secured in 1995. The Museum of Glass was established as a nonprofit organization in 1996. Canadian architect Arthur Erickson was chosen to design the museum's building in 1997. Construction of the museum began in June 2000, and the steel frame of the iconic hot-shop cone was completed in 2001. Shortly thereafter construction began on the Chihuly Bridge of Glass to link the museum to downtown Tacoma. The museum opened on July 6, 2002, to thousands of visitors and worldwide accolades.

Since its opening, the Museum of Glass has become a collecting institution, and has introduced a mobile hot-shop.

In 2024, the Museum of Glass made history with its first permanent installation of a functional glass pipe, "Triceratops" by Ryan (Buck) Harris, known as Buck Glass. The "Triceratops" was donated to the museum by an anonymous private collector. The Museum of Glass took to Instagram breaking the news and stating in a post: " “Triceratops” is an example of this complex, and once taboo, art form. It bridges the gap between functional and fine art and is the first example of functional glass pipes to be accepted into the Museum's Permanent Collection, the tip of an iceberg of innovative and avant garde glassmakers."

== Architecture ==
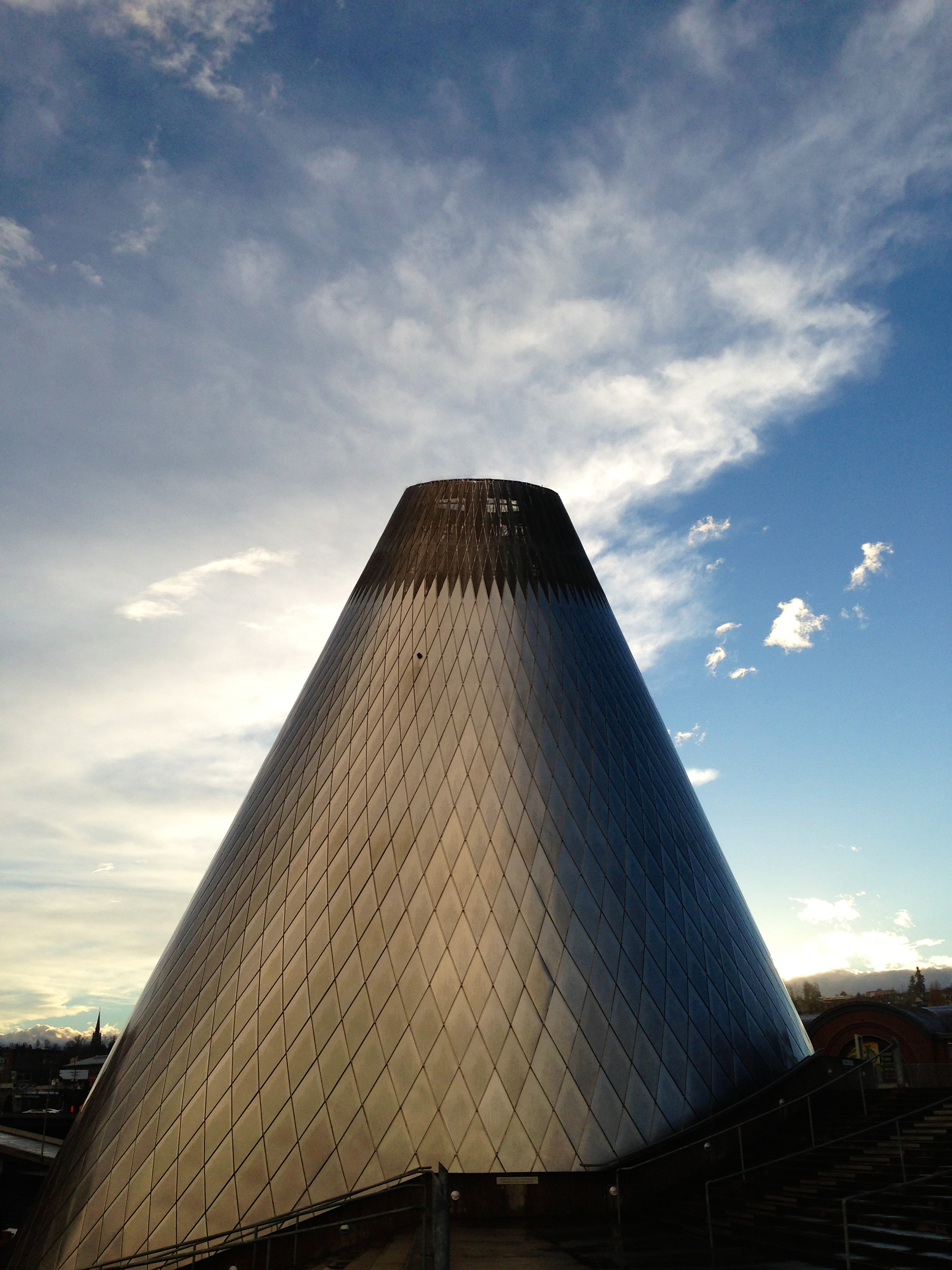
Outside of the Hot Shop - the cone building

The Museum of Glass was designed by Canadian architect Arthur Erickson and was his first major art museum in the United States. The museum totals 75,000 square feet (7,000 m^{2}) in area, featuring 13,000 square feet (1,200 m^{2}) in gallery space and a 7,000-square-foot (650 m^{2}) hot shop. This hot shop, shaped as an angled cone, is the museum's most striking architectural feature. The cone, inspired by the wood "beehive burners" of the sawmills that once dotted the waterway, is composed of 2,800 diamond-shaped stainless steel panels and is 100 feet (30 m) in diameter at its base. Also featured in the Museum of Glass' architecture are a sweeping concrete stairway that spirals around the exterior of the building, and three rimless reflecting pools featured on the museum's terraces. Connected to the museum is the Chihuly Bridge of Glass, designed by Arthur Erickson in collaboration with artist Dale Chihuly, to connect the Museum of Glass to downtown Tacoma.

== Exhibitions ==
=== Permanent collections ===
- 20th and 21st Century Glass Collection
- Kids Design Glass Collection
- Visiting Artist Residency Program Collection
- Cappy Thompson: Gathering the Light

=== Current exhibitions ===
- Kids Design Glass | 2009 – Ongoing
- Illuminate: Glass Art For Early Learners | April 29, 2023 – March 2024
- Out Of The Vault: Family Meal | July 1, 2023 – 2024
- She Bends: Redefining Neon Legacy | February 11, 2023 – October 29, 2023
- Boundless Curiosity: A Journey With Robert Minkoff | April 2, 2022 – September 24, 2023

=== Past exhibitions ===
- Out of the Vault: Soundtracks | June 18, 2022 – June 18, 2023
- Maestro Alfredo Barbini: Nature, Myth, and Magic, the David Huchthausen Collection | July 2, 2022 – April 9, 2023
- What Are You Looking At?: An Eccentric Chorus of Artists Working in Glass | September 26, 2021 — January 22, 2023
- Conservation From Here | April 26–Summer 2022
- René Lalique: Art Deco Gems from the Steven and Roslyn Shulman Collection | November 27, 2020 – June 19, 2022
- Spotlight on Dale Chihuly | October 14, 2017 – June 5, 2022
- Transparency: An LGBTQ+ Glass Art Exhibition | October 12, 2019 – September 5, 2021
- The Art of Being: Feelings, Memories, and Imagination | May 14 – August 29, 2021
- A Glimpse at the Robert M. Minkoff Foundation Collection | October 16, 2020 – May 9, 2021
- Counterparts: Glass + Art Elements | April 2, 2021 – March 13, 2022
- Richard Marquis: Keepers | September 28, 2019 - February 15, 2021
- Alchemy 5: Transformation in Contemporary Enamels | November 23, 2019 – October 18, 2020
- Out of the Vault: Hidden Gems from the Museum of Glass Permanent Collection | March 30, 2019 – October 18, 2020
- Beyond the Hot Shop: Glass in a Digital Age | January 27 – Summer 2020
- Translations: An Exploration of Glass by Northwest Native Carvers and Weavers | March 30 – November 10, 2019
- Preston Singletary: Raven and the Box of Daylight | October 3, 2018 – September 2, 2019
- Foraging The Hive: Sara Young and Tyler Budge | May 26, 2018 – March 17, 2019
- Complementary Contrasts: The Glass and Steel Sculptures of Albert Paley | September 9, 2017 – August 19, 2018
- Michael E. Taylor, Traversing Parallels | October 28, 2017 – May 13, 2018
- Akio Takamori: Portraits And Sleepers | March 7 – May 6, 2018
- Linda MacNeil: Jewels of Glass | January 21 – October 1, 2017
- #BeTheCurator | January 16 – October 23, 2016
- Ispirazione: James Mongrain in the George R. Stroemple Collection | February 10 – October 15, 2017
- Into the Deep |September 24, 2016 – August 20, 2017
- Art Deco Glass from the Huchthausen Collection | October 8, 2016 – August 13, 2017
- David Huchthausen: A Retrospective Selection | July 23, 2016 – January 8, 2017
- Joey Kirkpatrick and Flora C. Mace: Every Soil Bears Not Everything | September 23, 2015 – September 6, 2016
- David Willis: Daisies | May 4, 2016 – August 2016
- Chihuly's Venetians: The George R. Stroemple Collection | July 25, 2015 – January 4, 2016
- Vanity | March 4, 2015 – August 30, 2015
- Treasures from Glass Collectors | July 13, 2015 – September 7, 2015
- Tools of the Trade | July 13, 2015 – September 7, 2015
- Kids Design Glass Too | January 17, 2015 – July 12, 2015
- Chihuly Drawings | March 1, 2015 – June 30, 2015
- Patra Passage | February 14, 2015 – May 10, 2015
- Look! See? The Colors and Letters of Jen Elek and Jeremy Bert | February 7, 2014 – February 1, 2015
- Coastal Alchemy - Anna Skibska and Associates | February 22, 2014 – February 8, 2015
- Lightness of Being - New Sculpture - Howard Ben Tré | September 13, 2014 – January 4, 2015
- Hilltop Artists 20th Anniversary | September 13, 2014 – February 1, 2015
- Celebrating Lino Tagliapietra | September 24, 2014 – January 18, 2015
- Iittala Birds by Toikka | September 24, 2014 – February 22, 2015
- Bohemian Boudoir | January 15 – May 4, 2014
- Links: Australian Glass and the Pacific Northwest | May 17, 2013 – January 26, 2014
- An Experiment in Design Production: The Enduring Birds of Iittala | September 25, 2013 – January 12, 2014
- Northwest Artists Collect | January 19, 2012 – October 27, 2013
- Translucent: Benjamin Moore | February 16, 2012 – October 20, 2013
- Outgrowth: Highlights from the Museum's Collections | February 9, 2013 – April 21, 2013
- Origins: Early Works by Dale Chihuly | May 19 – October 21, 2012
- Beauty Beyond Nature: The Glass Art of Paul Stankard | November 12, 2011 – July 1, 2012
- Gathering: John Miller and Friends | October 29, 2011 – June 19, 2012
- Mildred Howard: Parenthetically Speaking: It's Only a Figure of Speech | July 2, 2011 – April 29, 2012
- Glimmering Gone: Ingalena Klenell and Beth Lipman | Oct. 23, 2010 – March 11, 2012
- Peter Serko: Transformation: Art Changes a City | August 7, 2011 – January 8, 2012
- Kids Design Glass | October 31, 2009 – October 30, 2011
- Fertile Ground: Recent Masterworks from the Visiting Artist Residency Program | October 9, 2010 – October 16, 2011
- Masters of Studio Glass: Richard Craig Meitner | July 17, 2010 – June 19, 2011
- Preston Singletary: Echoes, Fire, and Shadows | July 11, 2009 – September 19, 2010
- Incoming: Selections from the Permanent Collection | May 16, 2009 – July 5, 2010
- Contrasts: A Glass Primer | November 11, 2006 – October 11, 2009
- White Light: Glass Compositions by Daniel Clayman | September 14, 2008 – June 14, 2009
- Dale Chihuly: the Laguna Murano Chandelier | September 14, 2008 – April 19, 2009
- Dante Marioni: Form | Color | Pattern | February 16, 2008 – March 8, 2009
- Lino Tagliapietra in Retrospect: A Modern Renaissance in Italian Glass | February 23 – August 24, 2008

== Hot shop ==
The Museum of Glass features a 7,000-square-foot (650 m^{2}) hot shop amphitheater that provides seating for 145 guests to watch live glass blowing demonstrations. The hot shop contains both a hot glass studio for blowing and casting glass and a cold working studio. Hot shop activity is streamed live through the Museum of Glass’ website and is also archived online. The Museum of Glass hot shop also provides residencies for both visiting and featured artists.

=== Visiting Artist Program ===
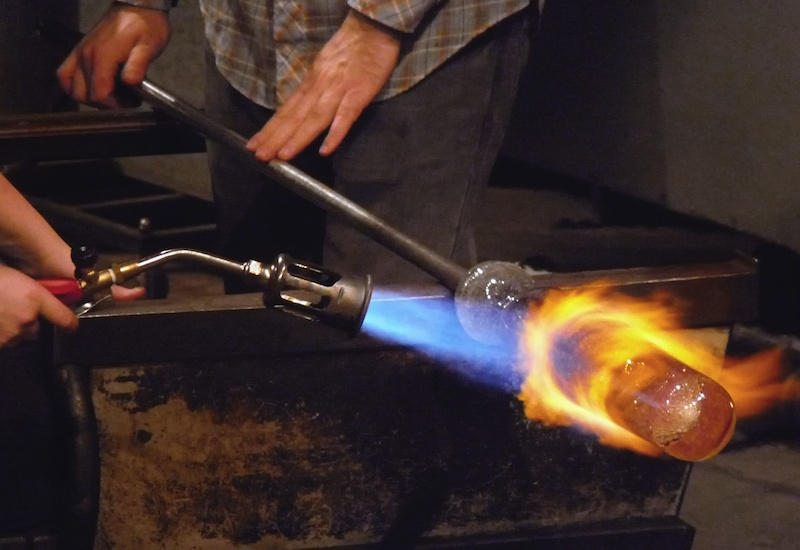
Glassmaking in the hot shop

The Museum of Glass hosts internationally acclaimed and emerging artists through its Visiting Artist Residency Program. The residencies range in length from one day to several weeks, and a piece is selected from each residency for inclusion in the museum's collection. Most residencies are streamed online through the museum's website and conclude in a "Conversation with the Artist" lecture. Since its opening, the Museum of Glass has partnered with Pilchuck Glass School to produce the Visiting Artist Summer Series, in which artists who attend or work at Piilchuck are invited to a residency at the Museum of Glass.

The first ever visiting artist to the Museum of Glass was Dale Chihuly at the museum's opening in 2002.

In 2007 and 2009, Australian glass artist Clare Belfrage was the visiting artist. Some of her work is held by the museum.
