= Indigo Blue Seaform with Red Lip Wraps =

Blown glass artwork

- Artist: Dale Chihuly
- Year: 1997
- Medium: Glass
- Location: Nashville, TN
- Owner: Vanderbilt University Sculpture Collection

Indigo Blue Seaform with Red Lip Wraps is a blown glass sculpture by Dale Chihuly. It was completed in 1997 and is currently located in Central Library at Vanderbilt University in Nashville, Tennessee. The glass features striations, swirls, and a translucency that mimics the natural beauty of underwater environments.

== Background ==
Indigo Blue Seaform with Red Lip Wraps is part of Dale Chihuly's Seaforms series, an evolution of his Baskets series. The Seaforms series includes several blown glass sculptures in various colors. The works feature thin glass wrapped in a spiral fashion which Chihuly describes as "pieces with natural rhythm and fluidity—tributes to the sea." The first work in the Seaforms series, Smoky Quartz Seaform Set with Onyx Lip Wraps, was completed in 1982, and the most recent piece, Indigo Gold Leaf Seaform Set with Midnight Lip Wraps, in 2014. Chihuly is known for his collaborative approach to art-making, often directing a team of skilled glassblowers who help execute his visions. This teamwork allows for the creation of large-scale installations and complex pieces that a single glassblower would find challenging to manage alone. The entire process combines technical skill, artistic vision, and a deep understanding of the material properties of glass.

== Description ==
The Indigo Blue Seaform with Red Lip Wraps set consists of three nested bowls with thin, undulating walls. The sculpture is characterized by its organic, flowing shape that resembles marine life and the movement of water, made from translucent glass with opaque strands wrapped around it. The piece incorporates shades of indigo and cobalt at varying opacities with a contrasting crimson wrap around the outer rim of each bowl. The three individual components are not permanently adhered to one another, instead delicately resting within each other.

== Creation process ==
Chihuly utilized a variety of glassblowing techniques to achieve the intricate forms and vibrant colors characteristic of the sculpture. The creation of this piece primarily involved the traditional art of glassblowing, complemented by Chihuly's innovative approaches. The process starts with gathering molten glass on the end of a long, hollow pipe, known as a blowpipe. The glass is heated in a furnace at temperatures around 870 to 1,040 °C (1,600 to 1,900 °F) to reach a workable, honey-like consistency. Chihuly then added color to the piece through various methods. One technique involved rolling the hot glass in small shards and powders of colored glass, which melt and blend into the base layer when reheated. This was done multiple times with different shades of blue to create varying opacities and depth. For the Seaforms collection, Chihuly's team incorporated the use of optic molds. This technique involves pressing the ball of glass on the end of the blowpipe into a ribbed conic mold made of metal. The use of these molds created a ribbed texture on the sculpture, resembling that of a seashell. This technique allowed the artist to create a thinner final product because the ribs add strength to the glass, giving it better mechanical properties and therefore, making it possible to thin the walls while retaining the ability to bear the weight of the bowls nested on the inside of the sculpture. The artist then blew air into the blowpipe, creating a bubble in the molten glass. As the bubble formed, the glass was shaped using tools and stretching, twisting, and folding the glass to mimic organic, fluid forms reminiscent of aquatic life. Additional layers of glass as well as thin stripes of colored glass were added, and techniques such as pulling or pressing the glass with tools are used to achieve the final shapes of the three glass forms. Chihuly's team often uses wet wooden paddles or metal tongs to create specific shapes and impressions in their pieces.

Unique to this piece is Chihuly's desire for organic shapes as opposed to the uniformity that is often seen in traditional blown glass artwork. For the Seaform collection, Chihuly enjoyed "letting nature take its course" with the glass and allowing gravity to play a role in shaping the glass. Once the three individual pieces were shaped, they were cooled slowly in a kiln in a process called annealing. This controlled cooling process is crucial to prevent the glass from cracking and to ensure the structural integrity of the delicate forms. After annealing, the rough edges on the bottoms of the bowls were sanded to make them smoother as well as add stability to the largest, outermost bowl. Finally, the three individual bowls were nested together to create one coherent sculpture.

== Provenance ==
In 1998, the $40,000 sculpture was donated in memory of Dr. Herman S. Shapiro, a member of the Vanderbilt University School of Medicine class of 1944, by his sons and placed in the Eskind Biomedical Library at Vanderbilt University Medical Center. Displayed along with the piece is a plaque with the text, "Indigo Blue Seaform with Red Lip Wraps, Dale Chihuly, 1997" followed by the dedication, "In loving memory of Herman S. Shapiro, M.D., Vanderbilt medical School 1944, 'a caring and dedicated surgeon' Given by his sons." In conjunction with the donation, Chihuly visited Vanderbilt and several events were held on campus including a public lecture, children's drawing class, and exhibition of Chihuly's glass and drawings.

Since its original placement in the front lobby of Eskind Biomedical Library, the piece was carefully relocated due to a year-long renovation and repurposing of the foyer it occupied. With the assistance of an art relocation specialist, the three nested glass pieces were moved to Vanderbilt University's Special Collections library in 2017, and later to a large community space on the fourth floor where it currently resides. This placement achieved the curatorial team's goal of finding a location for the Chihuly piece with a high level of security and yet still very visible to audiences.

== See also ==
- List of works by Dale Chihuly
- Glassblowing
- Studio glass
- Glass art
