= Fred Tschida =

American artist (born 1949)

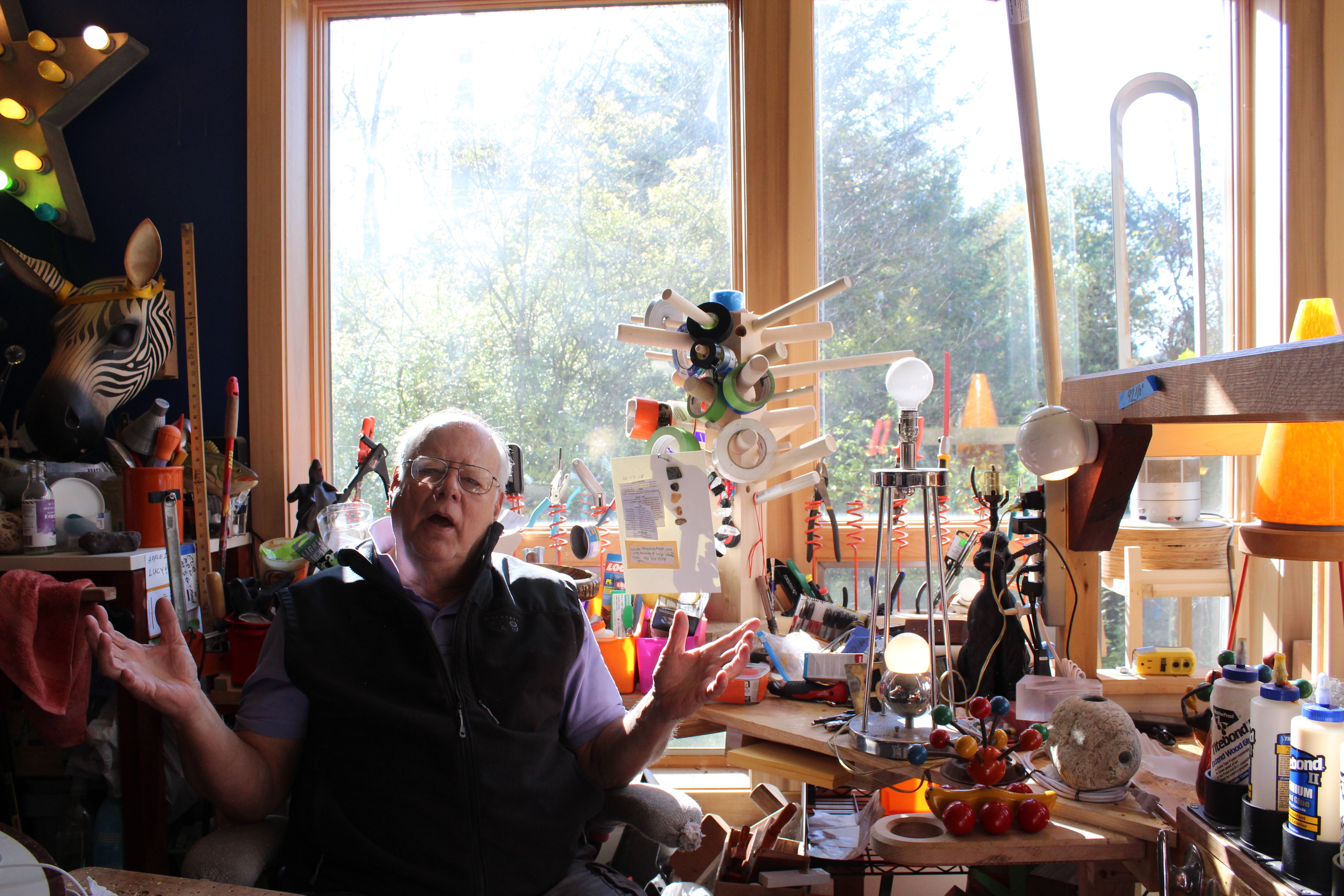
- Tschida in 2018
- Born: 1949 (age 76–77); Saint Paul, Minnesota
- Education: St. Cloud State University; University of Minnesota
- Known for: Neon art and glass art

Fred Tschida (born 1949, Saint Paul, Minnesota) is an American neon artist and professor of glass.

== Early life and education ==
While attending St. Cloud State University, Tschida interned with glass sculptor Dale Chihuly, who taught him how to work with neon. Tschida earned his M.F.A. from the University of Minnesota in 1977 and built the university's first neon studio.

== Career and work ==
Tschida's work focuses on kinetic neon sculpture. In "Light in Motion" (1980), Tschida aimed to travel "the speed of light" by mounting a 22-foot neon mast to the top of a Chevy Impala and driving on the Bonneville Salt Flats in Utah, taking a time-lapse photo of the endeavor. A photo of "Light in Motion" was featured on the cover of Glass: The UrbanGlass Art Quarterly in 1996 for an issue in which his work is profiled by glass art critic and curator William Warmus.

In 1985, Chihuly invited Tschida to teach glass art at Pilchuck Glass School and to establish the school's neon shop alongside Deborah Dohne. In 1991, his installation "Martini Glass" was featured in the American Craft Museum exhibition "Vessels: From Use to Symbol." Curator William Warmus described the intent of the "Martini Glass": "It attracts attention to the exhibition in the same way that signs on neighborhood bars are designed to lure us inside."

In 2006, Corning Museum of Glass curator Tina Oldknow described Tschida as "a mainstay of the influential glass program at Alfred University. She described his work, which involves light, gravity, electricity, mass, and atmosphere as "always inventive and exciting." In July 2007, Tschida was a Visiting Artist at Museum of Glass (Tacoma, Washington) and worked with the museum to make large glass beads for a sculpture.

Tschida taught as Professor of Glass and Design at Alfred University until his retirement in 2015.

== Select exhibitions ==
- 1987 – Neon: New Artistic Expressions at Bruce Museum of Arts and Science, Greenwich, Connecticut
- 1991 – Vessels: From Use to Symbol, American Craft Museum, Manhattan, New York
- 2001 – Luminous Beginnings: Neon Art From the '50s, '60s and '70s., Museum of Neon Art, Glendale, California
- 2021 – CIRCLESPHERE: Alternative explorations in neon. 7A Event Space & The Art House, Wakefield, England

== Awards ==
Tschida received the 2014 Libensky/Brychtova Award from Pilchuck Glass School, which acknowledges extraordinary talent and high achievement in the world of glass and educational leadership. The award jury described Tschida as a "leading pioneer of neon as an expressive medium" who has "inspired new generations of glass artists."
