= V&A Rotunda Chandelier =

Glass sculpture by Dale Chihuly

Coordinates: 51.49642°N 0.17198°W

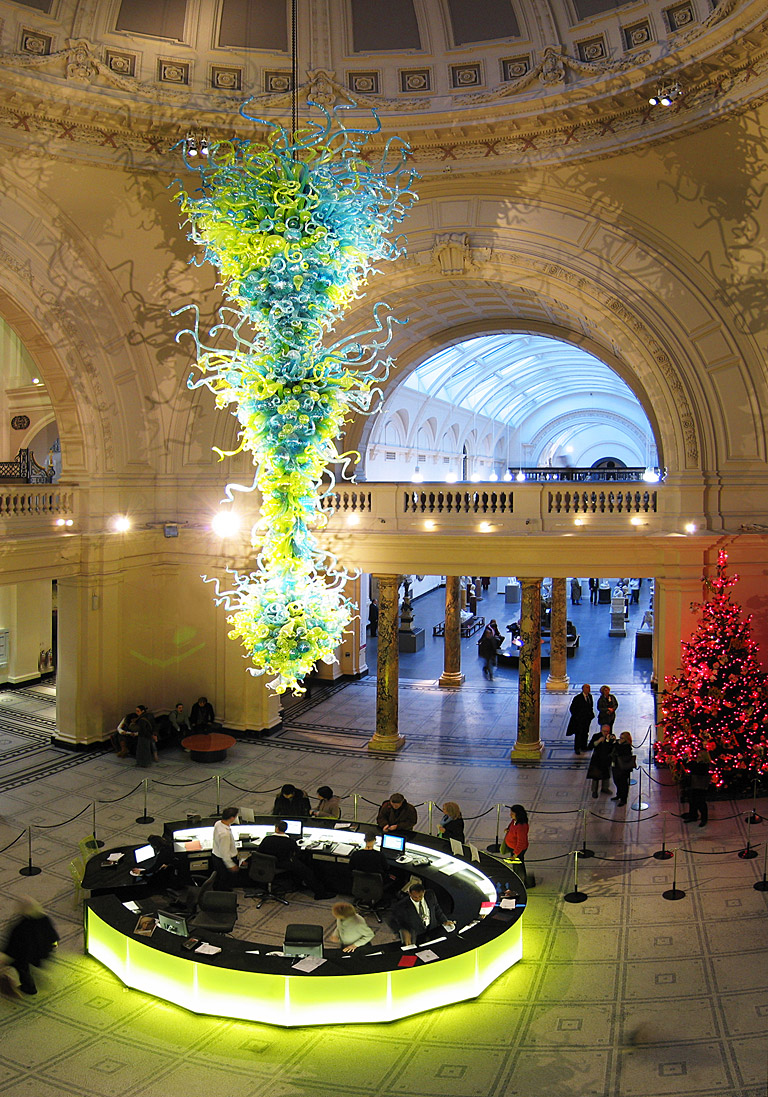
- The V&A Rotunda Chandelier hangs at the entrance to the Victoria and Albert Museum, London
- Artist: Dale Chihuly
- Year: 2001
- Medium: Glass sculpture
- Location: Victoria and Albert Museum, London, United Kingdom

The V&A Rotunda Chandelier (often known as V&A Chandelier and originally called Ice Blue and Spring Green Chandelier) is a glass sculpture by Dale Chihuly. It hangs under the glass rotunda at the entrance to the Victoria and Albert Museum in South Kensington, London. Considered to be an artwork as much as a source of light, it was installed in 1999 and then substantially altered and enlarged to its current size in 2001, coinciding with a V&A exhibition of the artist's work.

== Description ==
The chandelier has dimensions of 27 × 12 × 12 feet (8.2 × 3.7 × 3.7 m) and is made of blown glass. The original name was Ice Blue and Spring Green Chandelier. It was created with blue, green, and yellow glass composed of fused, relatively small swirling tendrils and sharp protruding edges that extend outward from every side. The top and the bottom are composed of a more rounded shape, while a smaller round arrangement of glass hangs in the middle. The top has a notable protrusion, mainly of light blue glass, which then develops into shades of yellow and green as the viewer's eye moves downwards.

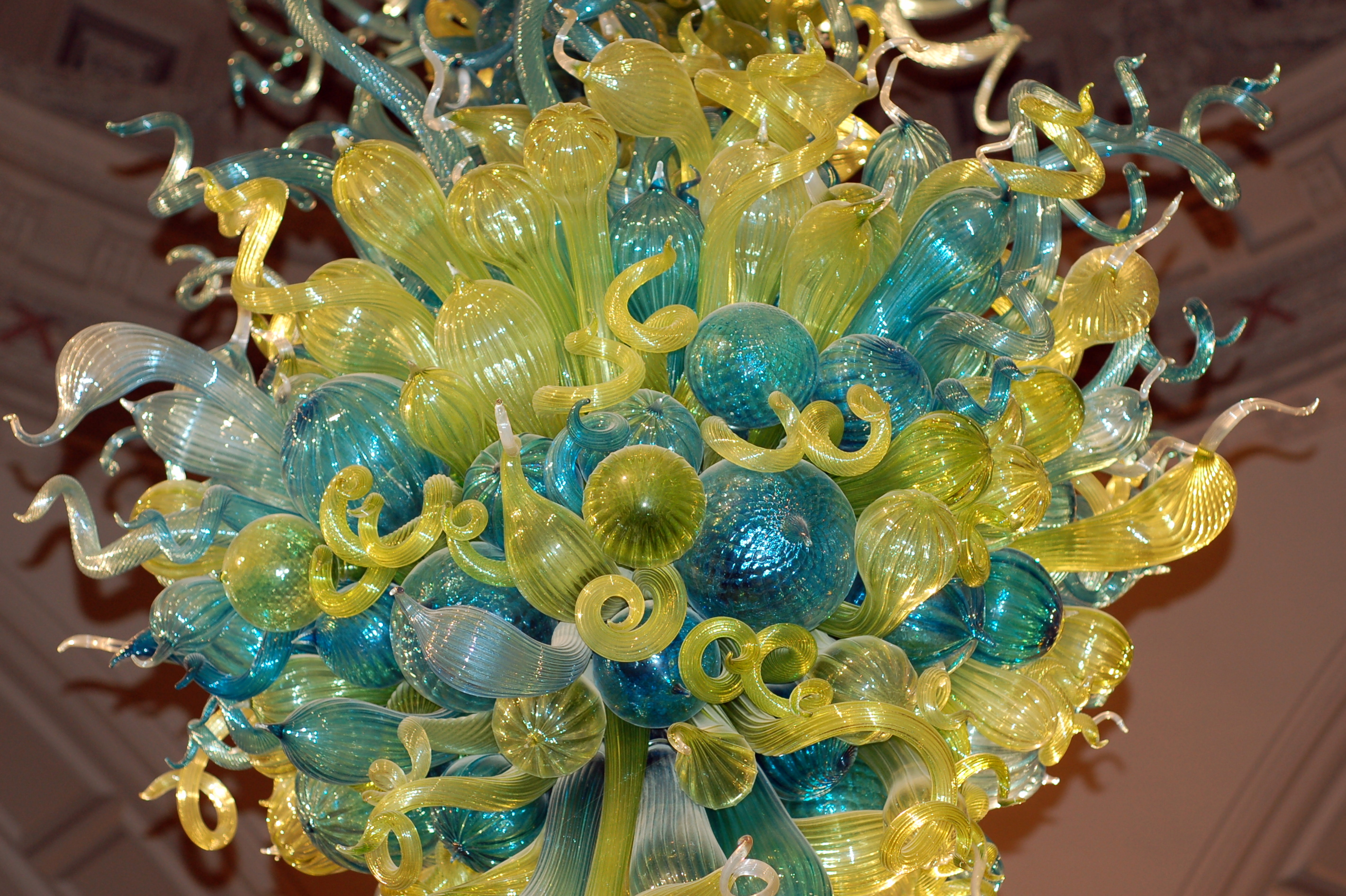
Detail of the chandelier

The first chandelier was installed in 1999 and was more modest, however, Chihuly decided it needed to be bigger and enlarged it so that it now fills the central rotunda at the entrance to the museum. Commenting in The Daily Telegraph, art critic Richard Dorment noted: "The V&A chandelier isn't exactly 'finished' – Chihuly just stopped adding baubles and curlicues and wiggly bits to it. Because its shape is so amorphous, there is no aesthetic reason that I can see why the glass-maker should not continue to ornament the work for the rest of his life, or for as long as the laws of physics allow him to".

While referred to as a chandelier, technically this is a hanging sculpture, a concept Chihuly has favored throughout his career. His technique is to let the glass naturally shape itself. This approach, in combination with his use of vibrant colors, has been described by curator Tina Oldknow as creating: "vessels that communicate a range of aesthetic experience from the ephemeral moods…to the highly emotional, transformational environments realized in large-scale installations".

Like most of Chihuly's works, the chandelier does not light up on its own. In some instances, lights were placed on the piece after the fact or external spotlights were directed towards the structure to illuminate them.

== Care and maintenance ==
The massive size of the chandelier and the delicate nature of the glass meant the museum had had to make special accommodations to house and maintain it. Before the chandelier could even be installed, the V&A had to reinforce the ceiling. Cleaning the chandelier requires specialist techniques. It is cleaned piece by piece by a technician on a raised platform. The technician moves slowly around the chandelier cleaning each individual spike and tendril of glass with an antistatic wand made of plastic filaments. This has to be carried out before the museum opens, a process that takes several days.

== Critics' response ==
The critical response was generally positive, if somewhat uncertain. The London Evening Standard reported: "Whether it attracts you or appals you, Chihuly’s work is certainly breathtaking". Another critic, writing in a home-interest magazine, said: "Wriggling like a large and glowing creature of the sea, this spectacularly weird glass chandelier…[is] the first time Dale’s work has been seen on this scale in the UK and he seems to gather a few more admirers as a result".

== Duplicates ==
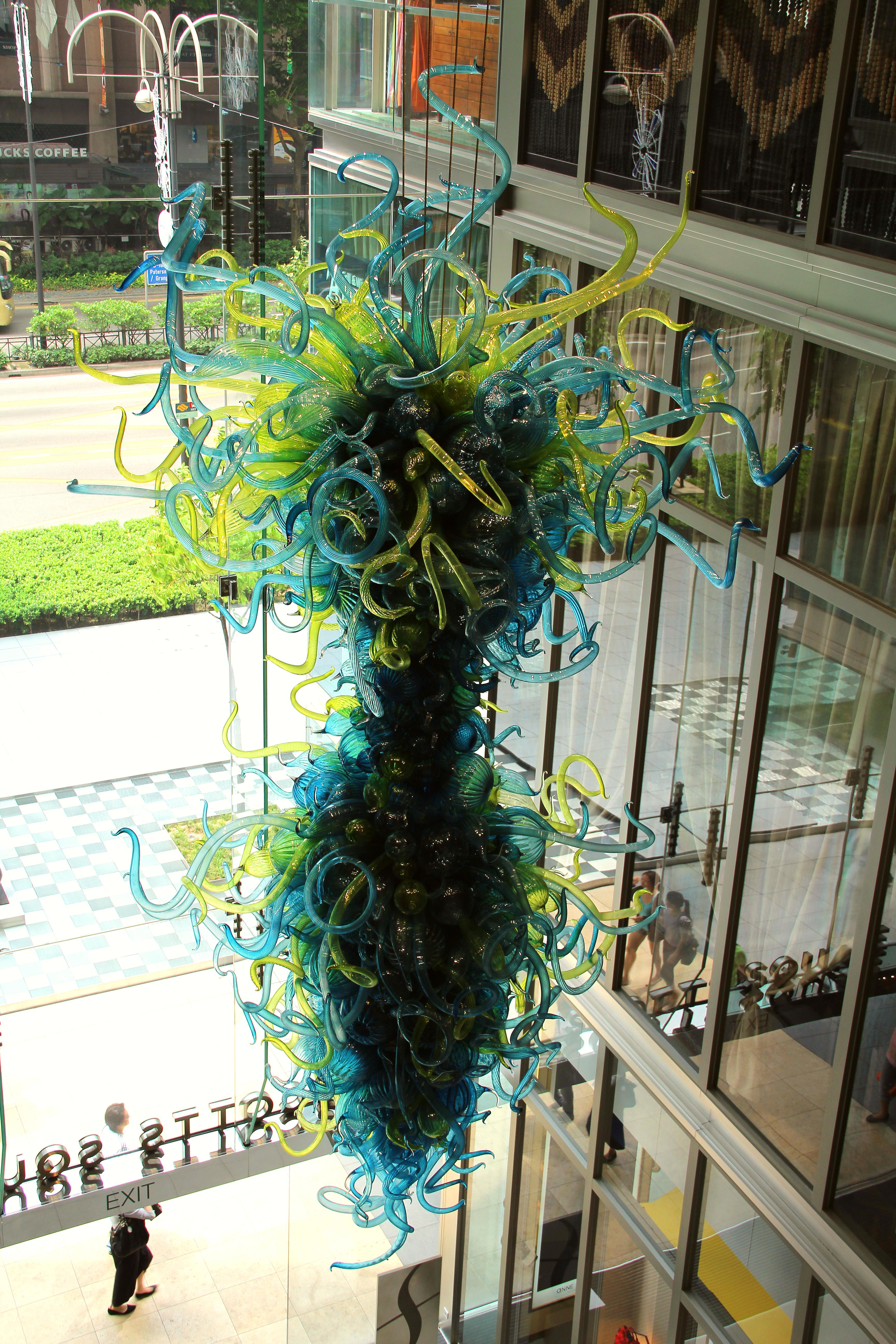
A similar Dale Chihuly chandelier hangs at Scotts Square, Singapore

A duplicate of the 1999 version of the chandelier can be seen at Scotts Square, a shopping centre and residential complex in Singapore. As with the V&A Rotunda Chandelier, its location in the entrance atrium means natural light shines down onto the glass structure creating additional interplay of light.

== See also ==
- List of works by Dale Chihuly
