= Bruce W. Pepich =

American art museum director

- Born: Elmhurst, Illinois, US
- Occupations: Museum director, art curator

Bruce W. Pepich is an American museum director and art curator. He is an expert in American and international craft. He is executive director and curator of collections at the Racine Art Museum and Charles A. Wustum Museum of Fine Arts in Racine, Wisconsin.

== Early life and education ==
Bruce W. Pepich was born in Elmhurst, Illinois and raised in the western Chicago suburbs. He was introduced to the Art Institute of Chicago as a pre-teen and visited frequently.

Pepich received a BA in Art History with a concentration in contemporary art, from Northern Illinois University, DeKalb, Illinois, in 1974.

== Career ==
Pepich joined Racine Art Museum (RAM) as a project director after graduation and was appointed director in 1980. During his tenure, he has built RAM into a major museum focusing on contemporary crafts and fulfilling his, "longstanding ambition to direct the most important craft museum in the Midwest." The museum's most significant donor and promoter, Karen Johnson Boyd, played a significant role, working with Pepich in gaining national recognition for its collection and raising more than ten million dollars for the new building in downtown Racine, creating two campuses for art and education. The National Endowment for the Arts (NEA) also supports Pepich in his philosophy that "serving the community is good for us as an institution."

As of 2014, Pepich had participated on over 135 jury panels for regional, national, and international competitive art exhibitions and fellowship programs. These included the Cotsen Prize for Japanese Bamboo Basketry, the Louis Comfort Tiffany Foundation Artists' Grants, and the Philadelphia Museum of Art Craft Show, described as being "juried by the most distinguished experts in the various fields of craft art".

== Recognition ==
- 2010, Ann Koski Professional Excellence Award-Wisconsin Federation of Museums
- 2010, State of Wisconsin Governor's Award in the Arts from the Wisconsin Foundation for the Arts and Governor Jim Doyle of the State of Wisconsin
- 2011, Wisconsin Visual Art Achievement Award-Museum of Wisconsin Art
- 2012, Honorary Fellow in the American Craft Council's College of Fellows in recognition of his contributions to the field of contemporary American crafts

== Board appointments ==
- 1991–1997 Board of Directors, Taylor Children's Home, Racine, Wisconsin
- 1992: National Endowment for the Arts, Advancement Program Overview Panel
- 1992–1996 Fine Arts Advisory Committee, Carthage College, Kenosha, Wisconsin
- 1993–1996 Professional Advisory Committee, Friends of Fiber International
- 1994–1996 Board of Trustees, Creative Glass Center of America, Millville, New Jersey
- 2007–2010 Board of Directors, Cultural Alliance of Greater Milwaukee, Wisconsin
- 2013 – Present Board of Trustees, American Craft Council

== Publications ==
- Pepich, Bruce W. (2000). Mara Superior: A Retrospective. Connecticut: New Britain Museum of American Art.
- Essay in Takaezu, Toshiko (2000). Toshiko Takaezu: An Essential Balance. Chicago: Perimeter Gallery.
- Essay in The Jewelry of Robert Ebendorf, a Retrospective of Forty Years. Raleigh, North Carolina: Gallery of Art and Design, North Carolina State University. 2003.
- Pepich, Bruce W. (2003). Introducing RAM : the building and collections. Racine Art Museum. ISBN 978-0972832601.
- Ries, Christopher; Pepich, Bruce (2004). Glass and Light: Christopher Ries, Marx Saunders Gallery, Chicago, Illinois, May 22 – June 25, 2004. Chicago: Marx-Saunders Gallery.
- Preface to Hutter, Sidney (2004). Spectral Reflections. Chicago: Marx Saunders Gallery, Ltd.
- Pepich, Bruce W. (13 October 2008). "Collecting collectors/constructing a collection: RAM at five years". issuu.com. SOFA Chicago 2008 Catalog. pp. 38–43.
- Hicks, Bob; Fogarty, Lori; Pepich, Bruce W. (2011). Beth Van Hoesen: Catalogue Raisonné of Limited-Edition Prints, Books, and Portfolios. Hudson Hills Press. ISBN 978-1555953447.
- Pepich, Bruce W.; Vigna, Lena (2017). Collection Focus: Renie Breskin Adams at RAM. Racine Art Museum. ISBN 978-0983183754.
