= Tschida =

Tschida (/ˈtʃiːdə/ CHEE-də) is the surname of the following people:

- Brad Tschida (born c. 1954), American politician
- Fred Tschida (born 1949), American neon artist
- Michael Tschida, American military officer
  - Lake Tschida, created by Heart Butte Dam in southwestern North Dakota, U.S., and named after Michael Tschida
- Tim Tschida (born 1960), Major League Baseball umpire
