= List of works by Dale Chihuly =

List of artworks

This article lists artworks produced by Dale Chihuly (born September 20, 1941), an American glass sculptor and entrepreneur who works with blown glass.

== Permanent collections ==
Permanent collections that include work by Dale Chihuly.

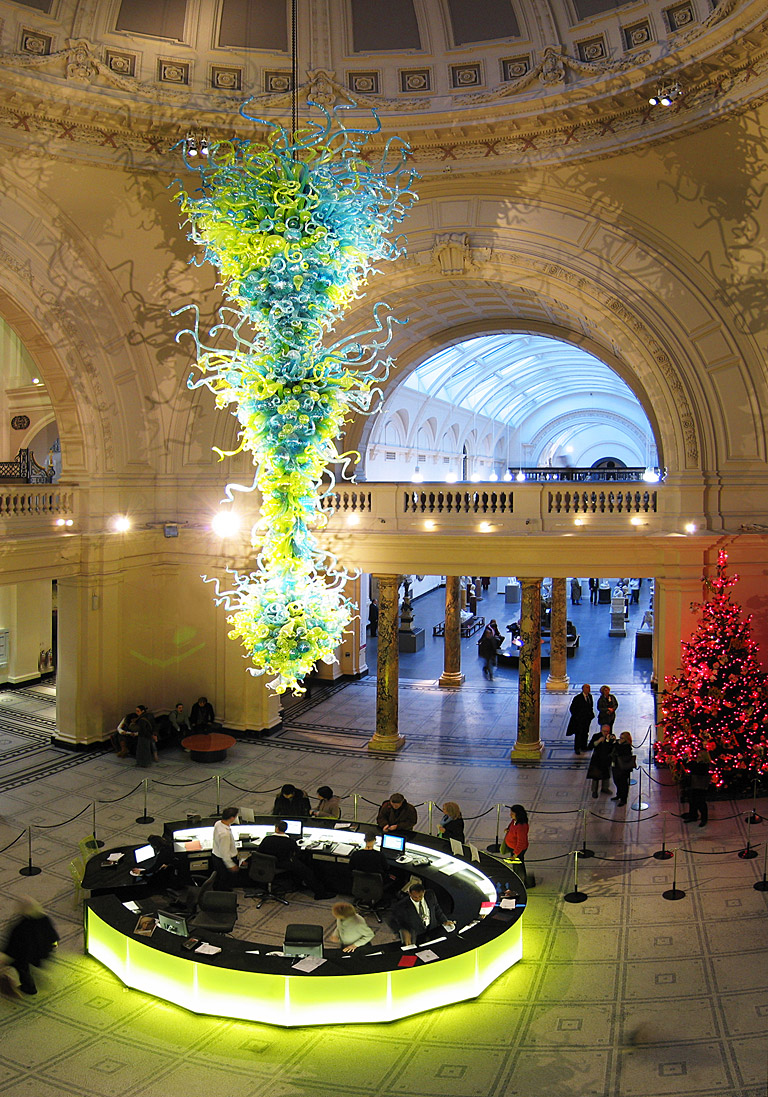
In 2000, Chihuly's commission from the Victoria and Albert Museum for a 30-foot-high (9.1 m), blown-glass chandelier dominates the museum's main entrance.

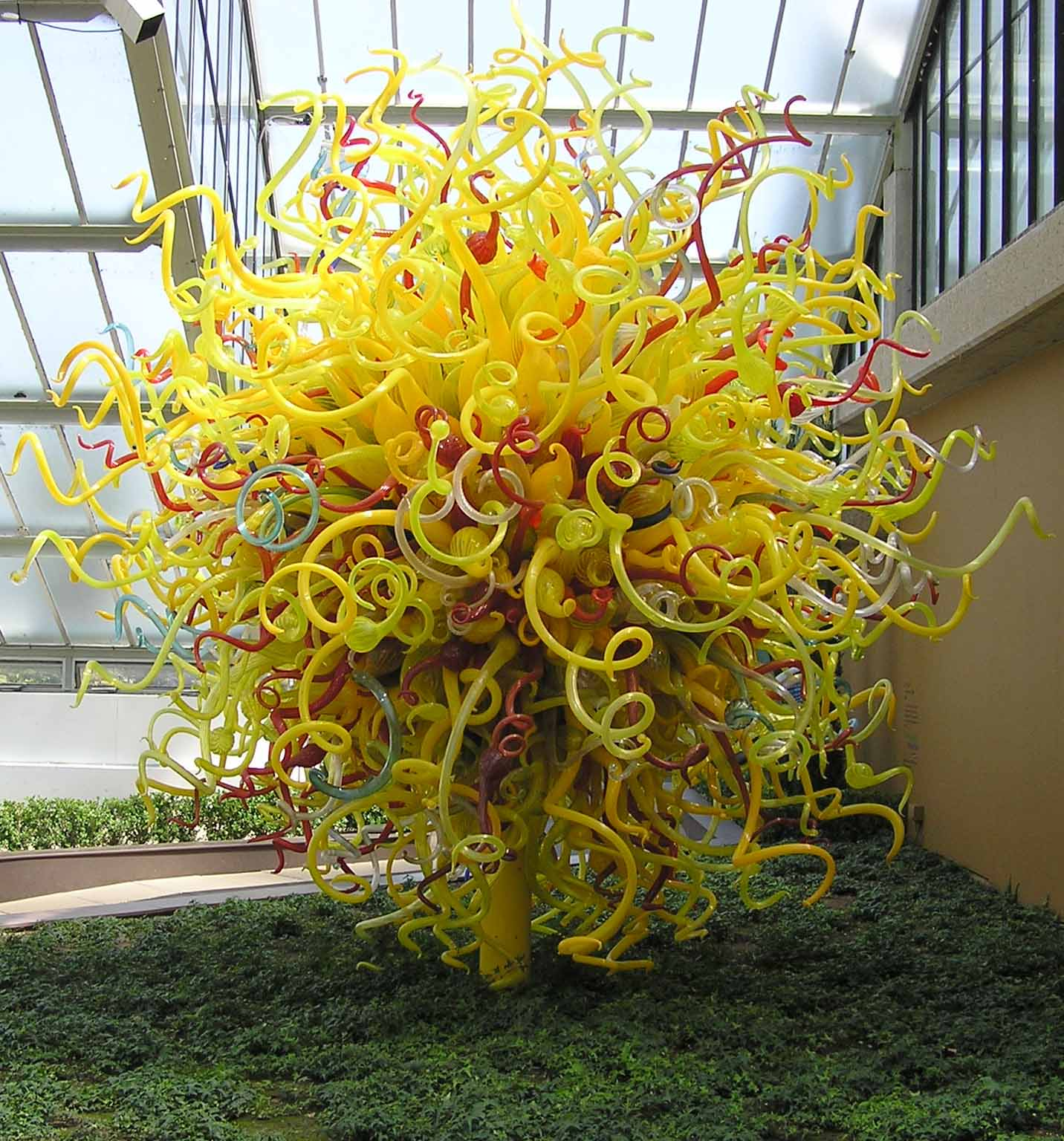
Chihuly's The Sun was on temporary display until January 2006 at Kew Gardens, London, England. The piece is 13 feet (4 m) high.

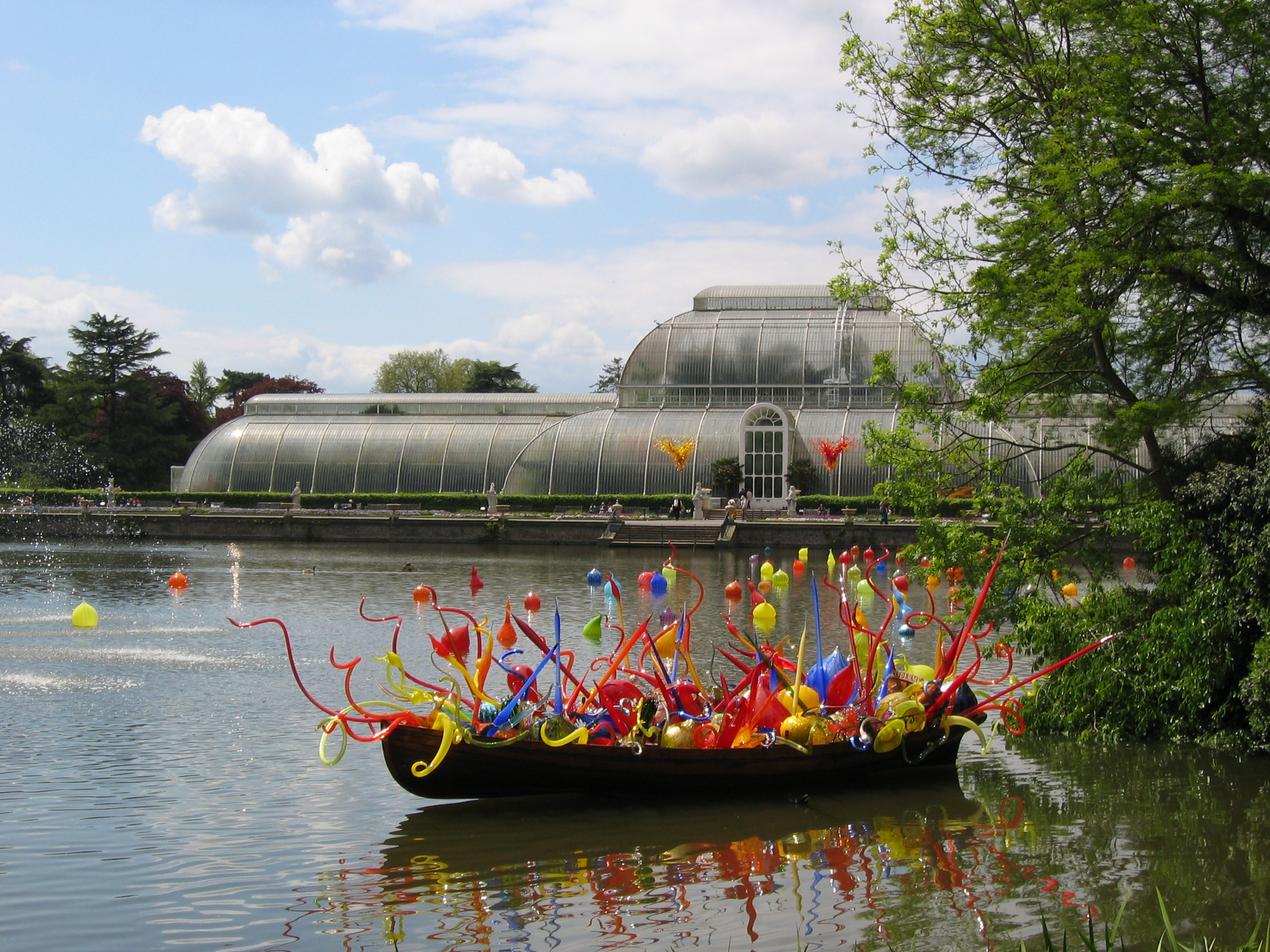
Dale Chihuly glass art at the exhibition of his work in Royal Botanic Gardens, Kew, in 2005.

=== United States ===
- Alabama
  - Amber Luster Chandelier, Jule Collins Smith Museum of Fine Art, Auburn University, Auburn, 2003
  - Birmingham Persian Wall, Birmingham Museum of Art, Birmingham, 1995
- Arizona
  - The Desert Towers, Desert Botanical Garden, Phoenix, 2008
- California
  - Aureolin Yellow Spire Chandelier, Catalina Island Museum, Avalon, 2017
  - Blue Jules, Founders Hall Art Gallery, Soka University of America, Aliso Viejo, 2001
  - Nuutajarvi Turquoise Chandelier, San Jose Chandelier - Cadmium Yellow, San Jose Chandelier - Cadmium Red, San Jose Museum of Art, San Jose, 1995
  - Sea Anemones, Cerritos Library, Cerritos, 1995
  - Sobrato Chandelier, Sobrato Office Tower, 488 S. Almaden Boulevard, San Jose, 2003
- Colorado
  - Colorado Springs Fine Arts Center, Colorado Springs, 2004
  - Colorado, Denver Botanic Gardens, Denver, 2015
- Connecticut
  - Ode to Joy, Bushnell Center for the Performing Arts, Hartford,
  - River Blue, Mohegan Sun Casino, Uncasville,
- Delaware
  - Persian Window, Delaware Art Museum, Wilmington, 1999, expanded in 2005
- Florida
  - Lowe Art Museum at the University of Miami, Coral Gables
  - Chihuly Collection, includes Ruby Red Icicle Chandelier, Morean Arts Center, St. Petersburg
  - Persian Sealife Ceiling, Norton Museum of Art, West Palm Beach, 2003
  - Cobalt and Citron Tower, on a 10-year loan to the museum, Orlando Museum of Art Orlando, 2004
  - Boca Raton Museum of Art, Boca Raton
  - Red Chandelier, Icicle Chandelier, and Persian Ceiling, The Baker Museum (formerly the Naples Museum of Art), Naples
  - Chandelier, Mayo Clinic, Jacksonville
- Georgia
  - Isola di San Giacomo in Palude, Columbus Museum, Columbus, 1996
  - Chandeliers, Scheller College of Business, Atlanta, 2008
- Hawaii
  - Persians Yellow and Cobalt Wall Piece, Honolulu Museum of Art, Honolulu, 1992
  - Reef, Honolulu Museum of Art, Honolulu, 2001
- Illinois
  - Persian Wall, Schaumburg Township District Library Main Branch, Schaumburg
  - Persian Pool, Garfield Park Conservatory, Chicago, 2002
- Indiana
  - Yellow Chandelier and Persians, Columbus Area Visitors Center, Columbus, 1995
  - DNA Tower on the campus of Indiana University – Purdue University Indianapolis, Indianapolis, 2003
  - Fireworks of Glass Tower and Ceiling, The Children's Museum of Indianapolis, Indianapolis, 2006
  - Sun Garden Panels in Suspended Circle, Indiana University-Purdue University Columbus Learning Center, Columbus, 2007
- Kansas
  - "Chandalier" Kansas State University, Beach Museum of Art acquired in 1996
  - Persian Seaform Ceiling, Wichita Art Museum, Wichita, 2003
- Kentucky
  - The Spirit of the Maker, Maker's Mark Distillery, Loretto, 2014
- Massachusetts
  - Lime Green Icicle Tower, Museum of Fine Arts, Boston, 2011
  - Clear and Gold Tower, Mount Holyoke College Art Museum, South Hadley, 2013
- Michigan
  - Cobalt Blue Persian Set with Cadmium Red Lip Wraps, Muskegon Museum of Art, 1992
  - Kalamazoo Ruby Light Chandelier, Kalamazoo Institute of Arts, Kalamazoo, 1998
  - Beacon Gold Chandelier, Krasl Art Center, St. Joseph, 2000
  - Flint Institute of Arts Persian Chandelier, Flint Institute of Arts, Flint, 2009
  - Gilded Champagne Gardens Chandelier, Frederik Meijer Gardens & Sculpture Park, Grand Rapids, 2003
  - Life, Van Andel Institute, Grand Rapids, 2005
  - Lena’s Garden, Frederik Meijer Gardens & Sculpture Park, Grand Rapids, 2009
- Minnesota
  - Cafesjian Chandelier, Cafesjian Art Trust Museum, Shoreview, 1994
  - Pergola Ceiling, Cafesjian Art Trust Museum, Shoreview, 1999
  - Sunburst, Minneapolis Institute of Arts, Minneapolis, 1999
  - Silver Tiger Print Basket Set with Orange Lip Wraps, Minneapolis Institute of Art, Minneapolis, 1995
  - Clear and Silver Chandelier, Kathryn A. Martin Library, University of Minnesota - Duluth, Duluth, 2000
  - Mayo Clinic, Rochester, 2001
- Missouri
  - Kemper Museum of Contemporary Art Persian Wall, Kemper Museum of Contemporary Art, Kansas City, 1996
  - Campiello del Remer, Ireland, Kemper Museum of Contemporary Art, Kansas City, 1996
  - Palazzo di Loredana Balboni, Kemper Museum of Contemporary Art, Kansas City, 1996
  - Wine Chandelier, St. Louis Art Museum, St. Louis, 1996
  - Cathedral Violet Chandelier, Daum Museum of Contemporary Arts, Sedalia, Missouri, 1999
  - Missouri Botanical Garden Blue Chandelier, Missouri Botanical Garden, St. Louis, 2007
- Nebraska
  - Chihuly: Inside & Out Joslyn Art Museum, Omaha, 2000
  - Toreador Red, Peter Kiewit Institute at the University of Nebraska, Omaha, 2000
  - Glowing Gemstone Polyvitro Chandelier, Joslyn Art Museum, Omaha, 2004
  - Chihuly Sanctuary, Fred & Pamela Buffett Cancer Center, University of Nebraska Medical Center, Omaha, 2017
- Nevada
  - Fiori di Como, Bellagio Hotel and Casino, Paradise, 1998
  - Cure 4 The Kids/Roseman University , Summerlin, 2004
  - Chihuly at CityCenter, The Gallery at CityCenter, CityCenter, Paradise, 2009
- New Jersey
  - Borgata Hotel, Casino & Spa, Atlantic City, 2003
- New Mexico
  - UWC-USA, Montezuma
  - The Spencer Collection, The Spencer Theater, Alto
- New York
  - Rainbow Room Frieze, Rockefeller Center, New York City, 1987
  - Persian Window, St. Peter's Church, New York City, 1994
  - Fern Green Tower, Corning Museum of Glass, Corning, 1999
  - Glass Garden and Chandelier, Mandarin Oriental New York, New York City, 2003
  - Blue and Gold Chandelier, Eastman School of Music, Rochester, 2010
- Ohio
  - Chihuly Collection Franklin Park Conservatory, Columbus, 2003
  - Gilded Silver and Aquamarine Chandelier, Storer Music Hall, Kenyon College, Gambier, 2003
  - The University of Akron, Akron, 2005
  - Campiello del Remer #2, Toledo Museum of Art, Toledo, 2006
  - University Hospitals Ahuja Medical Center, Beachwood, 2010
- Oklahoma
  - Oklahoma City Museum of Art, Oklahoma City, 2002
- Oregon
  - Gilded & Ethereal Blue Chandelier, Global Aviation, Hillsboro Airport, Hillsboro, 2000
- Pennsylvania
  - Phipps Conservatory & Botanical Gardens, Pittsburgh, 2008
  - Flame of Liberty, National Liberty Museum, Philadelphia, 2000
  - Dappled Chalk Violet Ikebana with Fuchsia Frog Foot, Reading Public Museum, Reading, 2002
  - Fountain Spray, Reading Public Museum, Reading, 2005
- South Carolina
  - Untitled, Columbia Museum of Art, Columbia, 2009-2010
  - Burnished Bronze and Garnet Chandelier, University of South Carolina School of Law, Columbia, 2017
- Tennessee
  - Indigo Seaform Set with Red Lip Wraps, Eskind Biomedical Library, Vanderbilt University, Nashville, 1998
- Texas
  - Hart Window, Dallas Museum of Art, Dallas, 1995
  - Southwestern Seay Tower, UT Southwestern Medical Sarah and Charles Seay Biomedical Building, Dallas, 2000
  - Persian Ceiling, San Antonio Museum of Art, San Antonio, 2003
  - Fiesta Tower, San Antonio Public Library, San Antonio, 2005
- Utah
  - Olympic Tower, Abravanel Hall, Salt Lake City, 2002
- Virginia
  - Mille Colori, Virginia Museum of Contemporary Art, Virginia Beach, 2003
- Washington
  - Frank Russell Company, Tacoma, 1988
  - Flower Form 2, Cedar Hall, U.S. Bank Center, Seattle, 1989
  - Washington State Convention Center, Seattle, 1992-1993
  - Union Station (Tacoma, Washington), Union Station (Tacoma, Washington), Tacoma
  - Gonzaga Red Chandelier, Jundt Art Museum at Gonzaga University, Spokane, 1995
  - Rose Window, Pacific Lutheran University, Tacoma, 1995
  - Microsoft Corporation, Redmond, 1995
  - Icicle Creek Chandelier, Icicle Creek Sleeping Lady Conference Retreat, Leavenworth, 1996
  - Crystal Cascade, Benaroya Hall, Seattle, 1998
  - Chihuly Window, University of Puget Sound, Tacoma, 2000
  - Bridge of Glass, Bridge of Glass, Museum of Glass, Tacoma, 2002
  - Chihuly: Gifts from the Artist, Tacoma Art Museum, Tacoma, 2003
  - End of Day Chandelier, Lincoln Square, Bellevue, 2006
  - Chihuly Garden and Glass, Seattle, 2012
- West Virginia
  - The Huntington Museum of Art Tower, The C. Fred Edwards Tropical Plant Conservatory Huntington Museum of Art, Huntington
- Wisconsin
  - Mendota Wall, Kohl Center, University of Wisconsin–Madison, 1998
  - Johnson Family Chandelier, Johnson Building Racine, 2002
  - Weidner Center Chandelier, Weidner Center, University of Wisconsin–Green Bay, 2004

=== Canada ===
- Ontario
  - Soho Metropolitan - 318 Wellington St Toronto, 2003
- Alberta
  - Winter Garden - Jamieson Place, Calgary, 2009
- British Columbia
  - 1200 Georgia Street, Vancouver, 1998
- Quebec
  - Hilton Lac-Leamy, Gatineau, 2001
  - The Montreal Museum of Fine Arts, Montreal, announced a fundraising campaign to purchase The Sun in 2013.

=== United Kingdom ===
- V&A Rotunda Chandelier, Victoria and Albert Museum, London, 1999, expanded in 2001
- Blue to Clear Spire Chandelier, Leathersellers' Hall, London

=== Singapore ===
- Resorts World Sentosa, Sentosa, Singapore, 2010
- Duplicate of the V&A Rotunda Chandelier, Scotts Square, Singapore.
- Chihuly Lounge, The Ritz-Carlton Millenia Singapore

=== United Arab Emirates ===
- Atlantis, The Palm, Dubai, United Arab Emirates, 2008

=== Kuwait ===
- 360 Mall, Kuwait
