= Christina Bothwell =

American glassblower

Christina Bothwell (born December 1, 1960, New York City) is an American contemporary fine arts glass maker. She is known for glass, ceramic, and mixed media sculptures that portray the processes of birth, death, and renewal. Many of her pieces involve human-animal hybrids. Reviewing her 1997 solo exhibition Living with Ghosts at the Radix Gallery, New York, critic Mark Zimmerman said of her "Bothwell’s work turns symbols into spirits of creation."

Her work is held in permanent public collections such as the Corning Museum of Glass, Corning NY; Racine Art Museum, Racine, WI; Shanghai Museum of Glass Art, Shanghai, China; Mobile Museum of Art, Mobile, AL; Palm Springs Museum, Palm Springs, CA and the Alexander Tutsek - Stiftung foundation, Munich, Germany.

== Biography ==
External audio
- “Oral history interview with Christina Bothwell, 2010 June 17-18”, Archives of American Art, Smithsonian Institution

Christina Bothwell was born in New York City, and grew up primarily in town and cities in New York and Pennsylvania. Her parents were not conventional. Her father James was a psychologist, while her mother Rosemary was a realist painter. Bothwell drew her mother's nude models from a young age, and created a dollhouse out of clay for herself.

Beginning in childhood, Bothwell has had “experiences beyond the five senses,” such as premonitions and lucid dreams, that have convinced her of a spiritual dimension that transcends the material world. That awareness has heavily influenced her later work.

Bothwell studied painting at the Pennsylvania Academy of the Fine Arts from 1979 to 1983, working with Will Barnet. She later moved to Manhattan, where she met her husband, writer and illustrator Robert Bender. She spent ten years in New York City, trying to further her artistic career, but increasingly felt pressured and inauthentic.

A major turning point for her occurred when she and her husband moved to rural Pennsylvania. Bothwell states that “Moving out to the country was the point where I started following my heart.” She now sees nature as the main source for her artistic ideas and influences. “There have been times, usually when I’m in nature, when I’ve felt completely in alignment with the best of who I am." She has tried to bring that sense of attunement to her pieces.

Increasingly drawing on animals and the natural world around her, she created figures in mixed media using clay, found objects, and old cloth. Although some of her pieces were described as "exceptionally crafted, exquisitely detailed figurative offerings", her work in the late 1990s was also characterized as nightmarish, or as having a disturbing quality.

Bothwell achieved a second breakthrough in 1999, when she attended a workshop on glassmaking at the Corning Museum. She saw the potential for combining glass with the materials she was already using, to bring lightness and delicacy to her work. In her work she challenges herself to portray the soul, inner awareness, and the connections between life and nature. Combining pit-fired clay with translucent layers of fired glass helps her to create a sense of mystery and things seen and unseen. Although still seen at times as "unsettling", these later works are also described as "beautiful", "ethereal" and "serene".

In a 2017 review, curator and art critic William Warmus describes Bothwell's work as both metaphorical and narrative. He emphasizes the skill required to master and combine three media: painting, ceramics, and glass. He sees the transitions that occur when she combines those media in her works as a way of encompassing time: "When her figures fuse together or break apart, it is generally a sign that time is flowing, on the move, toward the future from the past." Warmus describes Bothwell's pieces as "tender" and "gentle", suggesting that "Perhaps they are uncomfortable in the present, preferring the transitional territory defined by the processes of birth and death?"

== Awards ==
Bothwell has won numerous scholarships and grants including a Pollock-Krasner Foundation Grant and a Virginia A. Groot Foundation award for excellence in sculpture.

== Setbacks ==
On August 8, 2018 a massive fire destroyed Bothwell's art studio, a converted barn in Pennsylvania. Four days later a flood raged through the area, causing further destruction. A significant number of her works along with equipment, materials and personal objects, were destroyed in addition to the studio itself. Losses also included several thousand copies of Robert Bender's children's books, stored in the barn. Since the structure was insured only as a residence, and not as a commercial property, Christina and her husband did not receive compensation for the value of the studio and its contents.

Bothwell has encouraged other artists to learn from her experience, and urges people not to cut corners by declaring their studios or home offices as residential, since they will not be adequately covered in the event of a disaster. She has chosen to view the disaster as a new start, and an opportunity to revitalize and expand her work.
