= Lime Green Icicle Tower =

Glass and steel sculpture by Dale Chihuly

- Artist: Dale Chihuly
- Year: 2011
- Type: glass, steel
- Dimensions: 13.0 m × 2.1 m (42.5 ft × 7 ft)
- Location: Boston, Massachusetts, United States; 42.339167°N 71.094167°W
- Owner: Museum of Fine Arts

Lime Green Icicle Tower is a 2011 glass and steel sculpture by American artist Dale Chihuly. Housed in the Museum of Fine Arts (MFA) in Boston, Massachusetts, it has been on display in the Ruth and Carl J. Shapiro Family Courtyard since the 2011 exhibit "Chihuly: Through the Looking Glass". The sculpture proved so popular during the exhibit that the museum launched a fundraising campaign to purchase the piece.

== Artist ==
Chihuly, a Seattle-based artist, has been described as the greatest glass artist since Louis Comfort Tiffany. Due to a car accident that left him blind in one eye, Chihuly is unable to blow the glass himself. Instead he uses a team of glassblowers from around the world to create his artwork using traditional glassblowing methods. After molten glass is shaped using a blowpipe, Chihuly adds color to the glass while it's still hot. The glass is then reheated, reshaped, and cooled.

== Design ==
Working with his team of glassblowers, Chihuly designed Lime Green Icicle Tower specifically for the Shapiro courtyard. The artwork, which measures 42.5 feet (13.0 m) high and 7 feet (2.1 m) wide, features 2,342 pieces of blown glass and weighs approximately 10,000 pounds (4,500 kg). Andrea Shea of WBUR-FM described the color of the sculpture as Kermit the Frog. Journalist John O'Rourke of Boston University described Lime Green Icicle Tower as an "exotic, neon-hued palm tree that has taken root in a giant greenhouse" while Judith H. Dobrzynski of The Wall Street Journal described it as a "cross between a cactus and a poplar tree." Although Sebastian Smee, Pulitzer Prize-winning art critic for The Boston Globe, is not a fan of Chihuly's work in general, he praised the sculpture. Smee stated: "I defy anyone not to like it" and the sculpture is "so good it's hard to imagine that Malcolm Rogers, the MFA's director, will not find a way to keep it there long term."

== Exhibit and acquisition ==
Between April and August 2011, "Chihuly: Through the Looking Glass", a collection of Chihuly's work spanning 40 years, was exhibited at the MFA. Approximately 350,000 people viewed the exhibit, the fifth largest attendance ever for an MFA exhibit. Lime Green Icicle Tower was so popular during the exhibit that attendees inquired if the museum would purchase the sculpture. Senior curator of the exhibit, Gerald Ward, said: "Pretty much from day one, people almost invariably ask, 'Does this stay, is it permanent, can we keep it here?' It's met with universal acceptance and people are anxious to have it stay." Museum officials told the public they would need to contribute funds in order for the artwork to stay. Director Malcolm Rogers said funds budgeted for museum acquisitions would not be used to purchase the sculpture, stating: "We're offering people an opportunity to play an active role in our future, sending the message that people can make a difference." On July 18, museum staff placed a contribution box by the sculpture and contacted museum members asking for donations. The following week, the museum set up its first mobile contribution program, allowing the public to give $10 by texting "TOWER". The museum also set up its first website where people could contribute funds online.

The fundraising drive was only the third time the MFA had made such a public appeal to purchase artwork. The previous times were in 1940, to purchase Paul Revere's silver liberty bowl, and 1979–1980, to purchase Gilbert Stuart's portraits of George and Martha Washington. Both of those fundraising drives were successful. In October 2011, museum officials announced they had raised the more than $1 million needed to purchase the sculpture. According to museum officials, "thousands of gifts, small and large, were given by first-time visitors and long-time friends, ranging from piggy-bank savings brought in by children to checks written by adults." An estimated 1,000 people put money into the contribution box or mailed cash to the museum. Additional funds were raised by major museum patrons and foundations, the largest being from a foundation belonging to businessman Donald Saunders and his ex-wife, actress Liv Ullmann.

== See also ==
- List of works by Dale Chihuly
