= Chihuly Garden and Glass =

Glass exhibition in Seattle, Washington

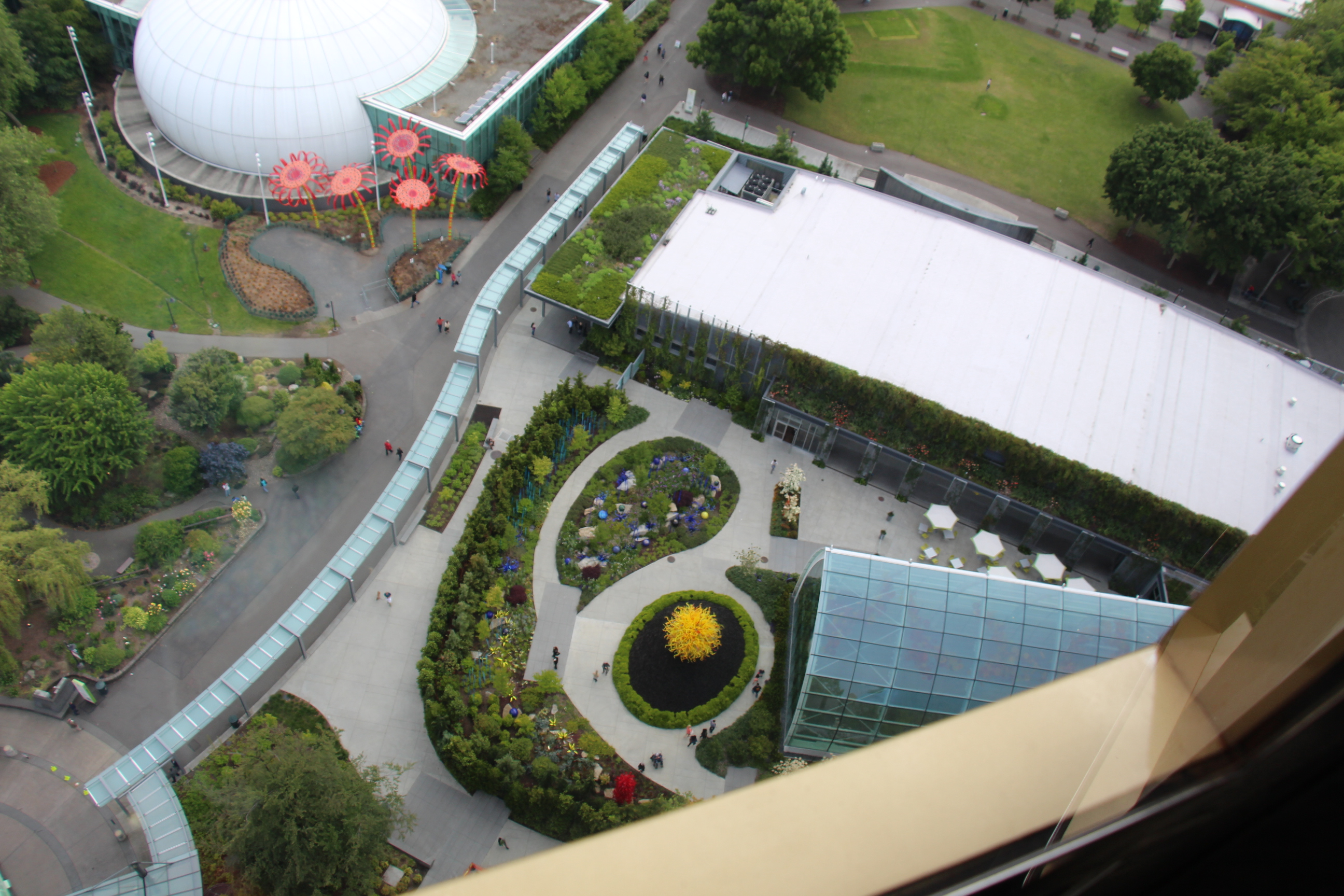
- The exhibition as seen from the Space Needle
- Established: May 21, 2012
- Location: 305 Harrison Street; Seattle, Washington, U.S.
- Coordinates: 47°37′14″N 122°21′00″W
- Type: Studio glass
- Director: Michelle Bufano
- Public transit access: Seattle Center Monorail
- Website: www.chihulygardenandglass.com

Chihuly Garden and Glass is an exhibit in the Seattle Center directly next to the Space Needle, showcasing the studio glass of Dale Chihuly. It opened on May 21, 2012 at the former site of the defunct Fun Forest amusement park.

The project features three primary components: the Garden, the Glasshouse, and the Interior Exhibits, with significant secondary spaces including a bar featuring both all-ages seating and a separate area for guests age 21+, a 50-seat multi-use theater and lecture space, retail and lobby spaces, and extensive public site enhancements beyond the Garden. The 100-foot-long installation inside of the Glasshouse is one of Chihuly's largest suspended sculptures. Designed with the help of architect Owen Richards, the facility was awarded LEED silver certification from the USGBC.

Starting in 2019, the Chihuly Garden and Glass has run a free art and glass festival named Refract: The Seattle Glass Experience. The festival brings together artists, collectors, and showcases of glass art from the Puget Sound area.

The museum regularly partners with Seattle Public Schools (SPS) to invite elementary school students to visit the museum's galleries and take part in hands-on classes. The partnership between Chihuly Garden and Glass and SPS dates back to 2013, with the museum providing over 17,300 free tickets to SPS students as of 2024.

In March 2026, a man destroyed glass art at the museum characterized as "catastrophic" and worth over US$240,000.

== See also ==
- List of single-artist museums
- List of works by Dale Chihuly
