= Christopher Ries =

American glass artist and sculptor (born 1952)

- Born: 1952 (age 73–74); Columbus, Ohio
- Education: Ohio State University, BFA University of Wisconsin, Madison, MFA Misericordia University, Doctor of Humane Letters
- Known for: Glass art
- Website: http://www.christopherries.com/

Christopher Ries (born 1952) is an American glass artist and sculptor. Ries is noted for applying classical sculptural reduction to cold optical crystal rather than using traditional hot techniques such as blowing or molding. He refined his skills during the height of American studio glass movement under the mentorship of its principal founder, Harvey Littleton.

Ries's work includes the largest non-assembled glass forms in existence, and is collected in museums worldwide.

== Biography ==
=== Early life ===
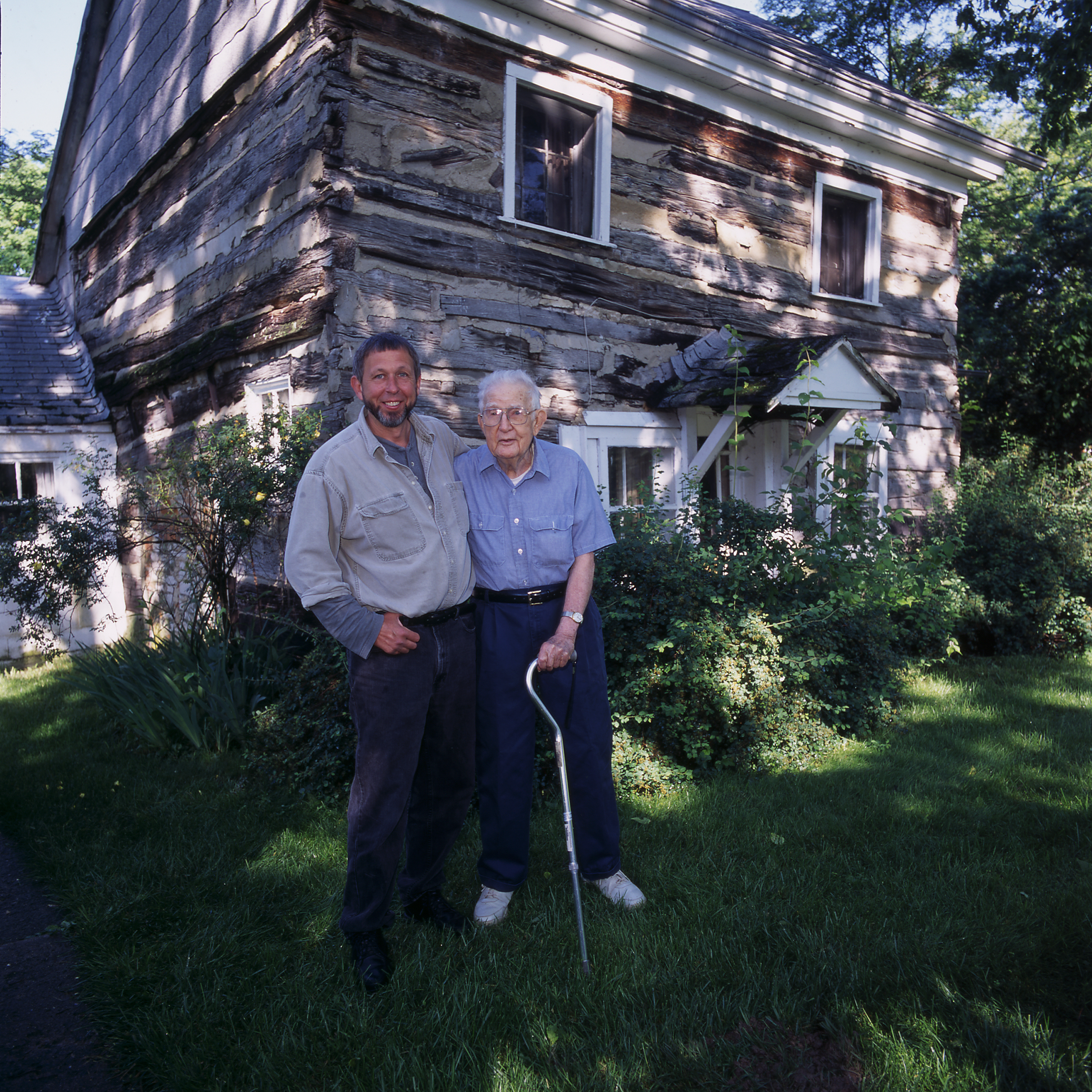
Christopher Ries with father Raymond at his childhood home

Christopher Ries was born to florists Raymond and Mildred Ries and was raised in a log cabin on a farm near Columbus, Ohio. As a young adult he expressed an interest in art and ceramics. Throughout high school he produced pottery in a makeshift studio in his parents’ root cellar.

In 1971 he matriculated to Ohio State University to pursue a Bachelor of Fine Arts degree in ceramics. He soon became more interested in the glass used to glaze pottery than the pottery itself. In order to explore glass as a medium for artistic expression, he built what became The Ohio State University's first glass studio and served as its first instructor. Ries spent the next several years blowing glass and investigating glass types, chemical compositions, and properties.

During his senior year at The Ohio State University, Ries attended a guest lecture given by Harvey Littleton. Littleton was struck by Ries's accomplishments as both a glass artist and teacher, and asked Ries to become his research assistant at the University of Wisconsin–Madison. Ries accepted the offer and enrolled at the institute the following autumn.

Ries spent the next two years under the mentorship of Littleton. Ries's interest in glass's optical properties grew, and began carving cold glass instead of blowing hot glass. Tools to sculpt large blocks of glass weren't available at the time, so Ries independently developed much of the equipment he needed during his spare time. He graduated the University of Wisconsin–Madison in 1978 with a master's degree in fine arts and returned to Columbus.

He lives with four of his children, Banks, Chase, Catherine and Caroline.

=== Career ===
After graduating the University of Wisconsin–Madison, Ries spent several years searching for the ideal glass to be used in sculpture. Ries's search ended when he discovered the lead crystal manufactured by Schott Optical (now Schott North America). For the next two years he regularly travelled to Duryea, Pennsylvania, to purchase pieces of cullet from Schott. He would then sculpt, carve, and polish these pieces in his studio in Columbus.

As Ries's technique developed, Dr. Franz Herkt, president of Schott Optical, invited Ries to work with the company as an independent contractor with the title Artist in Residence. Ries accepted the distinction and in 1986 signed an agreement which allowed him to work within the Duryea facility. He created a body of work which Schott and Ries co-produced and co-owned.

Ries also established a private studio in Tunkhannock, Pennsylvania, which he has used to explore concepts in glass and occasionally other media including wood and paint. Most of the masterworks Ries produced at the Schott facility were modeled after forms created at his private studio.

Ries's relationship with Schott continued until a fire destroyed his on-site studio on 3 March 2015. Production of large Ries studio work has ceased and is not expected to resume. His private studio in Tunkhannock, Pennsylvania is still operational.

== Artwork ==
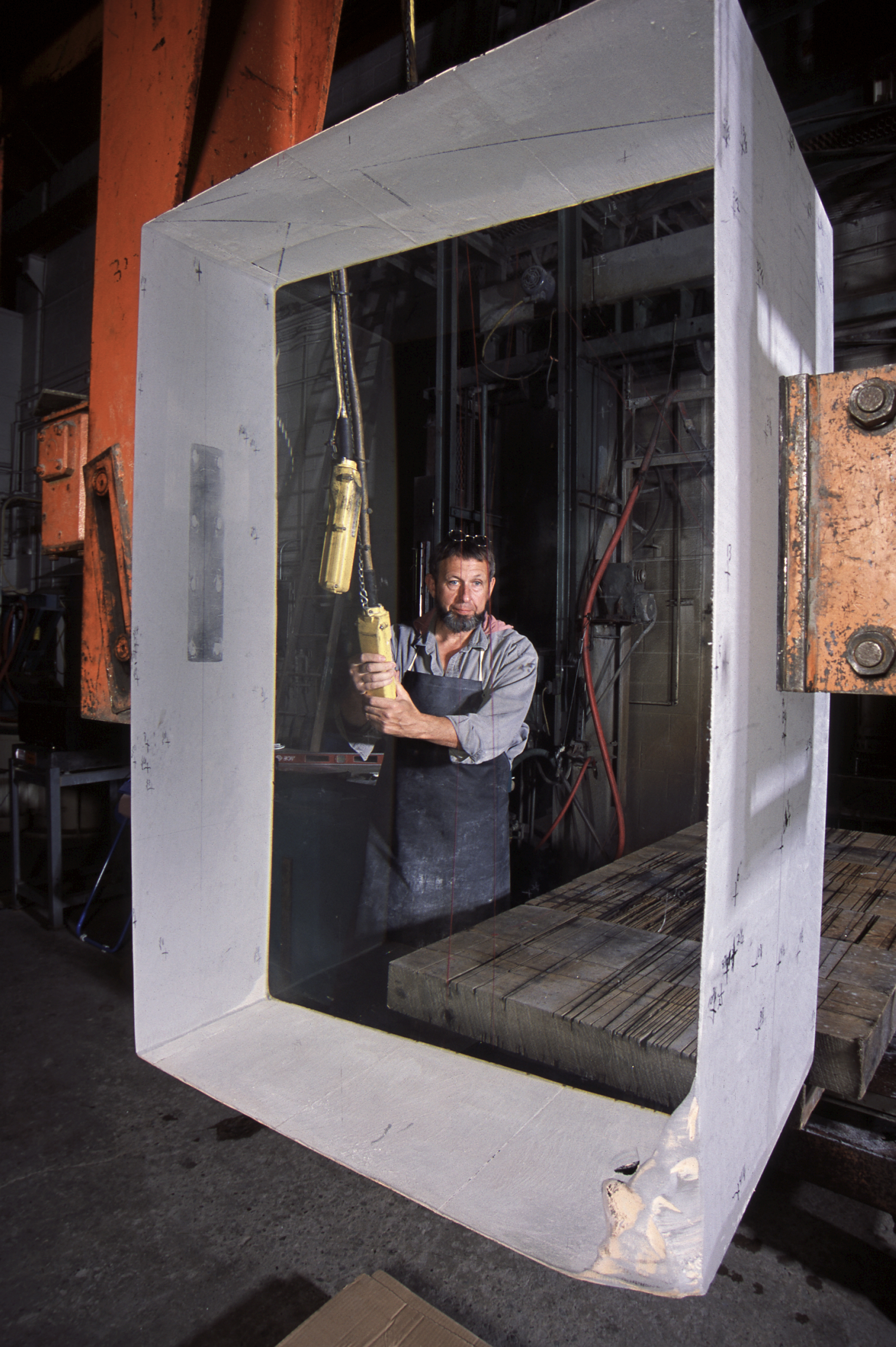
Ries with raw block of optical crystal at Schott Optical

Ries's sculptures are noted for their changing internal optical compositions and technical proficiency. Ries's primary medium is clear lead crystal, a glass with an unusually high refractive index, extreme light transmission in the visual range, and outstanding homogeneity. These qualities enable Ries to create the optical effects found within his work.

Ries begins with large blocks of optical glass and reduces them to the desired form by cutting, carving, grinding, and polishing them. His larger sculptures are taken from source material that can weigh over 4,000 pounds, and the process of reducing and polishing can take as much as a year.

Ries's Opus was at the time of its creation the world's largest monolithic glass sculpture. It weighs nearly 1,500 pounds (680 kilograms) and was sculpted from a 3,000 pounds (1,400 kilograms) block of glass. One of Ries's most famous works, the 1,100 pounds (500 kilograms) Sunflower IV, took four months to anneal and required a further 1,800 estimated hours to carve.

Contemporary critics have noted Ries's unique ability to exploit glass's optical properties for artistic expression. James Yood, professor of contemporary art theory and criticism at Northwestern University, called Ries's work "an art of such suggestiveness and finesse, of ceaseless transition and surprise that it constitutes one of the most intriguing exercises in the poetics of optics anywhere in contemporary art."

Ries himself characterizes his work as a "vessel for light," noting that "all that we know about the universe, the composition of the stars, and the distances within the universe is studied through light...It is the one medium that gathers, focuses, amplifies, transmits, filters, diffuses and reflects it. It is the quintessential medium for light. I see it all on a symbolic level."

== Gallery ==
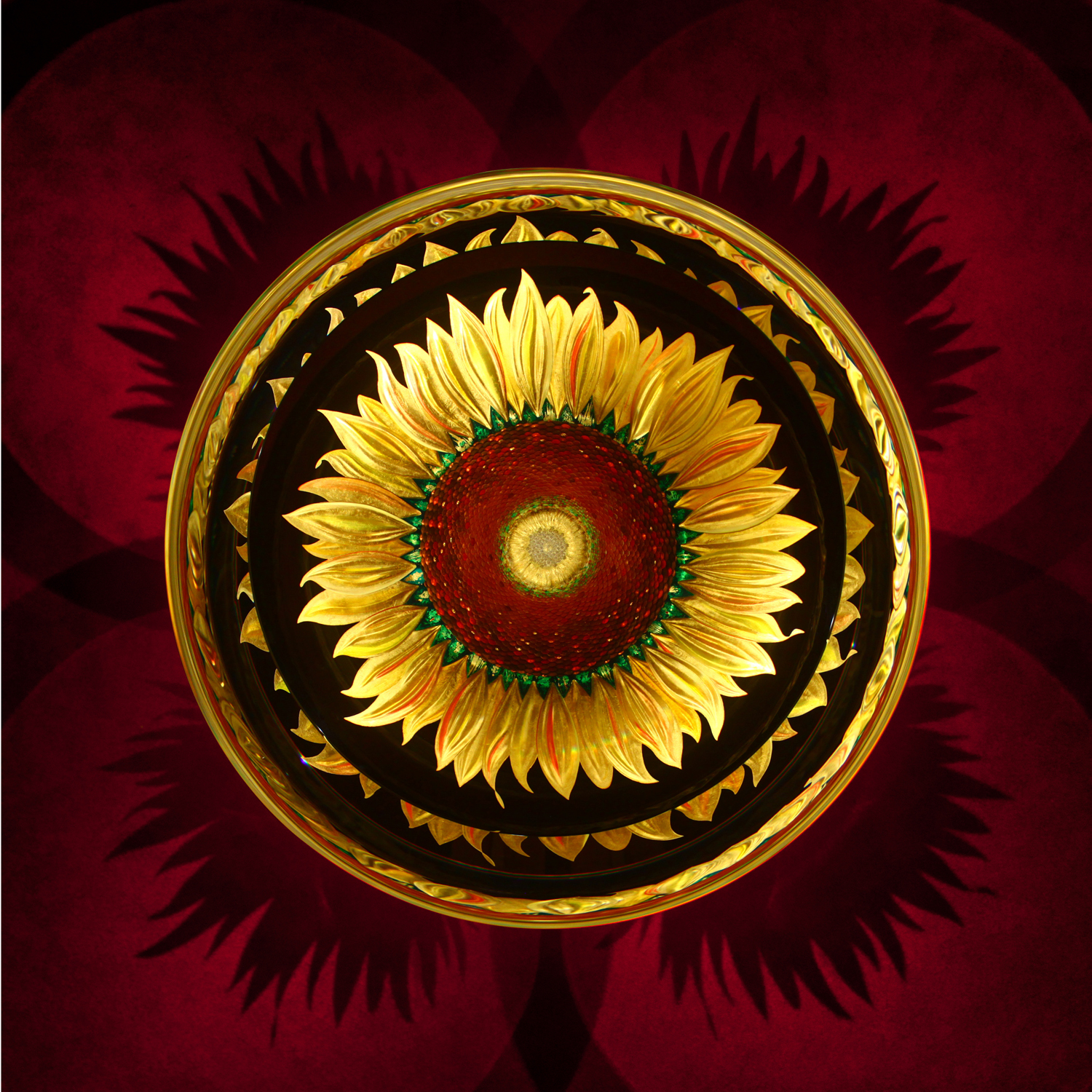
Sunflower

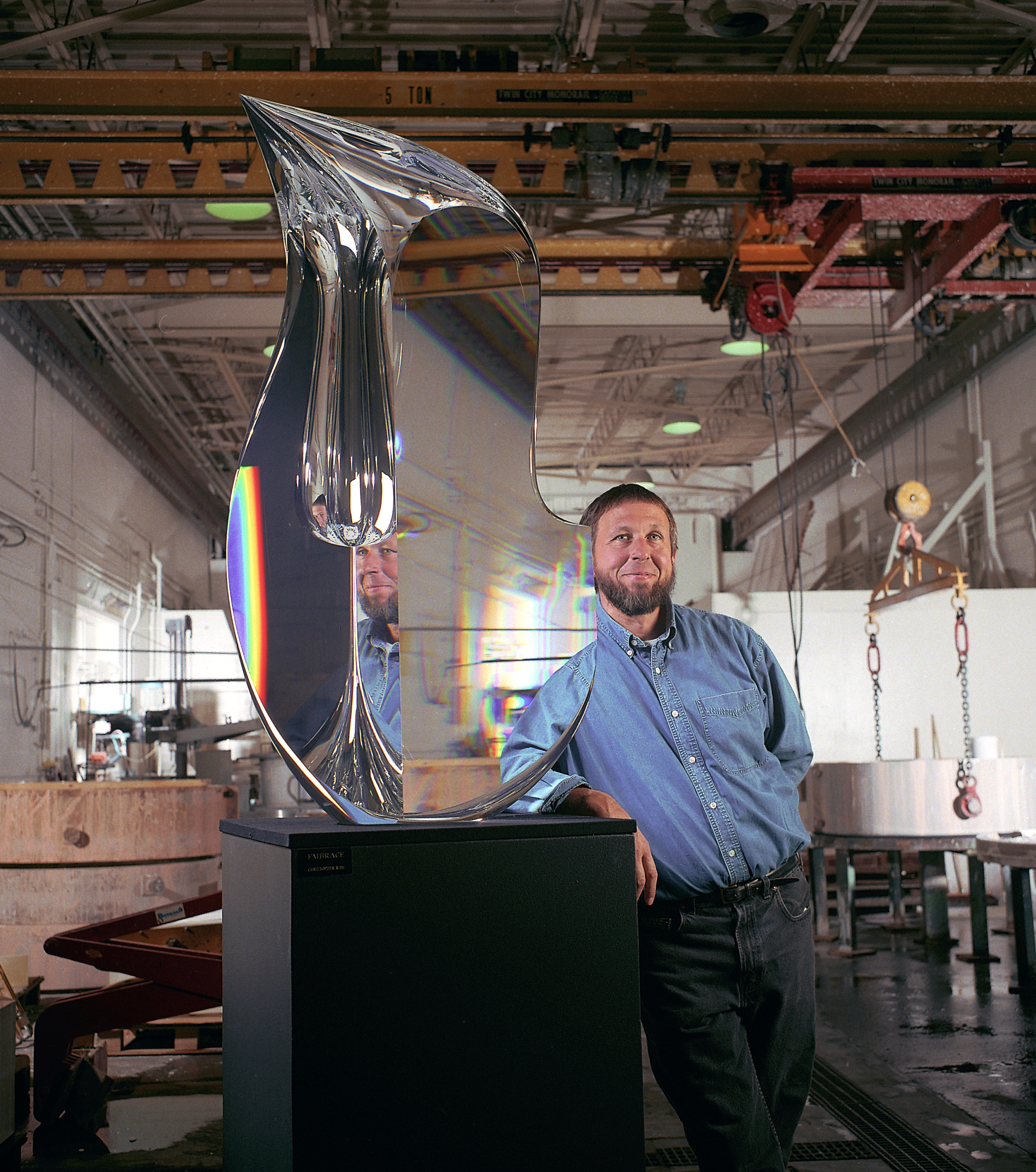
Ries with Embrace at Schott

== Awards and honors ==
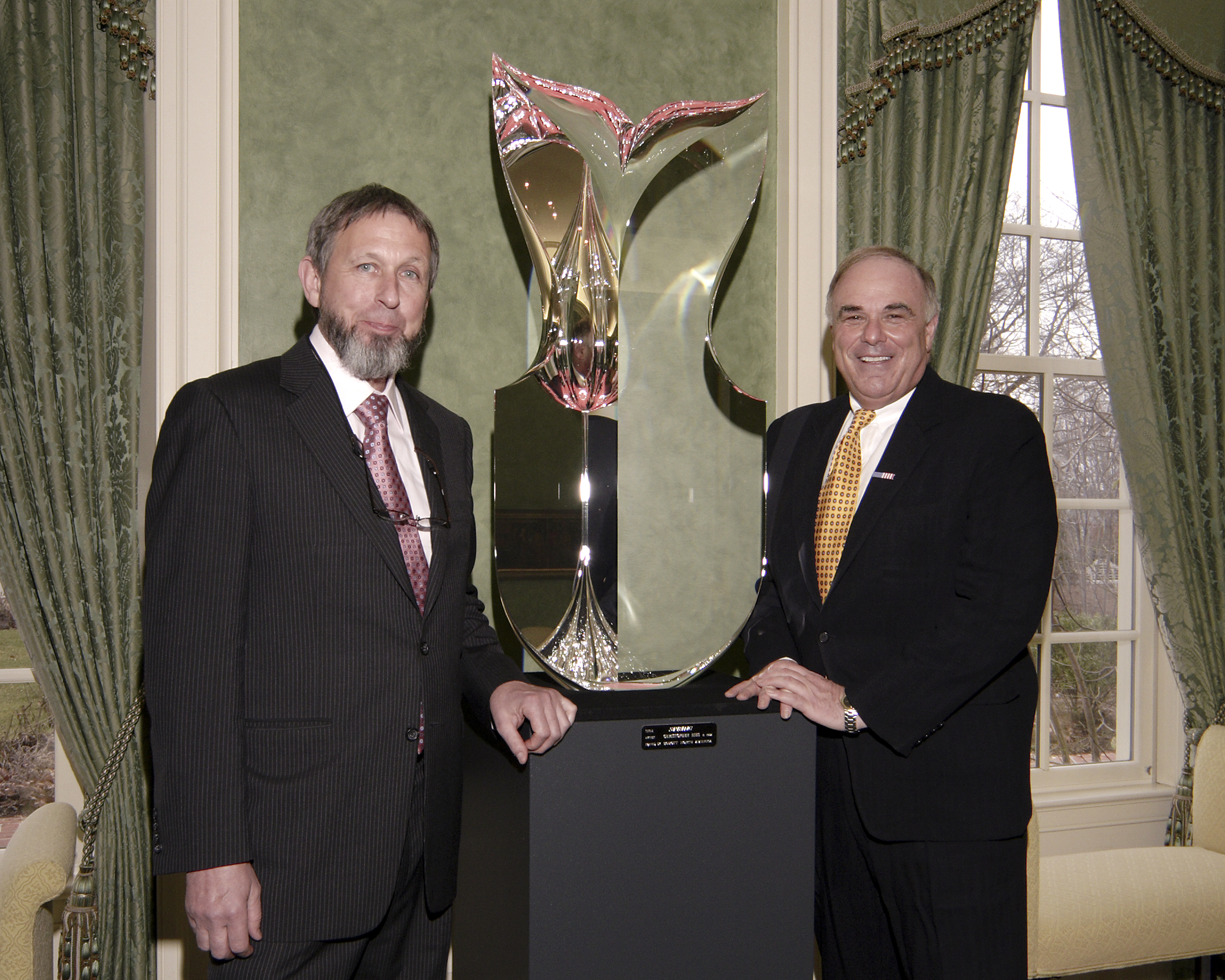
Christopher Ries with Ed Rendell during installation of Spring at the Pennsylvania Governor's mansion

Ries's works have won numerous awards and are exhibited in major collections and museums throughout the United States, Europe, and Japan, including the Corning Museum of Glass, the Cincinnati Art Museum, the National Heisey Glass Museum, the National Liberty Museum, the Cleveland Museum of Art, and the Tampa Museum of Art. Among the awards and honors he has received are the:

- 2010 Doctor of Humane Letters honorary degree, Misericordia University, Dallas, Pennsylvania
- 2005 Artist as Hero, National Liberty Museum, Philadelphia, Pennsylvania
- Distinguished Artist Award, University of the Arts, Philadelphia, Pennsylvania
- 1990 Ohioana Citation for Distinguished Service to Ohio in the Field of Art
- 1978–79 Aid to Individual Artists Fellowship, Ohio Arts Council
- 1974–75 Leo Yassenoff Scholarship

== Permanent collections ==
=== United States ===
- Arizona
  - University of Arizona, Tucson
- Florida
  - Tampa Museum of Art, Tampa
  - University of Central Florida, Orlando
- Indiana
  - Indianapolis Museum of Art, Indianapolis
- Louisiana
  - New Orleans Museum of Art, New Orleans
- Minnesota
  - Mayo Clinic, Rochester
- New Mexico
  - Wilford Gallery, Santa Fe
  - Lannan Foundation, Santa Fe
- New Jersey
  - Museum of American Glass, Millville
- New York
  - Corning Museum of Glass, Corning
- Ohio
  - Riverside Medical Hospital, Columbus
  - Port Columbus International Airport, Columbus
  - Columbus Museum of Art, Columbus
  - American Ceramic Society, Westerville
  - Toledo Museum of Art, Toledo
- Pennsylvania
  - National Liberty Museum, Philadelphia
  - Everhart Museum, Scranton
  - Governor's residence, Harrisburg
