= Leslie Jackson Chihuly =

American arts executive and philanthropist

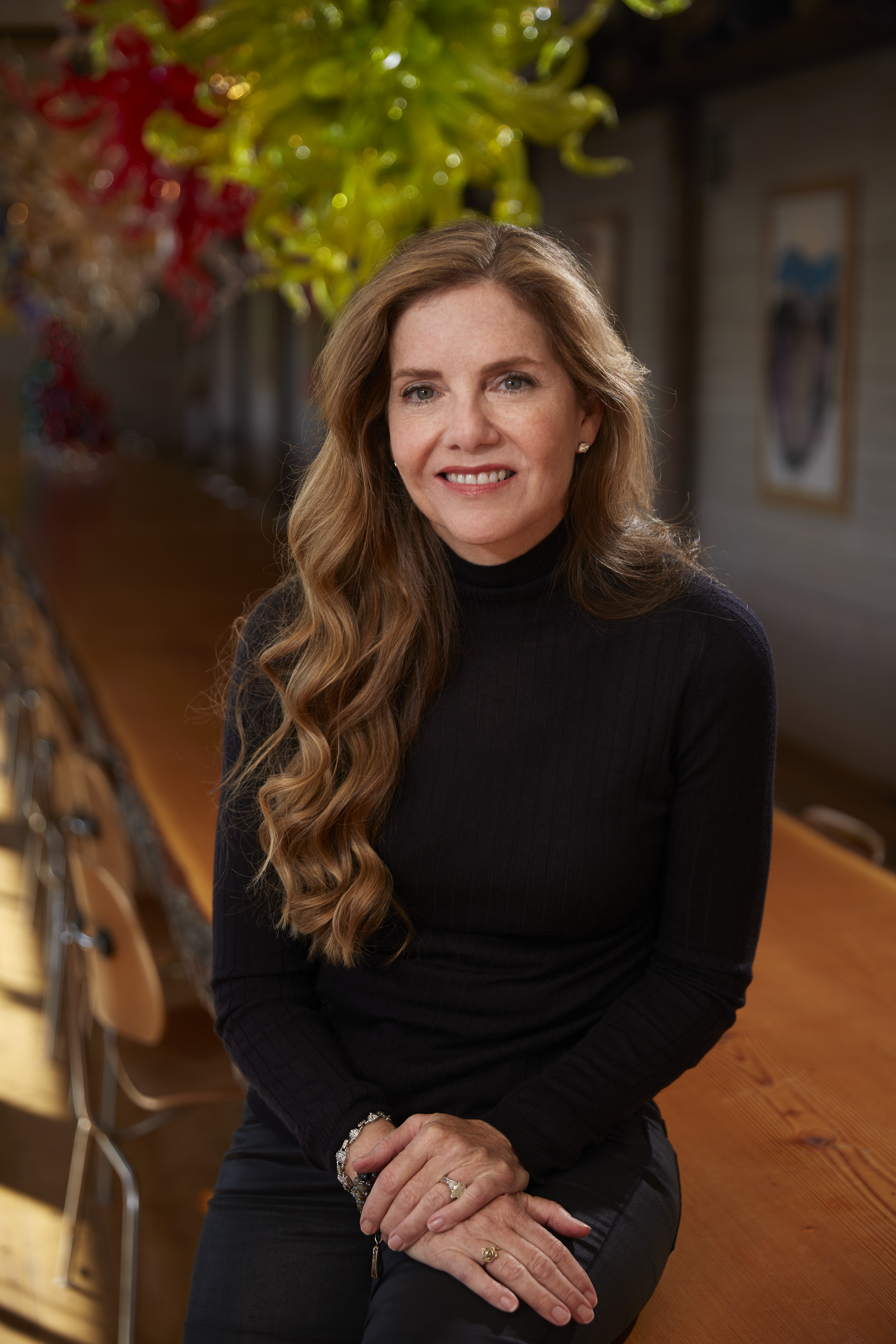
- Chihuly in 2018
- Born: May 1, 1961 (age 65); Oklahoma City, Oklahoma
- Education: Vassar College; University of Washington's Henry M. Jackson School of International Studies
- Occupations: CEO of Chihuly, Inc., which includes Chihuly Studio and Chihuly Workshop (1994–present)
- Board member of: Seattle Symphony; Vassar College; Pilchuck Glass School
- Spouse: Dale Chihuly (m. 2005)
- Children: 1

Leslie Jackson Chihuly (born May 1, 1961) is an American arts executive and philanthropist. She is the president and chief executive officer of Chihuly, Inc., which includes Chihuly Studio and Chihuly Workshop, both of which feature the artistic work and vision of her husband, Dale Chihuly. In 2018, she was elected as chair emerita of the Seattle Symphony Board after serving nine years as board chair and implementing a number of revitalizing changes. Those included filling the roles of CEO and music director with fresh talent, and taking the organization from financial challenge and organizational strife in 2009 to the stage of Carnegie Hall in 2014. Under her leadership, the symphony won three Grammy Awards and the Gramophone “Orchestra of the Year Award” in 2018. Leslie Chihuly serves on the boards of the Seattle Symphony, Vassar College and the Pilchuck Glass School. In 2022, President Joe Biden announced his intention to appoint Jackson Chihuly to the President’s Advisory Committee on the Arts.

== Early life and education ==
Jackson Chihuly was born in 1961 in Oklahoma City, Oklahoma. She is the daughter of Royal C. Jackson, a mechanical engineer, and Jo Morgan Jackson, an educator and volunteer, and has a younger sister and two older brothers. Royal C. Jackson died in 1993. Jo Morgan Jackson died in 2003. Jackson Chihuly grew up in Amarillo, Texas, and Guymon, Oklahoma.

She started studying flute and piano at age 5 and continues to play both today. She attended numerous music and writing camps as a child, including a poetry camp in Tahlequah, Oklahoma, led by Poet Laureate Donald Hall in the 1970s. In 1979, Jackson Chihuly enrolled at Vassar College. She spent her junior year – 1981-82 – abroad at Trinity College in Dublin, Ireland. She graduated from Vassar with a BA degree in English in 1983.

During her 20s – in the 1980s and early 1990s – Jackson Chihuly travelled throughout Europe, India, Thailand and China. She served as a production assistant on the PBS film “Democracy in Action,” a humorous take on American elections that featured Frank Zappa and Timothy Leary and aired in the United States and in Russia in 1992.

Jackson Chihuly enrolled at the University of Washington's Henry M. Jackson School of International Studies, graduating in 1993 with an MA in international studies. During her time there, she lived in Moscow, Russia, and interned at Moscow State University.

== Career ==
Jackson Chihuly worked for the Goodwill Arts Festival as part of the 1990 Goodwill Games. The New York Times called the festival “more significant for opening artistic frontiers than reducing world tensions.” She joined Chihuly, Inc., in 1994, became president on December 3, 2008, and was named president and CEO on January 20, 2015. In her role as president and CEO, Jackson Chihuly ensures ongoing organizational strength to support Dale Chihuly in realizing his vision, encompassing all aspects of his art, from large-scale commissions to museum exhibitions, and individual artworks to editions. Jackson Chihuly served as executive producer of Pilchuck: A Dance with Fire, the 2015 documentary on the history of the Pilchuck Glass School. The film won a 2016 Northwest Chapter Emmy Award for Best Documentary.

During her 15 years on the Seattle Symphony Board, nine years as its chair, Jackson Chihuly led the organization through a period of significant change, including the hiring of Music Director Ludovic Morlot and President and CEO Simon Woods. She created innovative fundraising events, such as a concert featuring Macklemore & Ryan Lewis, Russell Wilson and Ciara.

In 2018, Jackson Chihuly spoke at the University of Washington's Foster School of Business as part of its Leaders to Legends series about numerous aspects of leadership, and the importance of sustaining the energy and enthusiasm necessary to inspire others.

== Philanthropy ==
Together, Jackson Chihuly and her husband founded the Dale and Leslie Chihuly Foundation in 2009 to fund public education regarding all forms of art, and to provide support to artists and arts organizations. The Chihulys are involved with numerous nonprofit and philanthropic organizations both locally and nationally, with a focus on health, education, music and the arts. Their foundation's beneficiaries include Artist Trust, Hilltop Artists, Path with Art, the Hotshop Heroes program at the Museum of Glass and an artist lecture series at the University of Washington. In addition, the Chihulys have provided support to JDRF, Seattle International Film Festival, Mary's Place, Seattle Arts and Lectures, Seattle Art Museum, Tacoma Art Museum, and KEXP-FM.

Jackson Chihuly made a $2.5 million gift to the Seattle Symphony to create the Leslie Jackson Chihuly Chair in 2015, endowing the Symphony's executive leadership position in perpetuity. In 2017, the Chihulys donated five large artworks – valued at $3.4 million at the time – in Tacoma Union Station to the people of the United States via the U.S. General Services Administration. In 2017, Dale and Leslie Chihuly discussed Dale's struggle with bipolar disorder publicly together for the first time. Since then, Jackson Chihuly has stepped up her work to destigmatize mental illness. Among her efforts is participation in the national “Deconstructing Stigma” campaign through McLean Hospital. The project, which opened in December 2016, includes a photo exhibition and a collection of stories from mental ill people.

== Honors ==
- In 2022, President Joe Biden announced his intention to appoint Jackson Chihuly to the President’s Advisory Committee on the Arts, which provides guidance on programming at the John F. Kennedy Center for the Performing Arts in Washington, DC.
- In 2018 the University of Nevada, Las Vegas, College of Fine Art honored Jackson Chihuly for Extraordinary Achievements in the Arts.
- In 2017 the Women's University Club of Seattle Foundation honored Jackson Chihuly with a “Brava! Award” for her service to others and her advocacy for the arts.
- In 2015, she was given the “Women of Valor Award” by U.S. Sen. Maria Cantwell, honoring women who inspire and build up the community.
- In 2011 Jackson Chihuly was named as a “Women of Influence” by the Puget Sound Business Journal.

== Personal life ==
Jackson Chihuly and her husband, Dale Chihuly, married in 2005. They have one son.
