= National Liberty Museum =

Content museum in Philadelphia, Pennsylvania

Coordinates: 39.9489°N 75.1469°W

The National Liberty Museum
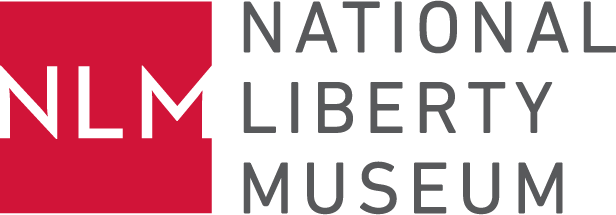

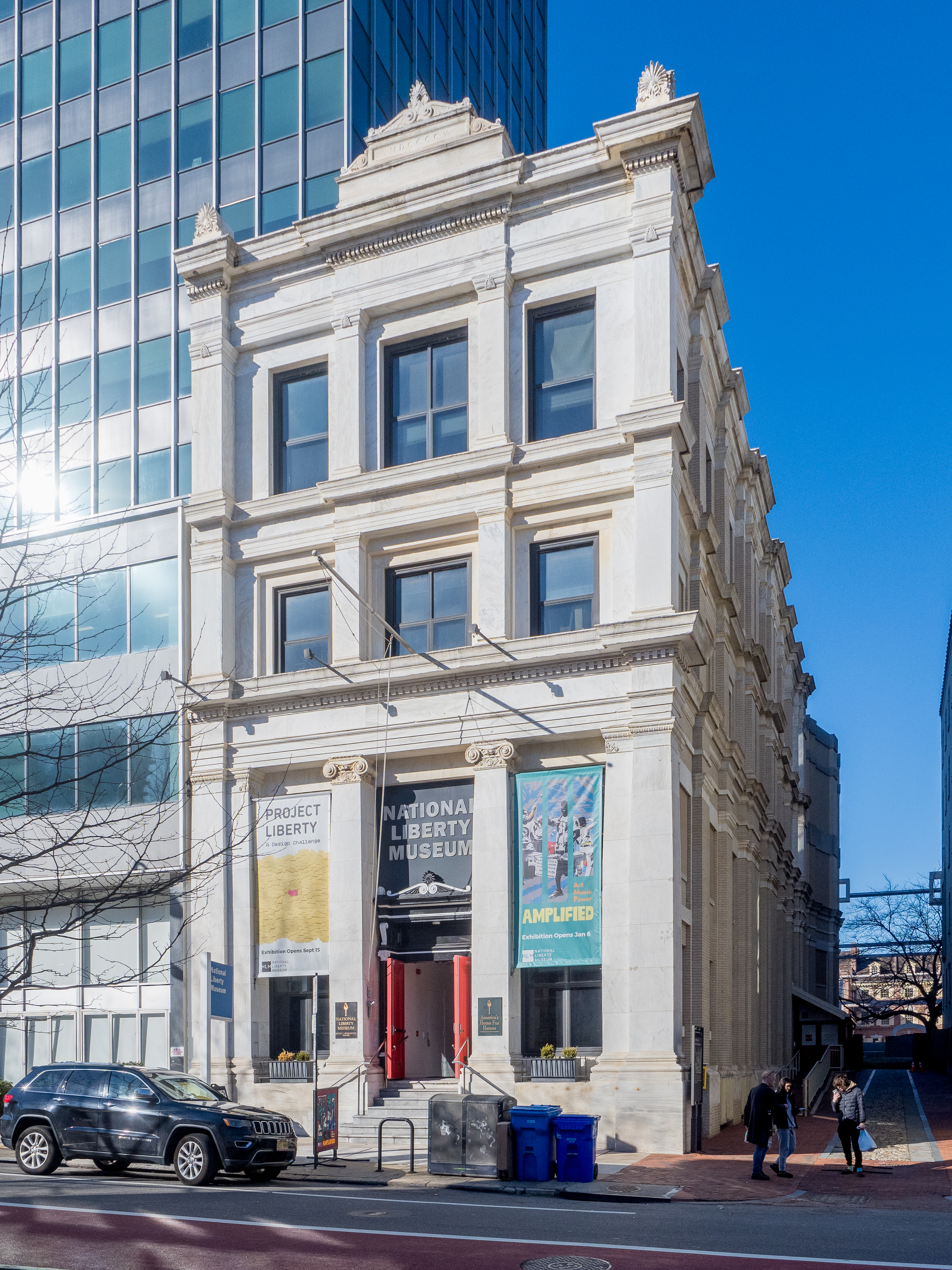
- The National Liberty Museum in 2024

- Location within Philadelphia
- Established: 2000
- Location: 321 Chestnut St. Philadelphia, Pennsylvania, U.S.
- Type: Community museum, history, art
- Key holdings: Flame of Liberty, sculpture by Dale Chihuly
- Visitors: 40,000 (2015)
- CEO: Alaine K. Arnott, PhD
- Website: libertymuseum.org

The National Liberty Museum is located at 321 Chestnut Street in Philadelphia, Pennsylvania. The museum opened to the public in January 2000. The museum states that it is an independent learning and exhibit center supported by visitors, community leaders and foundations.

A 20-foot tall glass art sculpture entitled Flame of Liberty created by American sculptor Dale Chihuly is on display at the museum.

== Overview ==
Based in Historic Philadelphia, the National Liberty Museum (NLM) offers a contemporary perspective on the practice of liberty. NLM's stated mission is to connect, educate, and inspire people to explore and advance the complex practice of liberty.

== History ==
The National Liberty Museum opened its doors in 2000 as both a museum and learning center. Founded by Irvin J. Borowsky and his daughter, Gwen Borowsky. Mr Borowsky was a proud lifelong Philadelphian and distinguished publisher, art collector, and philanthropist, and his daughter was an educator and founder of the Liberty Education Center providing training and resources to teachers. The Museum traditionally used contemporary glass art as an interpretive medium to explore the strength and fragility of liberty, while also coordinating an array of multidisciplinary exhibitions and complementary humanities-infused education and engagement programs.

== Civic Education ==
The National Liberty Museum's Young Heroes Outreach Program (YHOP) is a year–long initiative educating students in grades 4–8 in leadership and civic engagement through critical thinking, inquiry, and project–based learning. YHOP is a signature program of America250PA, the Pennsylvania Commission for the United States Semiquincentennial. With support from America250PA, YHOP will expand across the Commonwealth of Pennsylvania by 2026. YHOP also includes professional development and support for teachers, who work with NLM Educators to implement this program in their schools.

== Exhibitions ==
The Museum has four floors of permanent galleries and three seasonal exhibitions. NLM collaborates with scholars, artists, community partners, and external advisors to present dynamic and interactive exhibitions exploring the concept of liberty.

Past exhibitions include:

- Philly's Freedom, October 2, 2020 – April 25, 2022
- Craftivism, November 5, 2021 – February 8, 2022
- Graphic Content, June 18, 2021 – January 2, 2022
- La Brega: Art for Reimagining the World, April 1 – August 15, 2022
- This is My Home: Five Artists, Five Stories, June 4 – October 31, 2022
- truth* An Exhibition, September 9, 2022 – July 17, 2023
- Imagined Futures, January 20 – April 24, 2023
- Data Nation: Democracy in the Age of AI, June 1, 2023 – March 18, 2024
- Project Liberty: A Design Challenge, September 15, 2023 – August 31, 2024
