= William Warmus =

American transparent art curator and critic

William Warmus is a curator, art critic, and author focusing on transparent media.

== Education ==
Warmus holds a B.A. in art history from the University of Chicago in 1975 and was enrolled in the Masters in General Studies in the Humanities program in 1976.

== Career ==
He is a Fellow at the Corning Museum of Glass where he was the curator of Modern Glass from 1978 to 1984 as well as the founding editor of the New Glass Review, and editor of Glass Quarterly magazine from 1986 to 1989. He is the author of several books about sculpture, primarily focusing on artists working in glass. The Warmus archive is at the Rakow Library of the Corning Museum of Glass. As noted in "The Corning Museum of Glass: Notable Acquisitions 2016" (Corning: The Museum) p. 54:

"Warmus continues to be an important voice analyzing and evaluating contemporary glass. His journals chronicle the development of his theories, which predicted the end of the Studio Glass movement (1995) and posited "Glass Secessionism" with the artist Tim Tate (American, b. 1960). Warmus's philosophy of "Reticulate Aesthetics" considers the structure of art as a net or web, rather than a hierarchy."

Warmus also writes about the aesthetics of the ocean realm, which has influenced his art criticism. His theory of reticulate aesthetics is outlined in "From a Tree to a Web," American Craft, v.75, no.2, April/May 2015, pp. 104–107. His observations about the end of the studio glass movement are in "The End?," Glass Quarterly, no. 60, Fall 1995, pp. 42–45. Critic and curator Lydia Matthews, writing in American Craft Inquiry (“Daring to Dive Deeply: A Conversation about Craft Writing and Criticism” Volume One, Issue One, November 2016) observed that Warmus developed his theory of Reticulate Aesthetics partly as a response to the critical positions of Clement Greenberg:

“To address this expansive complexity in the contemporary craft scene, Warmus increasingly recognized that Greenberg's focus on materiality and form alone no longer seemed viable. Inspired by the kind of embodied knowledge acquired through experiences as a scuba diver, he began to envision a new way of looking at craft – one more akin to viewing the rich underwater world.

He described this analytical viewpoint as “reticulate,” which the Merriam-Webster dictionary defines as: “genetic recombination involving diverse interbreeding populations.” There is no judging “good,” “better,” “best” when comparing an octopus, shark, and a coral, so why would you want to impose hierarchical critical criteria to “species” in the craft world rather than seeing them as coexisting or hybridizing within a larger, more intricate ecosystem? Reticulate criticism proposes a more horizontal, weblike, and networked approach to writing about craft, one which recognizes that our field evolves organically over time, in response to specific environmental conditions.”

In 2020 Warmus curated “Venice and American Studio Glass” with Tina Oldknow at the Stanze del Vetro Museum in Venice, exploring the profound impact of Venice on American Studio Glass artists, beginning in the 1960s. In 2022 he curated “Years of Glass” at the Norton Museum in Palm Beach, exploring how glass as a medium is integrated into a contemporary fine art museum collection. In 2023 he co-authored “The Boathouse: The Artist’s Studio of Dale Chihuly” distributed by the University of Washington Press, ISBN 978-1-5768-4119-8.

== Published books ==
- New Glass: A Worldwide Survey. Corning Museum of Glass. 1979. ISBN 9780486241562.
- Buechner, Thomas C.; Warmus, William (1981). Czechoslovakian Diary: 1980. Corning NY: Corning Museum of Glass. ISBN 978-0872901025.
- New Glass Review 1-5. Corning NY: Corning Museum of Glass. 1980–1984.
- Warmus, William (1984). Emile Gallé: Dreams into Glass. Corning NY: Corning Museum of Glass. ISBN 9780872901094.
- Warmus, William; Geldzahler, Henry (1988). Dan Dailey: Simple Complexities in Drawings and Glass 1872-1987 (Philadelphia College of the Arts). University of Washington Press. ISBN 9780295966632.
- Warmus, William (1989). The Venetians: Modern Glass 1919-1990. Muriel Karasik Gallery. ISBN 9780962458507.
- Self, Dana; Warmus, William (1996). Chihuly Over Venice. Seattle: Chihuly Workshop. ISBN 9781576840054.
- Warmus, William (commentary) (2000). Chihuly in the Light of Jerusalem 2000. Portland Press. ISBN 9781576840160.
- Warmus, William (2000). The Essential Dale Chihuly. New York: Harry Abrams. ISBN 0-8109-5812-0.
- Vizner, Frantisek; Warmus, William (2001). Vizner: Glass 1951-2001. New York: Barry Friedman. ISBN 9788023875539.
- Warmus, William (2001). The Essential Louis C. Tiffany. New York: Harry Abrams. ISBN 9780810958289.
- Warmus, William (2003). The Essential René Lalique. New York: Harry Abrams. ISBN 9780810958364.
- Warmus, William (2003). Fire and Form. Norton Museum of Art. ISBN 9780943411392.
- Mentasti, Rose Barovier; Warmus, William (2003). Yoichi Ohira: A Phenomenon in Glass. New York: Rizzoli. ISBN 9780972310802.
- Warmus, William; Kuspit, Donald (2005). Tom Patti: Illuminating the Invisible. Seattle: Museum of Glass. ISBN 9780295984735.
- Warmus, William (2006). William Morris. Native Species. The George R. Stroemple Collection. Belzar Springs Press. ISBN 9780978869502.
- Warmus, William (2007). Dan Dailey. New York: Harry N. Abrams. ISBN 9780810993198.
- Close, Timothy; Minkoff, Robert; Page, Andrew; Warmus, William (2011). Beauty Beyond Nature: The Glass Art of Paul Stankard. Robert M. Minkoff Foundation. ISBN 9780615473628.
- Warmus, William; Burkhalter, Laura (2013). Transparencies: Contemporary Art & A History of Glass. Des Moines Art Center. ISBN 9781879003668.
- Barovier, Rosa; Warmus, William; Patino, Maricruz (2013). Narcissus Quagliata: Architypes and Visions in Light and Glass. Arnoldsche. ISBN 9783897903784.
- Ricke, Helmut; Warmus, William (2016). Art Deco Glass: The David Huchthausen Collection. Tacoma: Museum of Glass. ISBN 9780692781937.
- Warmus, William; Oldknow, Tina (2020). Venice and American Studio Glass. Milan: Skira. ISBN 9788857243870.
