= Dale Chihuly =

American glass sculptor and entrepreneur

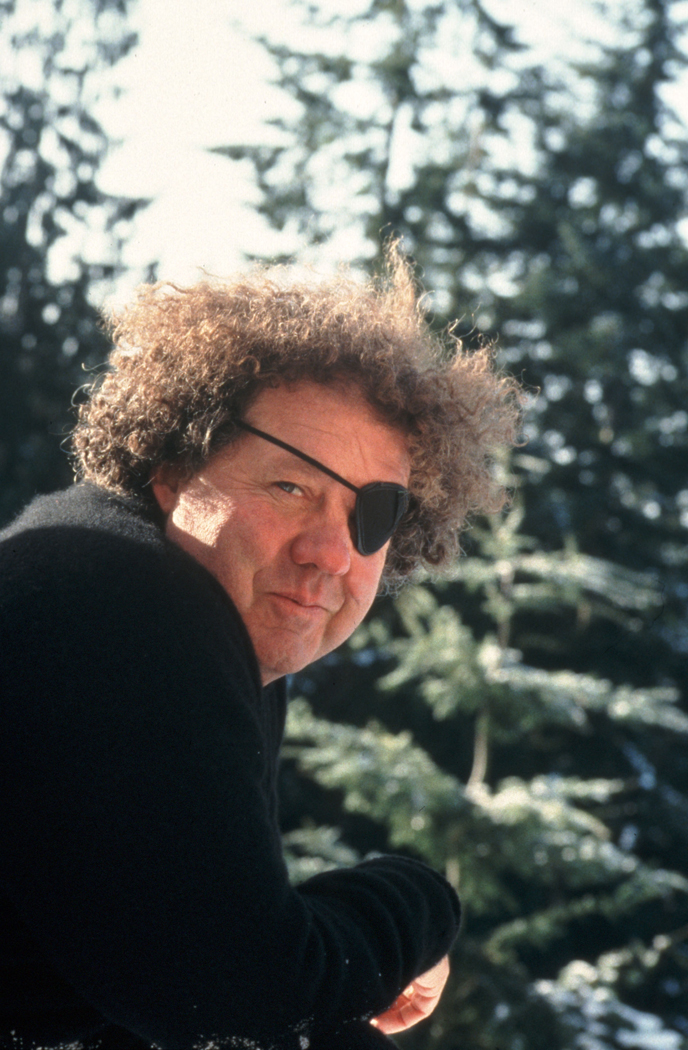
- Chihuly in 1992
- Born: Dale Patrick Chihuly; September 20, 1941 (age 85); Tacoma, Washington, U.S.
- Education: College of Puget Sound; University of Washington (BA); University of Wisconsin–Madison (MS); Rhode Island School of Design (MFA)
- Known for: Glass art
- Spouse: Leslie Jackson Chihuly
- Children: 1

Dale Patrick Chihuly (/tʃɪˈhuːli/ chih-HOO-lee; born September 20, 1941) is an American glass artist. He is well known in the field of blown glass, "moving it into the realm of large-scale sculpture".

== Early life ==
Dale Patrick Chihuly was born on September 20, 1941, in Tacoma, Washington. His parents were George and Viola Chihuly; his paternal grandfather was born in Koškovce, a village in eastern Slovakia. In 1957, his older brother and only sibling George died in a Navy aviation training accident in Pensacola, Florida. In 1958, Chihuly's father died of a heart attack at the age of 51.

Chihuly had no interest in continuing his formal education after graduating from Woodrow Wilson High School in 1959. However, at his mother's urging, he enrolled at the College of Puget Sound. A year later, he transferred to the University of Washington in Seattle to study interior design. In 1961, he joined the Delta Kappa Epsilon fraternity (Kappa Epsilon chapter), and the same year he learned how to melt and fuse glass. In 1962, Chihuly dropped out of the university to study art in Florence. He later traveled to the Middle East where he met architect Robert Landsman. Their meeting and his time abroad spurred Chihuly to return to his studies. In 1963, he took a weaving class where he incorporated glass shards into tapestries. He received an award for his work from the Seattle Weavers Guild in 1964. Chihuly graduated from the University of Washington in 1965 with a Bachelor of Arts degree in interior design.

Chihuly began experimenting with glassblowing in 1965, and in 1966 he received a full scholarship to attend the University of Wisconsin–Madison. He studied under Harvey Littleton, who had established the first glass program in the United States at the university. In 1967, Chihuly received a Master of Science degree in sculpture. After graduating, he enrolled at the Rhode Island School of Design, where he met and became close friends with Italo Scanga. Chihuly earned a Master of Fine Arts degree in sculpture from the RISD in 1968. That same year, he was awarded a Louis Comfort Tiffany Foundation grant for his work in glass, as well as a Fulbright Fellowship. He traveled to Venice to work at the Venini factory on the island of Murano, where he first saw the team approach to blowing glass. After returning to the United States, Chihuly spent the first of four consecutive summers teaching at the Haystack Mountain School of Crafts in Deer Isle, Maine. In 1969, he traveled to Europe, in part to meet Erwin Eisch in Germany and Stanislav Libenský and Jaroslava Brychtová in Czechoslovakia. Chihuly donated a portion of a large exhibit to his alma mater, the University of Wisconsin, in 1997 and it is on permanent display in the Kohl Center. In 2013 the university awarded him an Honorary Doctorate of Fine Arts.

== Career ==
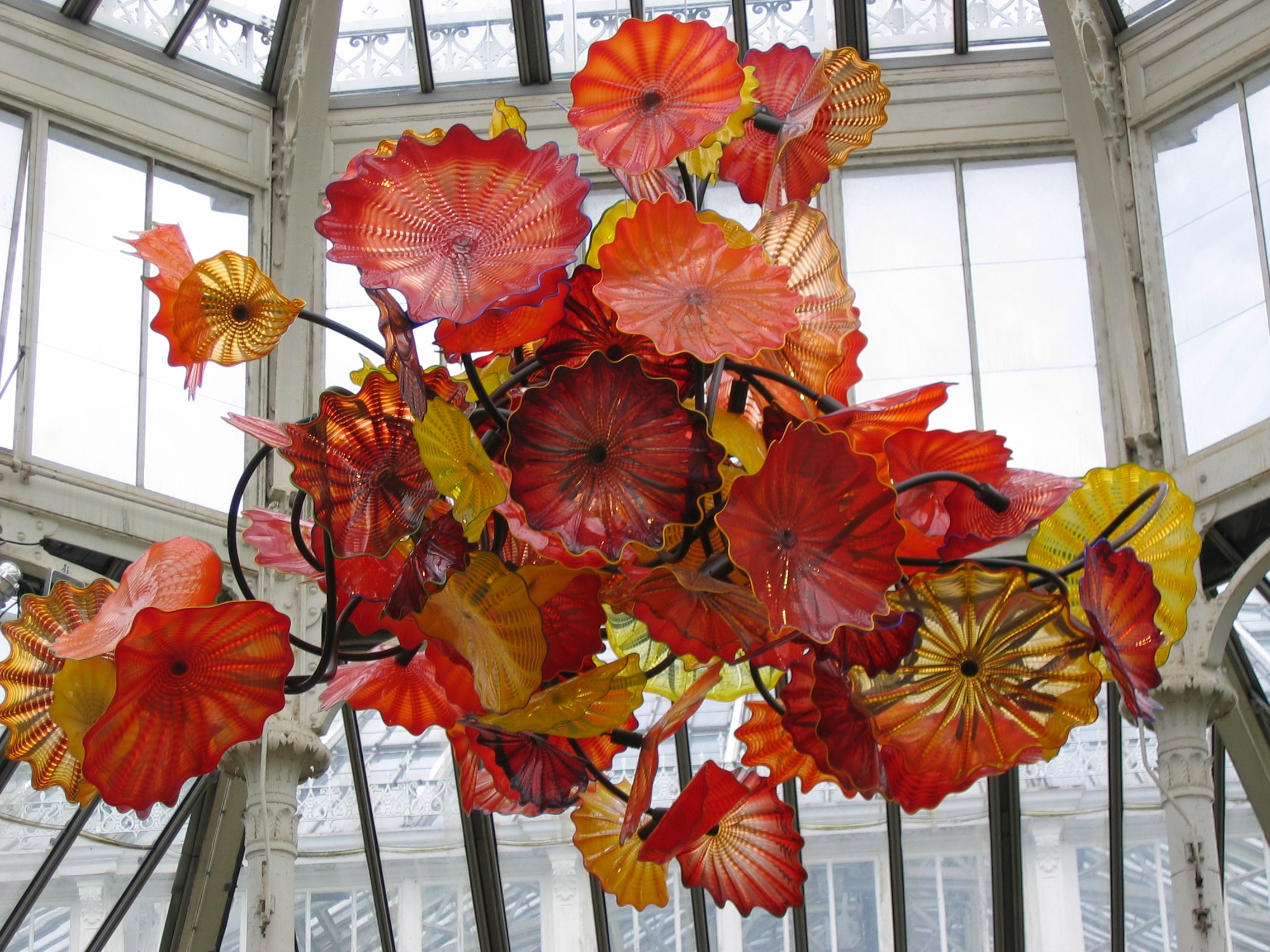
A Chihuly chandelier at Kew Gardens

In 1971, with Ruth Tamara and Anne Gould Hauberg, Chihuly co-founded the Pilchuck Glass School near Stanwood, Washington. Chihuly also founded the HillTop Artists program in Tacoma, Washington at Hilltop Heritage Middle School and Wilson High School.

In 1976, while Chihuly was in England, he was involved in a head-on car accident that propelled him through the windshield. His face was severely cut by glass and he was blinded in his left eye. After recovering, he continued to blow glass until he dislocated his right shoulder in 1979 while bodysurfing.

In 1983, Chihuly returned to his native Pacific Northwest where he continued to develop his own work at the Pilchuck Glass School, which he had helped to found in 1971. No longer able to hold the glassblowing pipe, he hired others to do the work. Chihuly explained the change in a 2006 interview, saying "Once I stepped back, I liked the view", and said that it allowed him to see the work from more perspectives, enabling him to anticipate problems earlier. Chihuly's role has been described as "more choreographer than dancer, more supervisor than participant, more director than actor". San Diego Union-Tribune reporter Erin Glass wrote that she "wonders at the vision of not just the artist Chihuly, but the very successful entrepreneur Chihuly, whose estimated sales by 2004 was reported by The Seattle Times as $29 million."

Chihuly and his team of artists were the subjects of the documentary Chihuly Over Venice. They were also featured in the documentary Chihuly in the Hotshop, syndicated to public television stations by American Public Television starting on November 1, 2008.

In 2010, the Space Needle Corporation submitted a proposal for an exhibition of Chihuly's work at a site in the Seattle Center, in competition with proposals for other uses from several other groups. The project, which sees the new Chihuly exhibition hall occupy the site of the former Fun Forest amusement park in the Seattle Center park and entertainment complex, received the final approval from the Seattle City Council on April 25, 2011. Called Chihuly Garden and Glass, it opened May 21, 2012.

=== 2006 lawsuit ===
In 2006, Chihuly filed a lawsuit against his former longtime employee, glassblower Bryan Rubino, and businessman Robert Kaindl, claiming copyright and trademark infringement. Kaindl's pieces used titles Chihuly had employed for his own works, such as Seaforms and Ikebana, and resembled the construction of Chihuly's pieces. Legal experts stated that influence on art style did not constitute copyright infringement. Chihuly settled the lawsuit with Rubino initially, and later with Kaindl as well.

== Works ==
Regina Hackett, a Seattle Post-Intelligencer art critic, provided a chronology of Chihuly's work during the 1970s, 1980s, and 1990s. Chihuly's oeuvre can be categorized into a number of ongoing series which include: Navajo Blanket series, the Basket series, the Seaform series, the Macchia series, the Persian series, the Venetian series, the Ikebana series, and the Floats series.

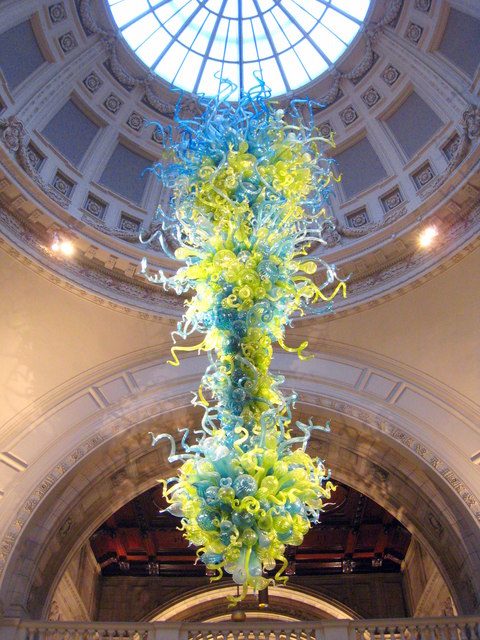
A Chihuly chandelier at the V&A Museum

- 1975: Navajo Blanket Series, in which patterns of Navajo blankets were painted onto glass
- 1977: Northwest Coast Basket Series, baskets inspired by Northwest coast Indian baskets he had seen as a child
- 1980: Seaform Series, transparent sculptures of thin glass, strengthened by ribbed strands of color
- 1981: Macchia Series, featuring every color available in the studio
- 1986: Persian Series, inspired by Middle East glass from the 12th- to 14th-century, featuring more restrained color and room-sized installations
- 1988: Venetian Series, improvisations based on Italian Art Deco
- 1989: Ikebana Series, glass flower arrangements inspired by ikebana
- 1990: Venetian Series returns, this time in a more eccentric form
- 1991: Niijima Floats, six-foot spheres of intricate color inspired by Japanese glass fishing floats from the island of Niijima from Chihuly's website
- 1992: Chandeliers, starting modestly but by the middle of the decade involving a multitude of glass orbs and shapes that in some works look like flowers, others like breasts, and still others like snakes. Chihuly has also produced a sizable volume of "Irish cylinders", which are more modest in conception than his blown glass works.

For his exhibition in Jerusalem, in 1999–2000, in addition to the glass pieces, he had enormous blocks of transparent ice brought in from an Alaskan artesian well and formed a wall, echoing the stones of the nearby Citadel. Lights with color gels were set up behind them for illumination. Chihuly said the melting wall represented the "dissolution of barriers" between people. This exhibit holds the world record for most visitors to a temporary exhibit with more than 1.3 million visitors.

In 1999, Chihuly's "Millennium Tree" was present in the East Wing of the Clinton White House during a Millenium celebration. The tree now resides in the William J. Clinton Presidential Library and Museum.

Two of Chihuly's pieces can also be found at two casino resorts owned by MGM Resorts International: one in the reception area of the Bellagio on the Las Vegas Strip, and the other in the VIP lobby of the MGM Macau in Macau, China. The piece at the Bellagio, titled Fiori di Como, holds the Guinness World Record for largest glass sculpture. In July 2001, in response to positive feedback from guests who viewed the installation at Bellagio, Chihuly partnered with Bellagio to open a store that sold some of the artist's original works, as well as books and videos about the artist. However, the store has since been marked permanently closed on Google Maps.

There is also one piece titled Blue River in the Casino of the Sky at Mohegan Sun: Casino and Resort in Uncasville, CT. The distinctive cobalt blue, silver and clear colored glass sculpture, measuring fourteen feet in width, soars twenty-five feet above visitors, creating a spectacular centerpiece.

=== Exhibitions ===
- 1995: Chihuly Exhibition, National Botanic Gardens of Ireland, Glasnevin, Ireland
- 1996: Chihuly Over Venice, Venice, Italy
- 1999–2000: Chihuly in the Light of Jerusalem 2000, Tower of David, Jerusalem
- 1999–2000: Dale Chihuly: Masterworks in Glass, National Gallery of Australia in Canberra, and JamFactory in Adelaide, Australia
- 2001: Chihuly at the V&A, Victoria and Albert Museum, London
- 2001–2002: Chihuly In The Park: A Garden Of Glass, Garfield Park Conservatory, Chicago, Illinois
- 2002: Winter Olympic Exhibition, Salt Lake City, Utah
- 2003: Color and Light: Chihuly at the Frederik Meijer Gardens & Sculpture Park, Frederik Meijer Gardens & Sculpture Park, Grand Rapids, Michigan
- 2004: Chihuly Across Florida: Masterworks in Glass, Orlando Museum of Art and Museum of Fine Arts in St. Petersburg, Florida, Jan. 18 – May 30, 2004
- 2004: Chihuly in the Garden, Atlanta Botanical Garden, Atlanta, Georgia
- 2005: Gardens of Glass, Kew Gardens, London.
- 2005: Modern and Contemporary American Art (1900 to present), Kalamazoo Institute of Arts, Kalamazoo, Michigan
- 2005–2007: Chihuly at Fairchild, Fairchild Tropical Botanic Garden, Coral Gables, Florida
- 2006: Missouri Botanical Garden, St. Louis, Missouri
- 2006: Oisterwijk Sculptuur, Oisterwijk, Netherlands
- 2006: New York Botanical Garden, New York, New York
- 2007: Wrapped In Tradition: The Chihuly Collection of American Indian Trade Blankets, Mayborn Museum Complex, Waco, Texas
- 2007: Chihuly at Phipps: Gardens and Glass, Phipps Conservatory, Pittsburgh, Pennsylvania
- 2008: Chihuly at the de Young, de Young Museum, San Francisco, California
- 2009: Chihuly: Day and Night, Desert Botanical Garden, Phoenix, Arizona
- 2009: Chihuly Illuminated, Columbus Museum of Art, Columbus, Ohio
- 2009: Chihuly: Recent Work, Naples Museum of Art, Naples, Florida, US
- 2010: Chihuly at Cheekwood, Cheekwood Botanical Gardens, Nashville, Tennessee
- 2010: Chihuly at the Salk, Salk Institute for Biological Studies, La Jolla, California
- 2010: Chihuly at Frederik Meijer Gardens & Sculpture Park: A New Eden, Frederik Meijer Gardens & Sculpture Park, Grand Rapids, Michigan
- 2010–2011: Chihuly at the Frist, Frist Art Museum, Nashville, Tennessee
- 2011: Through the Looking Glass, Boston Museum of Fine Arts, Boston, Massachusetts
- 2012: Chihuly at The Dallas Arboretum, Dallas Arboretum, Dallas, Texas
- 2012: Chihuly at the Virginia Museum of Fine Arts, Virginia Museum of Fine Arts, Richmond, Virginia
- 2013: Chihuly, Un univers à couper le souffle (Chihuly: Utterly Breathtaking), Montreal Museum of Fine Arts, Montreal, Quebec, Canada
- 2013–2014: Chihuly in the Garden, Desert Botanical Garden, Phoenix, Arizona
- 2014: Chihuly Denver, Denver Botanic Gardens, Denver, Colorado
- 2014–2015: Dale Chihuly's Exhibition at The Clinton Presidential Center, William J. Clinton Presidential Library and Museum, Little Rock, Arkansas
- 2016: Chihuly Venetians, Lauren Rogers Museum of Art, Laurel, Mississippi
- 2016: Chihuly, Royal Ontario Museum, Toronto, Ontario, Canada
- 2016: Chihuly in the Garden, Atlanta Botanical Garden
- 2017: Chihuly, New York Botanical Garden, Bronx, New York
- 2017: Chihuly: In the Forest, Crystal Bridges, Bentonville, Arkansas
- 2017: Chihuly at the Catalina Island Museum, Ada Blanche Wrigley Schreiner Building, Avalon, California
- 2018: Chihuly at Biltmore Biltmore House, Asheville, North Carolina
- 2019: Reflections on nature, Kew Gardens, London
- 2020: Chihuly: Celebrating Nature, Franklin Park Conservatory and Botanical Gardens, Columbus, Ohio
- 2020 "Bridge and Chandelier," Wichita Art Museum, Wichita, Kansas
- 2020–2021: Chihuly at Cheekwood, Cheekwood Botanical Gardens, Nashville, Tennessee
- 2020–2021: Rose Crystal Tower, New Orleans Botanical Garden, New Orleans, Louisiana
- 2020–2021: Dreaming Forms: Chihuly Then and Now, The Baker Museum, Artis-Naples, Naples, Florida
- 2021: Chihuly: Whitestone Karuizawa, Karuizawa New Art Museum, Karuizawa, Nagano, Japan
- 2021: Chihuly: Whitestone Tokyo, Whitestone Ginza New Gallery and Online Gallery, Chūō, Tokyo, Japan
- 2021: Dale Chihuly: Glass in Bloom, Gardens by the Bay, Singapore
- 2021: Chihuly, Sandra Ainsley Gallery, Toronto, Ontario, Canada
- 2021–2022: Chihuly in the Desert, Desert Botanical Garden, Phoenix, Arizona and Taliesin West, Scottsdale, Arizona
- 2022: Chihuly, Schantz Galleries Contemporary Glass, Stockbridge, Massachusetts
- 2022: Chihuly, Traver Gallery, Seattle, Washington
- 2022–2023: A Lasting Friendship: Gerard Cafesjian and Dale Chihuly, Cafesjian Art Trust Museum, Shoreview, Minnesota
- 2022–2023: Dale Chihuly: Blanket Cylinders 1975–2016, The Community Library, Ketchum, Idaho
- 2023: Laguna Murano Chandalier: From the George R. Stroemple Collection, Lauren Rogers Museum of Art, Laurel, Mississippi
- 2023: Chihuly in the Garden, Missouri Botanical Garden, St. Louis, Missouri
- 2024: Chihuly in the Botanic Garden: the Australian debut of Chihuly's Garden Cycle, in the Adelaide Botanic Garden, Adelaide, South Australia
Chihuly in the Botanic Garden (Adelaide, Australia, 2024-2025)
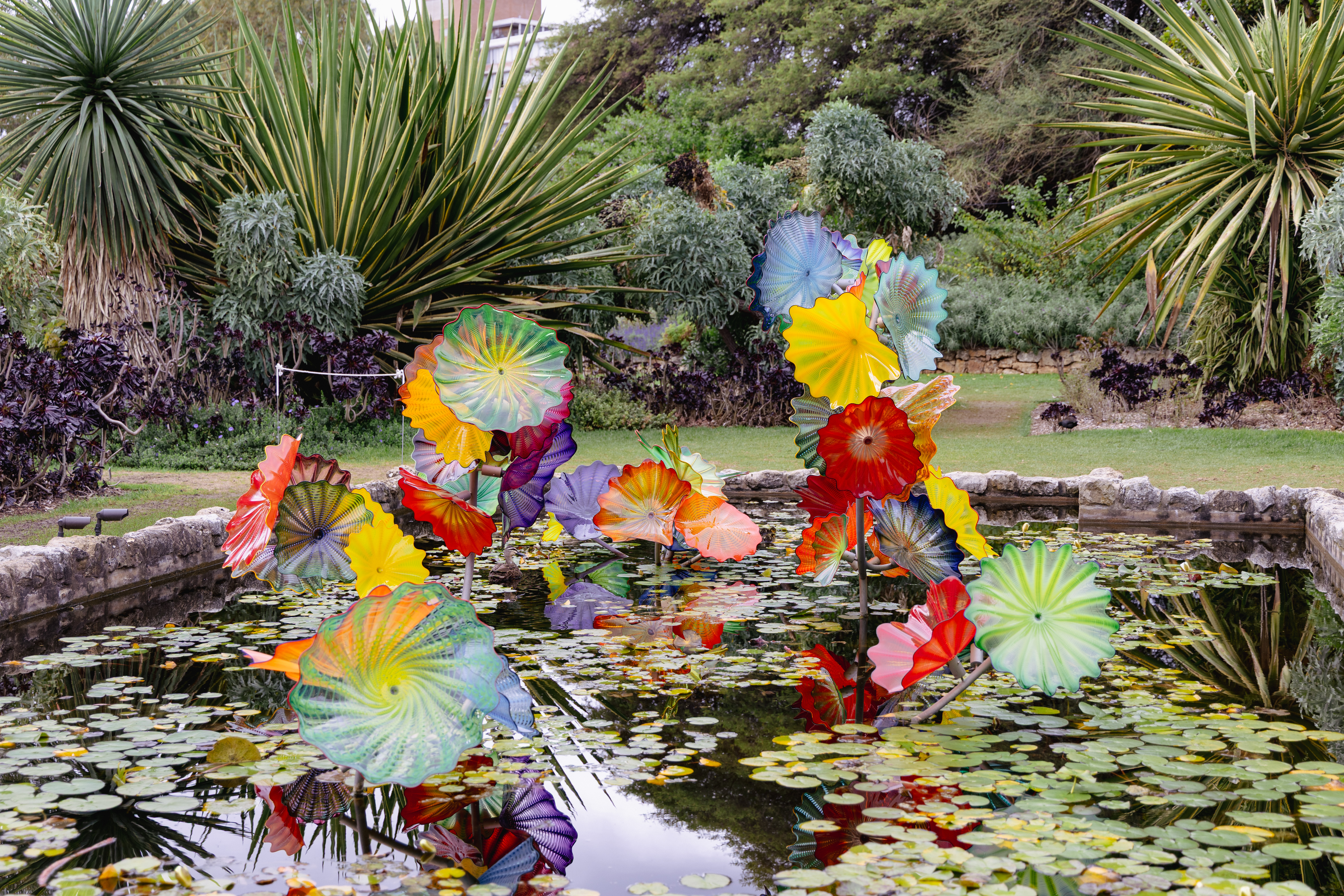
Ethereal Spring Persians (2022)

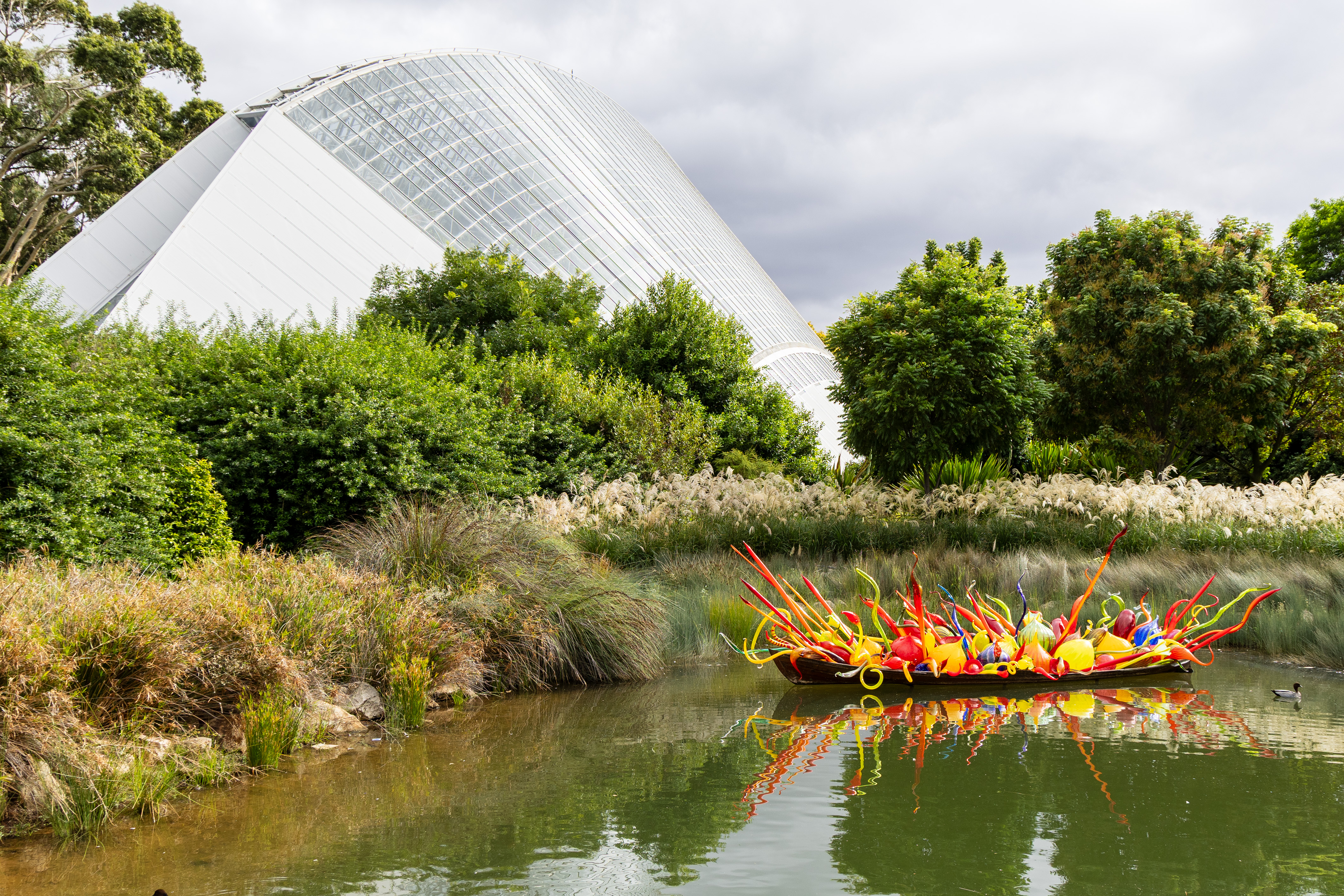
Fiori Boat (2018)

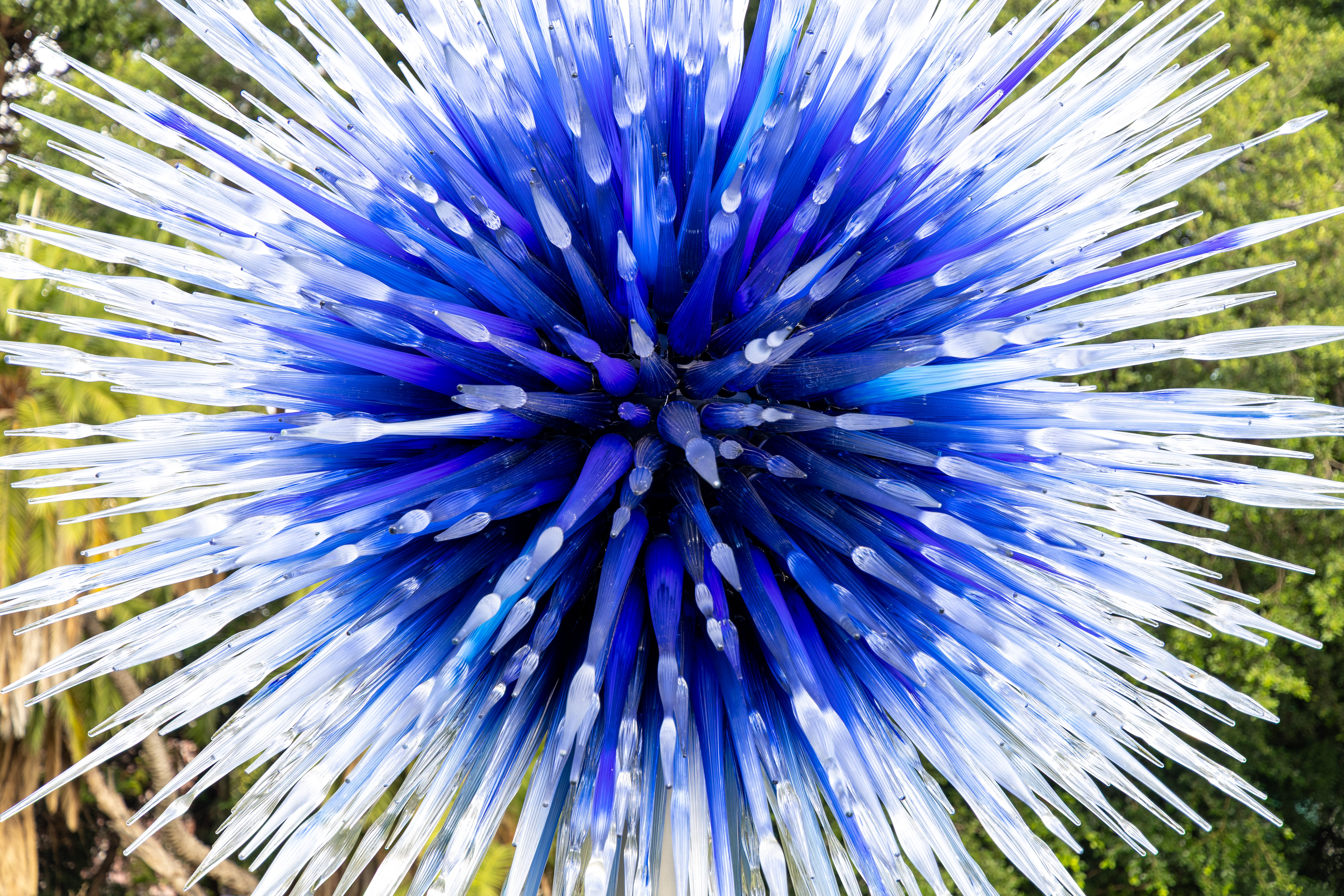
Sapphire Star (2010)

==== Permanent collections ====
Chihuly's art appears in over 400 permanent collections all over the world, including in the United States, Canada, England, Israel, China, Singapore, the United Arab Emirates, and Australia. Chihuly's largest permanent exhibit is at the Oklahoma City Museum of Art. Other large collections can be found at the Morean Arts Center in St. Petersburg, Florida, and Chihuly Garden and Glass in Seattle, Washington. Four large-scale installations are on permanent display at the Baker Museum in Naples, Florida. One large installation is on permanent display in the entry of the Minneapolis Institute of Arts in Minneapolis Minnesota.

=== Recognition ===
- 1994: Golden Plate Award of the American Academy of Achievement
- 2006: American Craft Council's gold medal
- 2011: Fritz Redlich Alumni Award of the Institute of International Education

== Bibliography ==
- Chihuly Over Venice by William Warmus and Dana Self. Seattle: Portland Press, 1996.
- Chihuly by Donald Kuspit. New York: Harry N. Abrams, 1998.
- The Essential Dale Chihuly by William Warmus. New York: Harry N. Abrams, 2000.
- Dale Chihuly:365 Days. Margaret L. Kaplan, Editor. New York: Harry N. Abrams, 2008.
- Chihuly Drawing, illustrated by Chihuly, with an essay by Nathan Kernan. Portland Press, 2003, ISBN 1-57684-019-0
- Warmus, William; Oldknow, Tina (2020). Venice and American Studio Glass. Milan: Skira. ISBN 9788857243870.
