= Doel Reed =

American painter, printmaker (1894–1985)

- Born: May 21, 1894; Logansport, Indiana, U.S.
- Died: September 30, 1985 (aged 91); Taos, New Mexico, U.S.
- Occupations: Painter, printmaker, educator
- Known for: Landscape painting, aquatint
- Spouse: Elizabeth Jane Sparks (m. 1920)
- Children: 1

Doel Reed (May 21, 1894 – September 30, 1985) was an American painter, printmaker, and educator. He served as the head of the art department at Oklahoma State University in Stillwater, Oklahoma. He has been called a master of the printmaking technique aquatint.

== Early life, family, and education ==
Doel Reed was born on May 21, 1894, in Logansport, Indiana. His parents were Anna Anderson, and William Reed. He was raised in Indianapolis.

In his childhood, Reed took classes at the John Herron Art Museum (now Herron School of Art and Design) in Indianapolis. He attended the Art Academy of Cincinnati starting in 1916.

He took a break from his studies to serve in the United States Army during World War I, with the 47th Infantry in France. He was exposed to mustard gas which caused continuing respiratory problems. In 1919, he returned to his education at the Art Academy of Cincinnati.

Reed married his classmate, Elizabeth Jane Sparks on October 21, 1920. Together they had one daughter, Martha Jane Reed.

== Career ==
Reed was a printmaker and painter, known for his landscapes and female figurative works.

He worked at Oklahoma A&M College (now Oklahoma State University) from 1924 to 1959, where Reed founded the art department and served as the department head. He retired as a professor emeritus. After he retired, Reed moved to Taos, New Mexico.

The September 1959 cover of American Artist Magazine featured Reed's artwork.

He was a member for 10 years of the board of regents for the Museum of New Mexico in Santa Fe; and a board member of the Harwood Museum of Art in Taos. Reed was a member of the National Academy of Design, the Oklahoma Art League, and the Audubon Society.

Reed was awarded the 40th Audubon Exhibition Award, and the Louis Lozowick Award (1982). He had an exhibition at the American Cultural Institute in China (1983). Reed was awarded honorary certificates by Mayor of Tulsa James Inhofe, and Governor of Oklahoma George Nigh.

== Death and legacy ==
Reed died at age 91 on September 30, 1985, in Taos, New Mexico. A memorial was held for him at Mission Gallery in Taos. He was survived by his wife and daughter.

His work can be found in museum collections, including at the Smithsonian American Art Museum in Washington, D.C.; the National Gallery of Art in Washington, D.C.; the Dallas Museum of Art; the Spencer Museum of Art in Lawrence, Kansas; the Pennsylvania Academy of the Fine Arts in Philadelphia; the Cincinnati Art Museum; the Memphis Brooks Museum of Art in Memphis, Tennessee; the Blanton Museum of Art in Austin, Texas; the Thomas Gilcrease Institute of American History and Art in Tulsa, Oklahoma; the Art Institute of Chicago; the Nelson-Atkins Museum of Art in Kansas City, Missouri; the Carnegie Museum of Art in Pittsburgh, Pennsylvania; the Wichita Art Museum; the Buffalo AKG Art Museum; the New Mexico Museum of Art in Santa Fe; and the print collection at the New York Public Library Main Branch.

He is the namesake for the Doel Reed Center in Taos, part of Oklahoma State University.

== Exhibitions ==
- 1965, 52nd Annual Allied Artists of America Exhibition, National Academy of Design, New York City, New York
- 1965, 26th Annual Watercolor Exhibition, Birmingham, Alabama; Lamar Dodd served as a juror
- 1983, American Cultural Institute in China
- 1985, Doel Reed Retrospective, solo exhibition, Stables Art Center, Taos, New Mexico
- 2021, Sun Patterns—Dark Canyon: The Paintings and Aquatints of Doel Reed, traveling solo exhibition, Oklahoma State University Museum of Art, Stillwater, Oklahoma; and Wichita Art Museum; curated by Rebecca Brienen

== Publications ==
- Reed, Doel (1965). Doel Reed Makes an Aquatint. Museum of New Mexico.
