= Nellie Ellen Shepherd =

American painter

Nellie Ellen Shepherd (April 30, 1877 – July 18, 1920) was an American painter. She was one of the earliest professional women artists in Oklahoma.

A native of Thayer, Kansas, Shepherd was one of eight children, six daughters and two sons, of George T. and Martha Ellen Shepherd. The family moved to a homestead near Oklahoma City during the Land Rush of 1889. Nellie graduated from high school and enrolled in the Art Academy of Cincinnati, before studying in Paris for three years and working with Henri-Jean Guillaume Martin; her portrait of her sister Lottie was selected for the 1910 Paris Salon, where it won an honorable mention. In 1916 she took lessons at the School of the Art Institute of Chicago and at the Kansas City Art Institute. In 1917 she was named to head the art department of the Oklahoma College for Women, and in 1918 she was elected president of the Oklahoma Art Association; she also gave private instruction, and was a founder member of the Oklahoma Art League, dating to her sojourn in France. Shepherd suffered from poor health for some years, and after sojourns in Colorado and Arizona she died in Tucson of tuberculosis.

Shepherd's style has been described as Impressionistic; she worked primarily in oils, and produced mainly portraits. During her career she showed work in Kansas City, Chicago, and Denver. Her portrait of Te Ata Fisher hangs in the Oklahoma State Capitol, and other work is in the collection of the Oklahoma City Museum of Art. Shepherd's sisters Nettie and Leona were also active as artists; work by the trio was the subject of an auction in Oklahoma City in 2009. The original family homestead in Oklahoma City is today part of the Shepherd Historic District, listed on the National Register of Historic Places in 1997.
