= Nan Sheets =

American journalist

Nannine Jane "Nan" Quick Sheets (December 9, 1885 – September 1976) was an American painter, printmaker, and museum director. It has been said that she, along with Oscar Jacobsen, created the artistic community in central Oklahoma.

== Biography ==
Born in Albany, Illinois, Sheets graduated in 1905 from the School of Pharmacy at Valparaiso University. She then moved to Salt Lake City, working as a prescription clerk while studying art in her free time. In 1910, she married Fred C. Sheets, a physician who had formerly been a classmate, and moved with him to Oklahoma, living in Bartlesville and Muskogee before settling in Oklahoma City in 1916. She began taking summer classes with John F. Carlson at the Broadmoor Academy of Fine Arts in Colorado Springs in 1919, earning a special prize in landscape. Other teachers over her career included Hugh Breckenridge, Kathryn E. Cherry, Nellie Knopf, Robert Lewis Reid, Birger Sandzen, Abbott Handerson Thayer, and Everett Warner.

Sheets turned her home in Oklahoma City, "The Elms", into a salon for local and visiting artists. Every summer she traveled and painted, offering her work for sale upon her return. Her art began to be seen in local museums, such as the Dallas Museum of Art, the Witte Museum and the Fort Worth Art Museum; in 1923 she was included in Who's Who in American Art, and invited to join the National Association of Women Painters and Sculptors. In 1930 she converted her home into a commercial gallery, the first such space in Oklahoma City. She was invited to become co-manager of Oklahoma's earliest New Deal project, and eighteen months later began directing the Oklahoma Art Center of the Works Progress Administration. At the dawn of World War II she and other supporters turned the Center into a museum, and for the rest of her career she remained closely aligned with the institution, for some time serving as its only paid staff member. She served as its director for over fifty years.

Among other pursuits, Sheets wrote on art for the Daily Oklahoman from 1932 to 1962; she also wrote an art column for The Oklahoma Woman magazine. She retired from the Center in 1965, dying eleven years later.

Other organizations to which Sheets belonged include the Oklahoma Art Association, the Oklahoma Art League of Oklahoma City, the MacDowell Colony, the North Shore Art Association, the Southern States Art League, and the American Federation of Arts. In 1955 she was inducted into the Royal Academy of Art. Many of her works take as their subject the American West. One of her paintings is in the collection of the Oklahoma State Capitol. An oral history interview is held by the Archives of American Art at the Smithsonian Institution; it was conducted as part of the Archives' New Deal and the Arts project. Today JRB Art at the Elms Gallery is part of the Paseo Arts District. Sheets was inducted into the Oklahoma Hall of Fame in 1953.
