= Henri-Jean Guillaume Martin =

French painter

Henri Martin
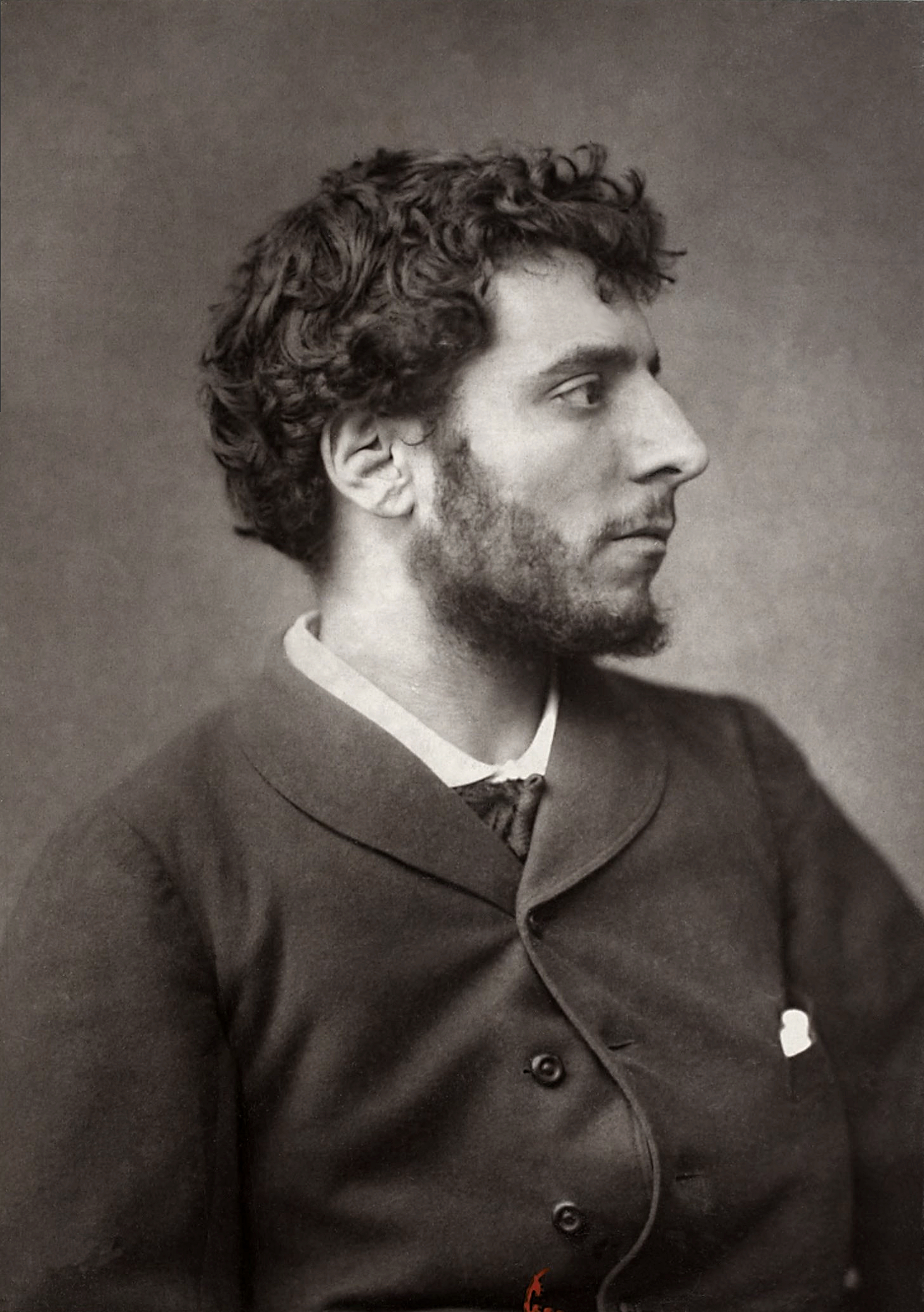
- Martin in 1882
- Born: Henri Jean Guillaume Martin; 5 August 1860; Toulouse, France
- Died: November 12, 1943 (aged 83); Labastide-du-Vert, France
- Occupation: Painter
- Movement: Post-Impressionism
- Spouse: Marie-Charlotte Barbaroux

Henri-Jean Guillaume "Henri" Martin (French pronunciation: [ɑ̃ʁi ʒɑ̃ ɡijom maʁtɛ̃]; 5 August 1860 – 12 November 1943) was a French painter. Elected to the Académie des Beaux-Arts in 1917, he has been described as a prolific master whose work has touches of melancholy, dreaminess and mystery.

Martin is known for his early 1920s work on the walls of the Salle de l'Assemblée générale, where the members of the Conseil d'État meet in the Palais-Royal in Paris. Other notable institutions that have featured his Post-Impressionist paintings in their halls through public procurement include the Élysée Palace, Sorbonne, Hôtel de Ville de Paris, Palais de Justice de Paris and Capitole de Toulouse. The Musée des Beaux-Arts de Bordeaux and Musée des Augustins also have sizeable public collections.

== Life and career ==
=== Early years ===
Born at 127 Grande-Rue Saint-Michel in Toulouse to a French cabinet maker and a mother of Italian descent, Martin successfully persuaded his father to permit him to become an artist. He began his career in 1877 at the Toulouse School of the Fine Arts, where he was under the tutelage of Jules Garipuy; he was also a pupil of Henry-Eugène Delacroix. During his time at the School of Fine Arts, he met Marie-Charlotte Barbaroux, whom he married in 1881. In 1879, Martin relocated to Paris and with the help of a municipal scholarship, was able to study in Jean-Paul Laurens's studio. Four years later, he received his first medal at the Paris Salon, where he would hold his first exhibition three years later in 1886.

=== Visit to Italy and return to France ===
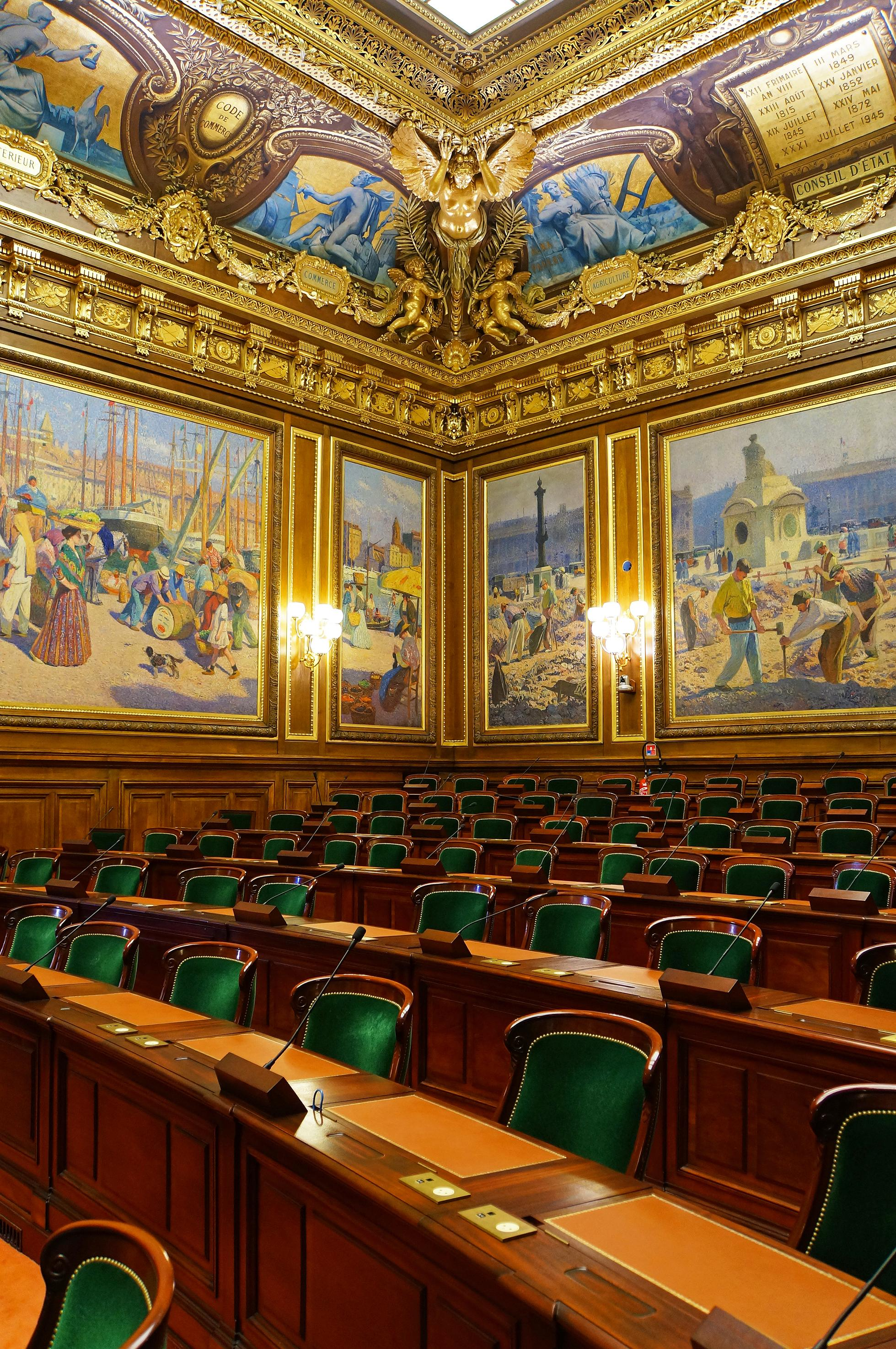
Salle de l'Assemblée générale, Conseil d'État, Paris, with paintings by Martin on the walls

The year after he won his first medal, Martin was awarded a scholarship for a tour in Italy, where he studied the work of veterans such as Giotto and Masaccio alongside Edmond Aman-Jean and Ernest Laurent. His 1889 canvas submission to the Salon earned him the gold medal for work that has been described as Pointillist. In 1896 he was made a knight of the Legion of Honour, before being promoted to the rank of officer in 1905 and commander in 1914. At the 1900 World Fair, he was awarded the Grand Prize for his work. During this period, he became friends with Auguste Rodin.

Although Martin's work as a Neo-Impressionist is not considered groundbreaking, it was rather well-received; it has been associated with world-class symbolist painter Puvis de Chavannes. After joining the Société nouvelle de peintres et de sculpteurs in Paris in 1899, he was elected to the Académie des Beaux-Arts (painting section) in 1917.

=== Late years ===
Due to his introverted temperament, Martin decided to move away from Paris. After a decade of searching for an ideal home, Martin bought the Domaine de Marquayrol, overlooking the village of Labastide-du-Vert, near Cahors. He performed what is considered by some his best work in the new tranquil environment. He died there in 1943. In a 2020 portrait by Le Monde, Raphaëlle Rérolle writes about Martin painting at Labastide-du-Vert: "The elders of this Lot village say that when [the children] left class, [they] were not allowed to stop near him. Better to go straight ahead, not forgetting to greet politely, otherwise the artist would complain to the schoolmistress". Two of his four sons became painters: Claude-René Martin and Jacques Martin-Ferrières. Henri Martin was also a teacher who had among his pupils American painter Nellie Ellen Shepherd. The Musée de Cahors Henri-Martin in Cahors, which was named after him, exposes some of his work.

== Gallery ==
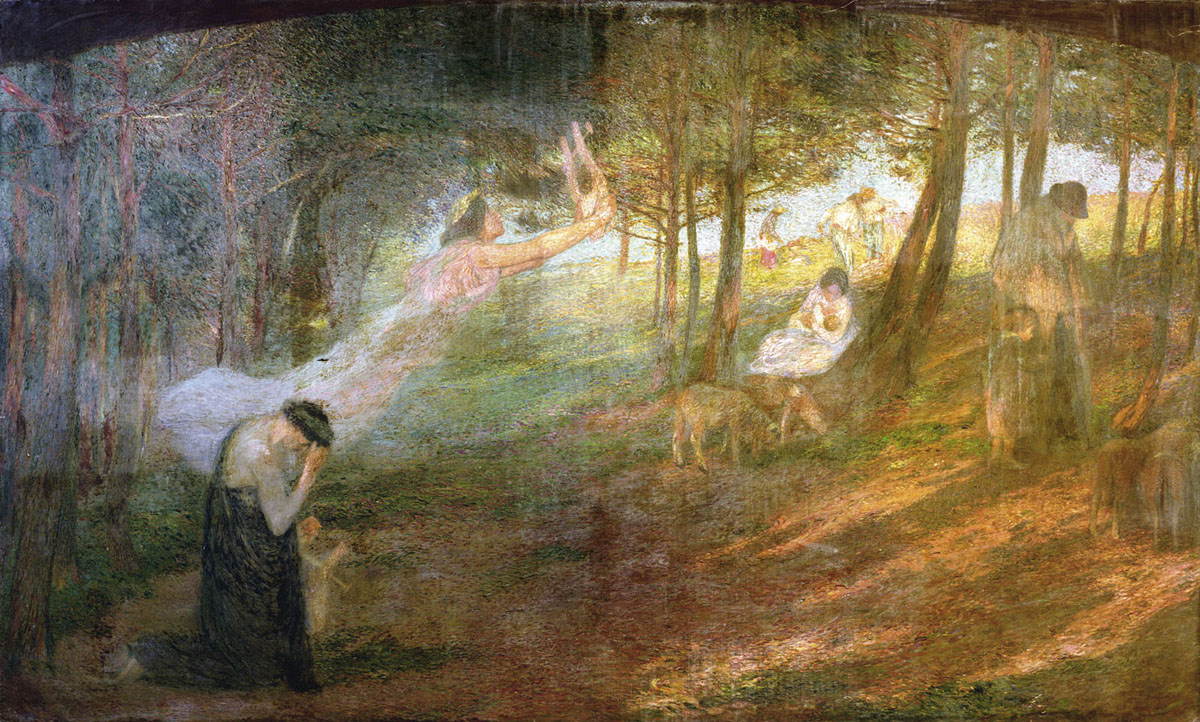
Le Poète (The Poet), 1881, Musée des Augustins

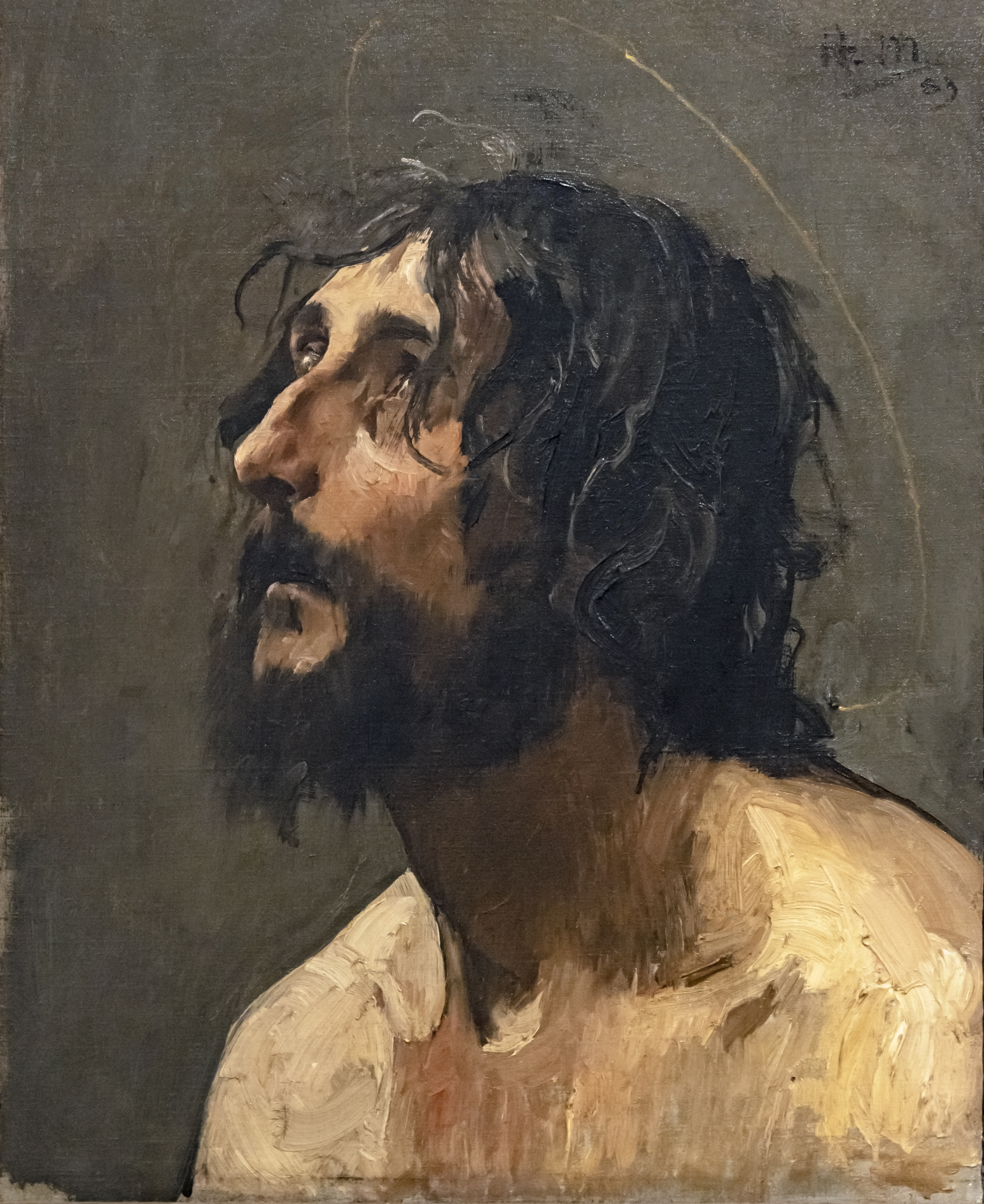
Autoportrait en saint Jean-Baptiste (Self-portrait in Saint John the Baptist), 1883, Musée des Beaux-Arts de Carcassonne

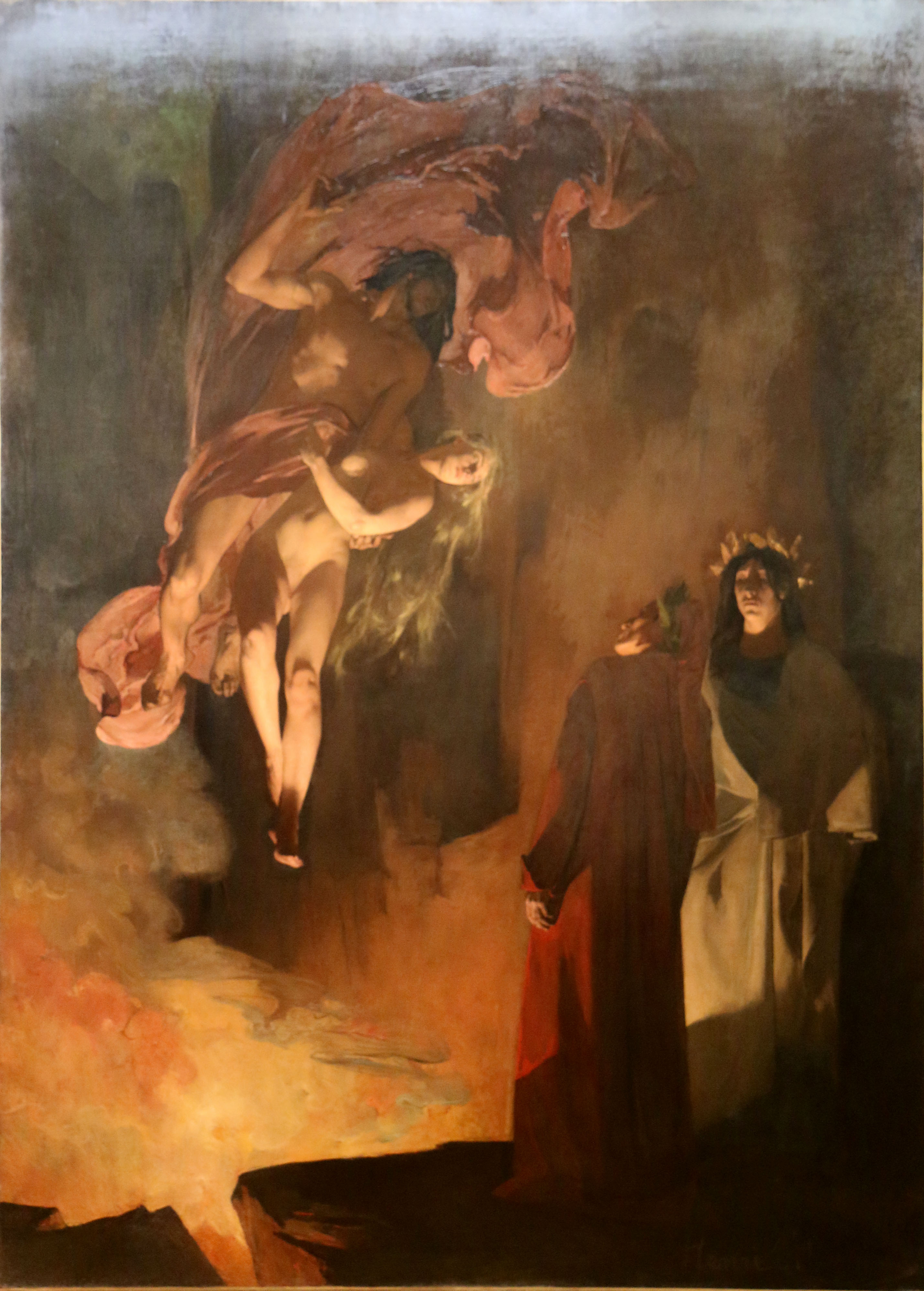
Paolo Malatesta et Francesca da Rimini aux enfers (Paolo Malatesta and Francesca da Rimini in hell), 1883, Musée des Beaux-Arts de Carcassonne

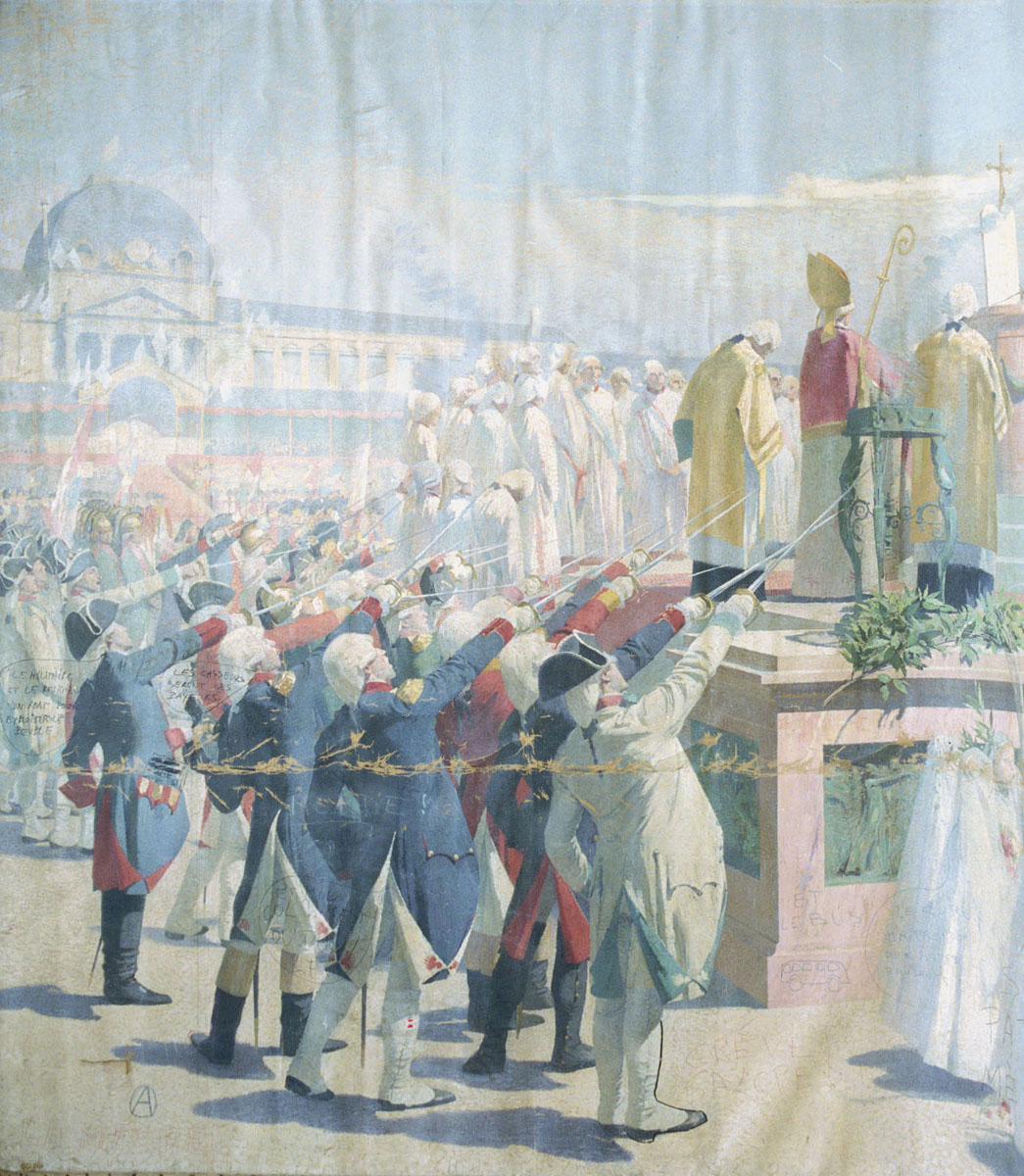
La Fête de la Fédération au Champ de Mars le 14 juillet 1790 (The Fête de la Fédération at Champ de Mars on 14 July 1790), 1889, Musée des Augustins

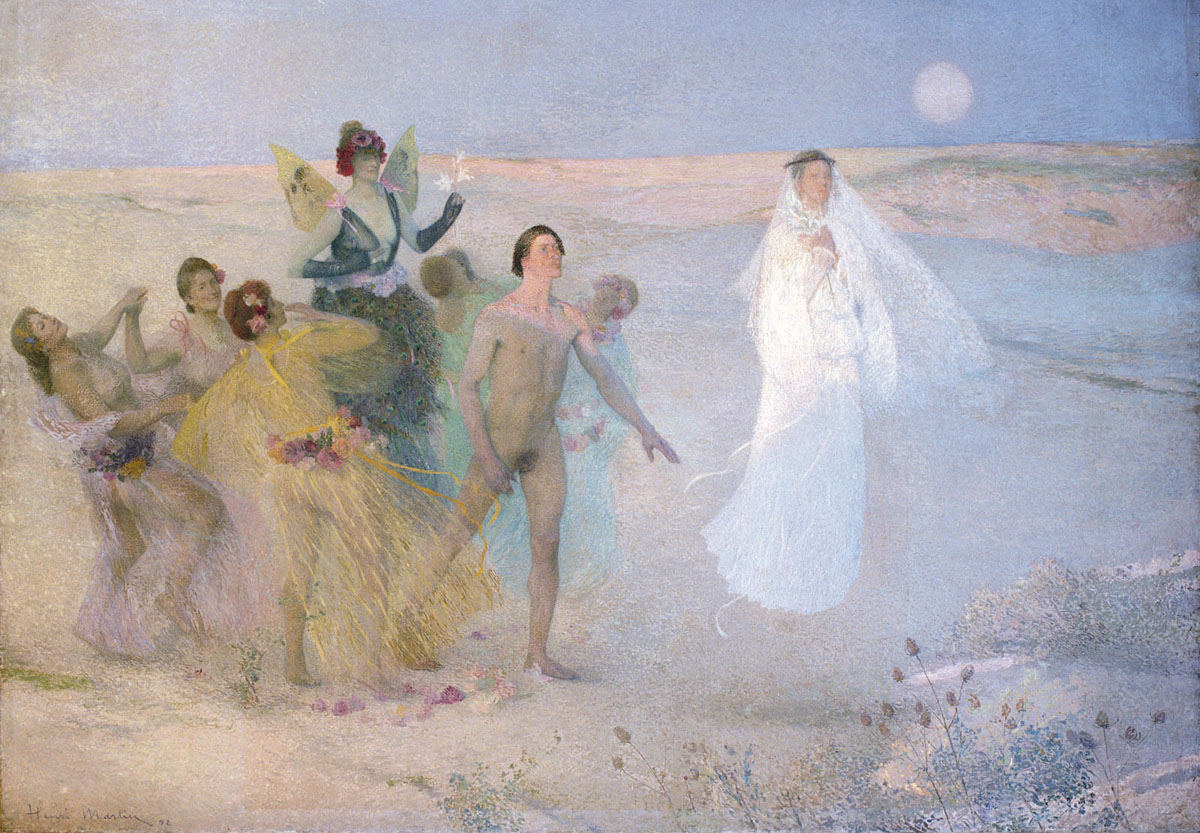
L'Homme entre le Vice et la Vertu (Man Between Vice and Virtue), 1892, Musée des Augustins

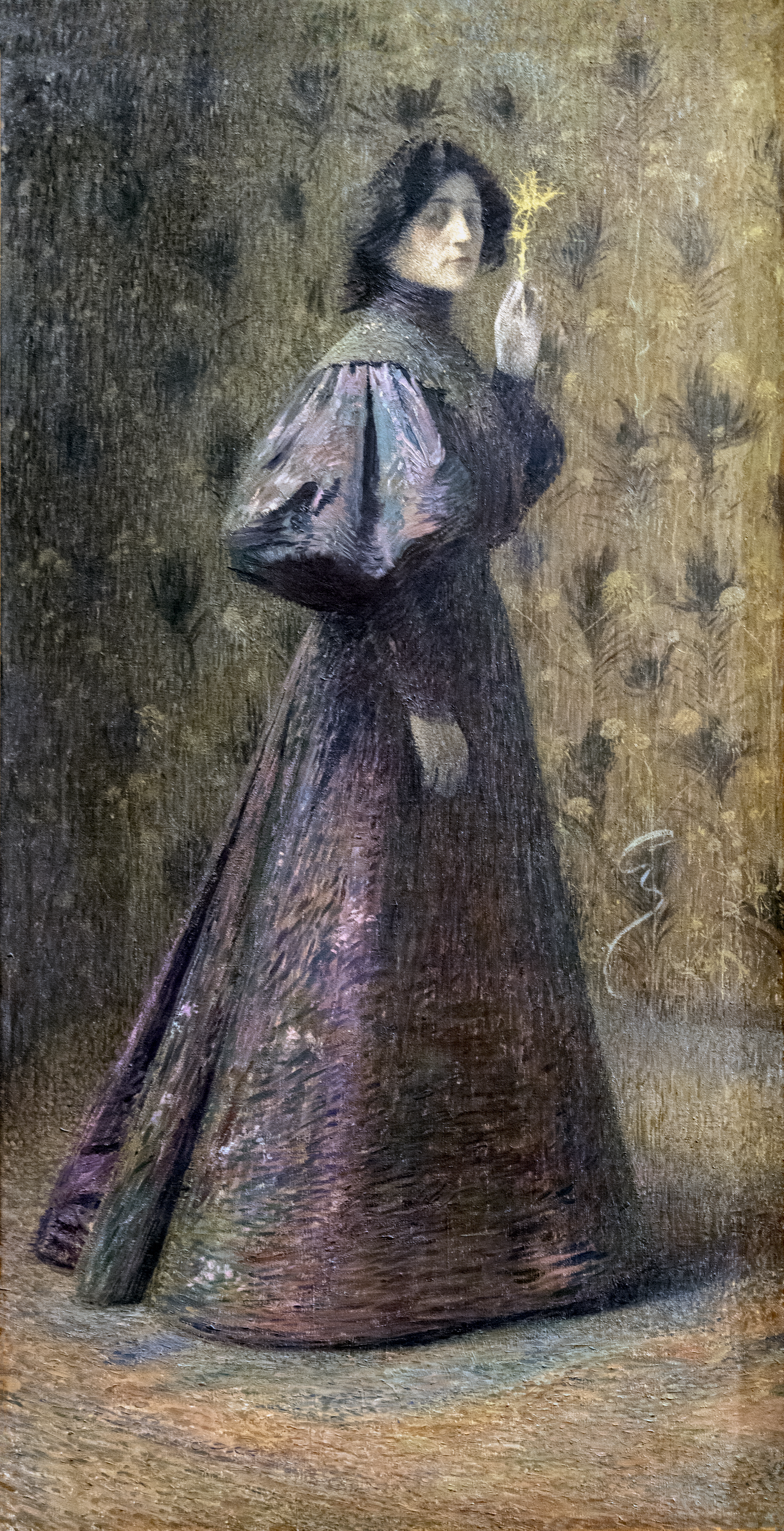
Portrait de Madame Sans (Portrait of Madam Sans), 1895, Musée des Augustins

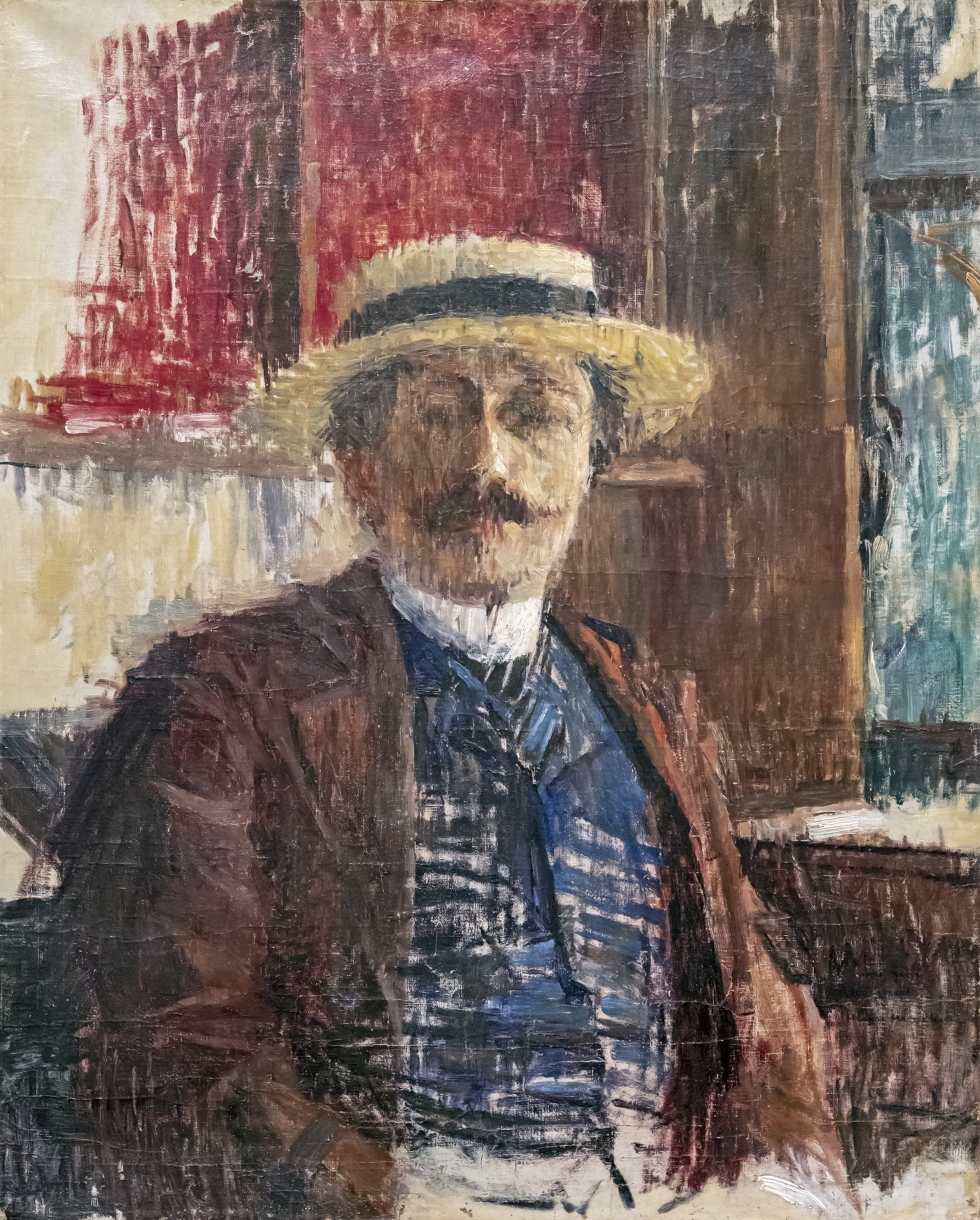
Portrait d'Albert Sarraut (Portrait of Albert Sarraut), c. 1898, Musée des Beaux-Arts de Carcassonne

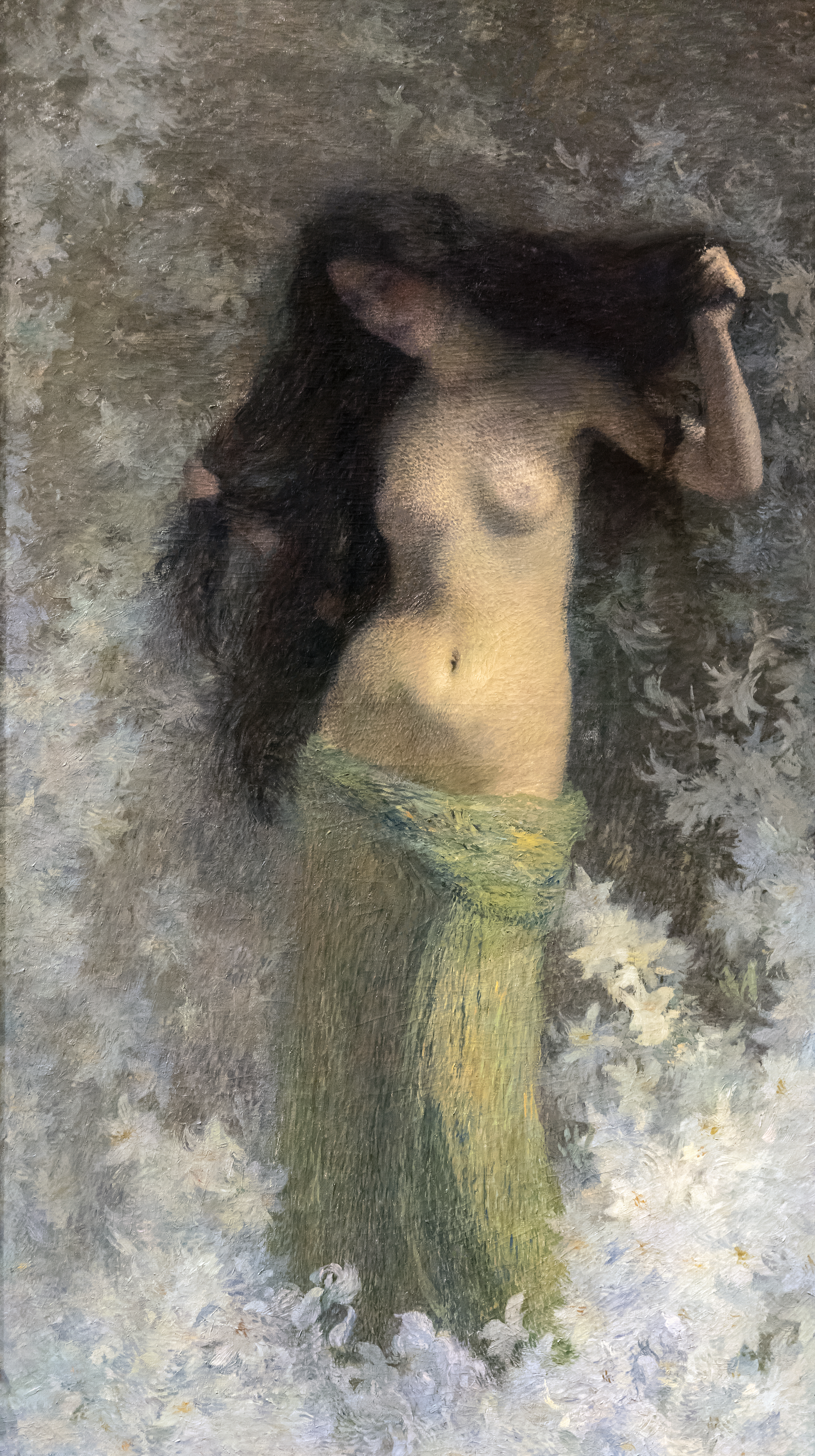
Beauté (Beauty), 1900, Musée des Augustins

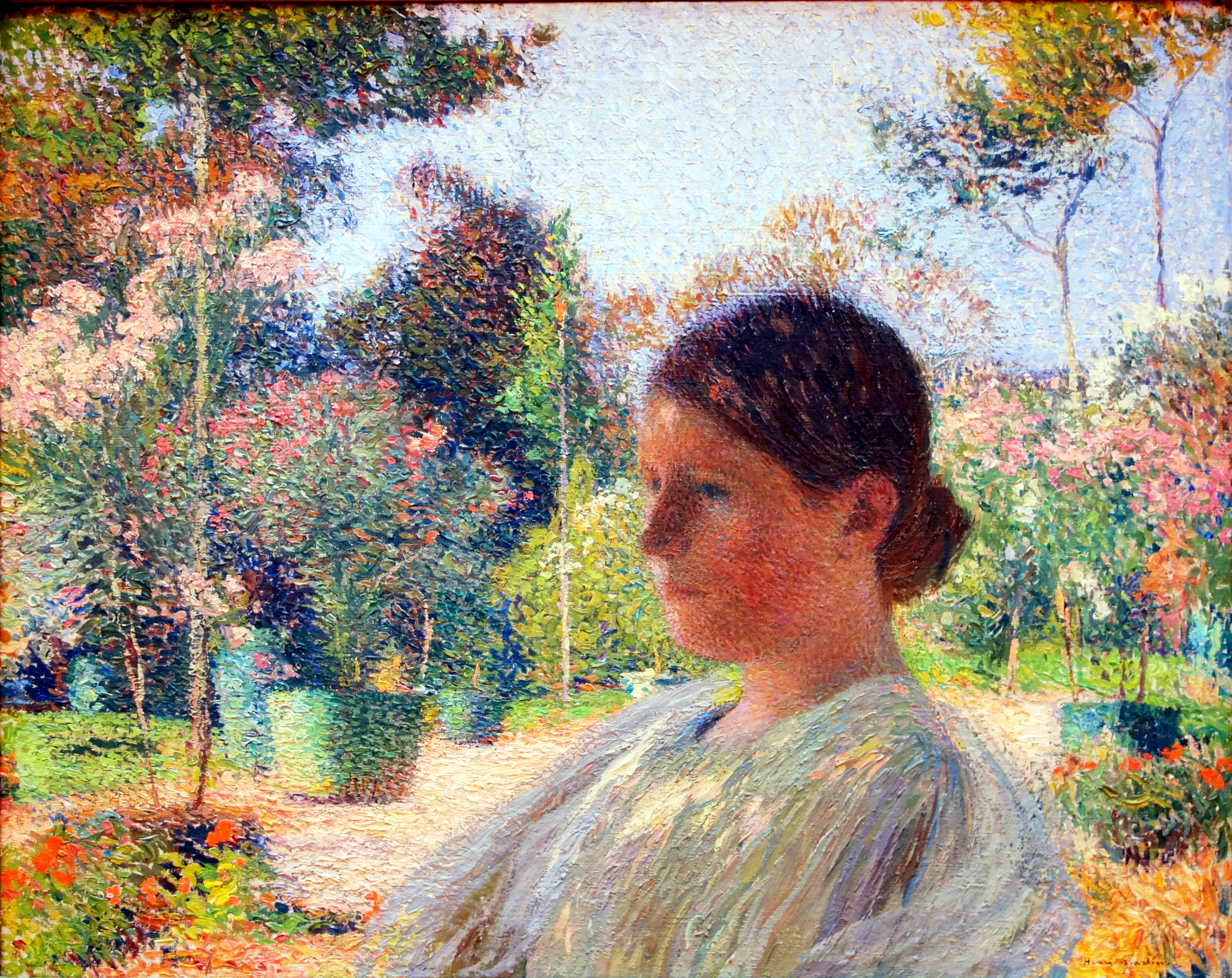
Dans le jardin (In the garden), c. 1900, Palais des Beaux-Arts de Lille

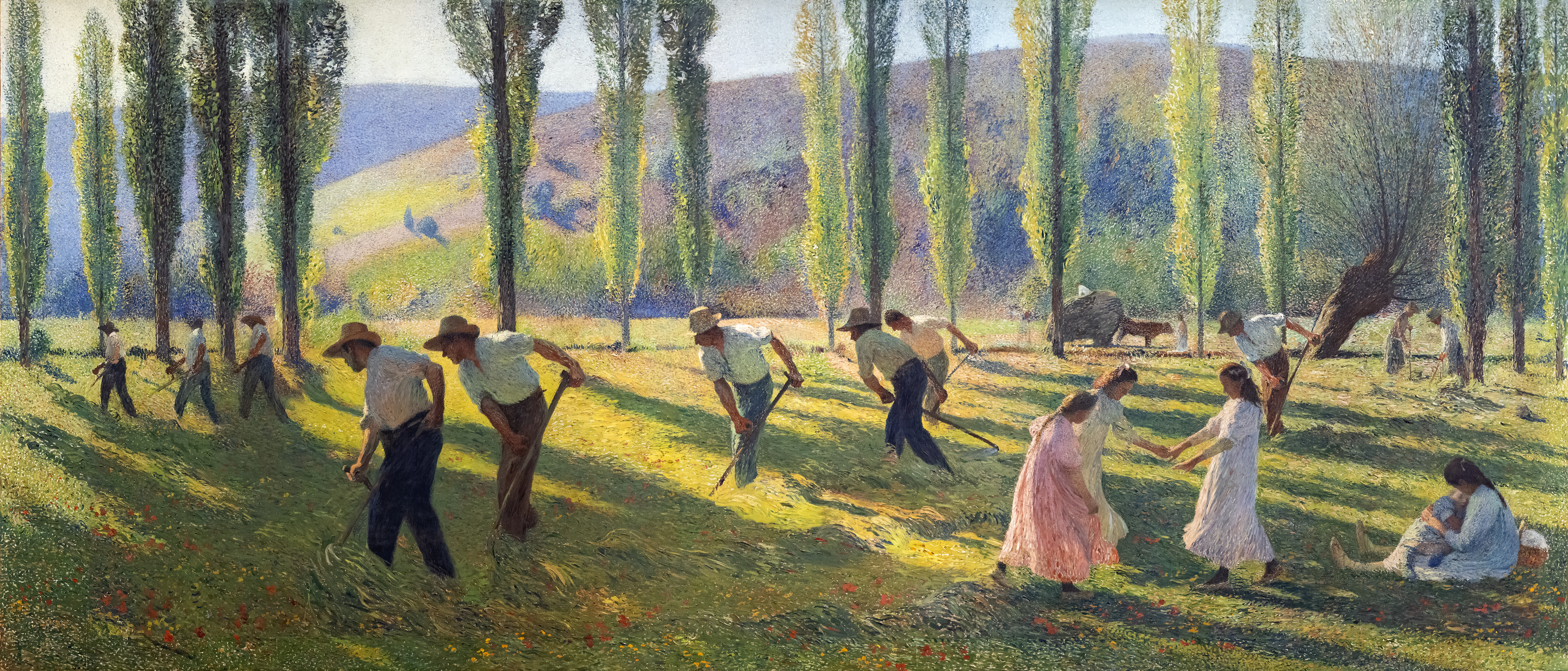
L'été ou les faucheurs (Summer or mowers), 1903, Capitole de Toulouse

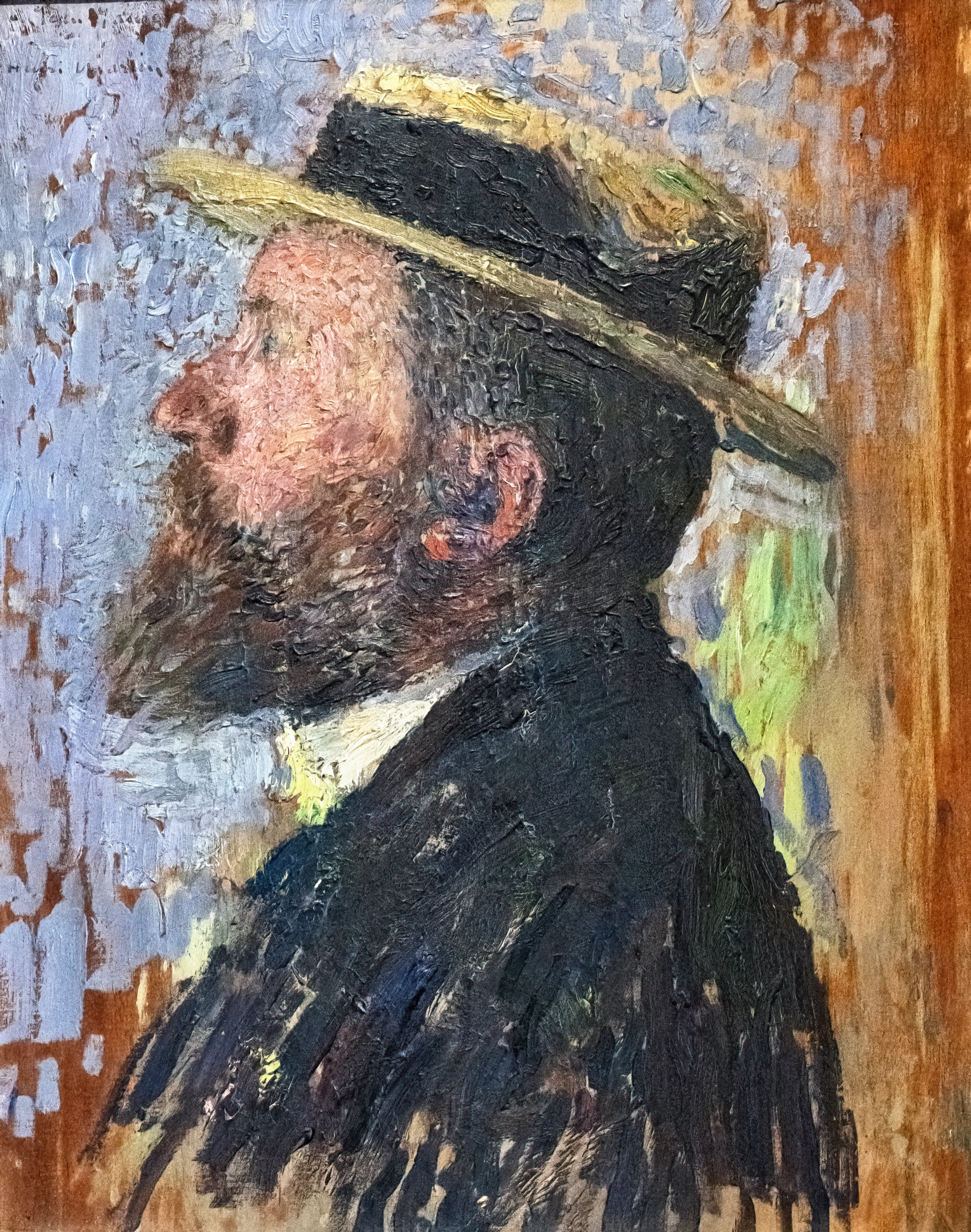
Portrait de Jean Jaurès (Portrait of Jean Jaurès), 1905, Musée Toulouse-Lautrec

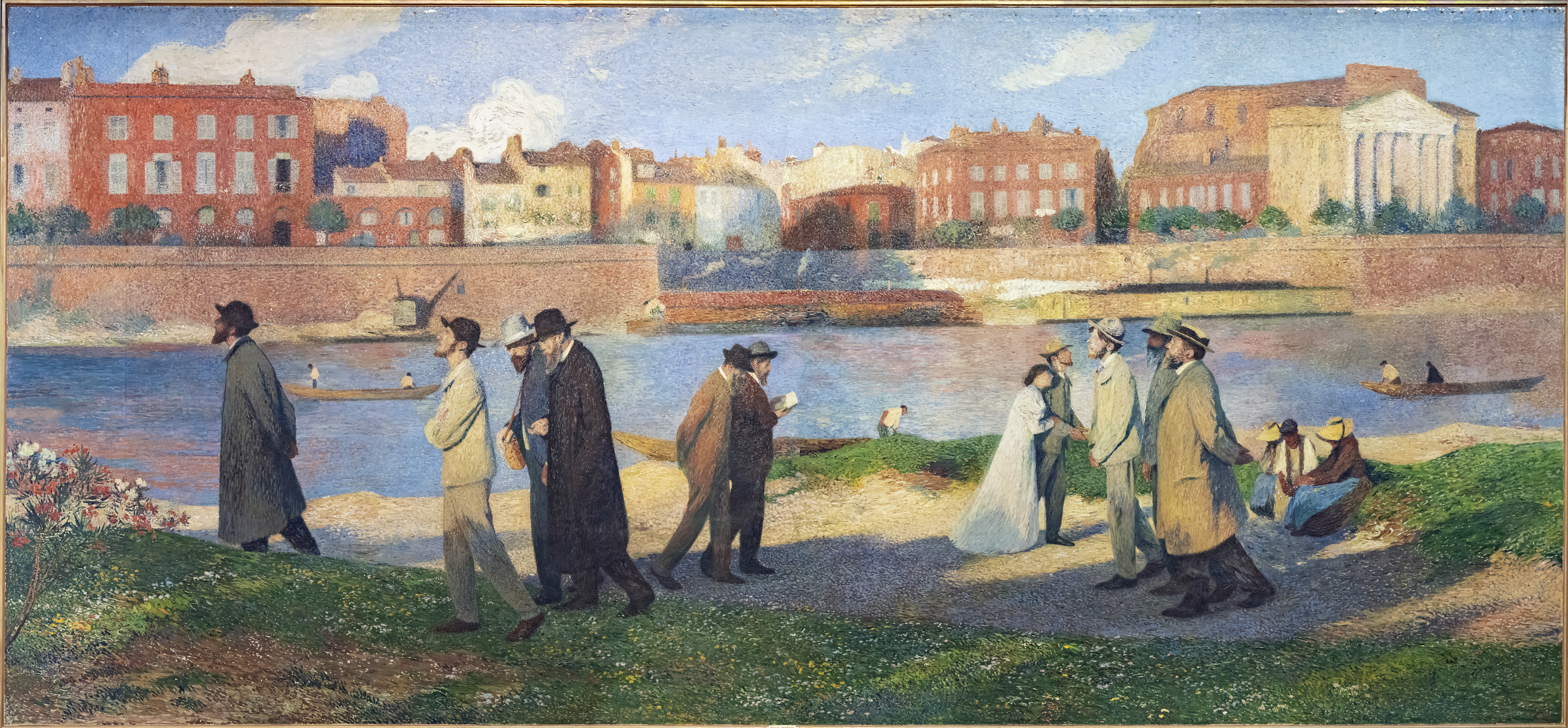
Les bords de la Garonne, les promeneurs ou les rêveurs (The banks of the Garonne, walkers or dreamers), 1906, Capitole de Toulouse

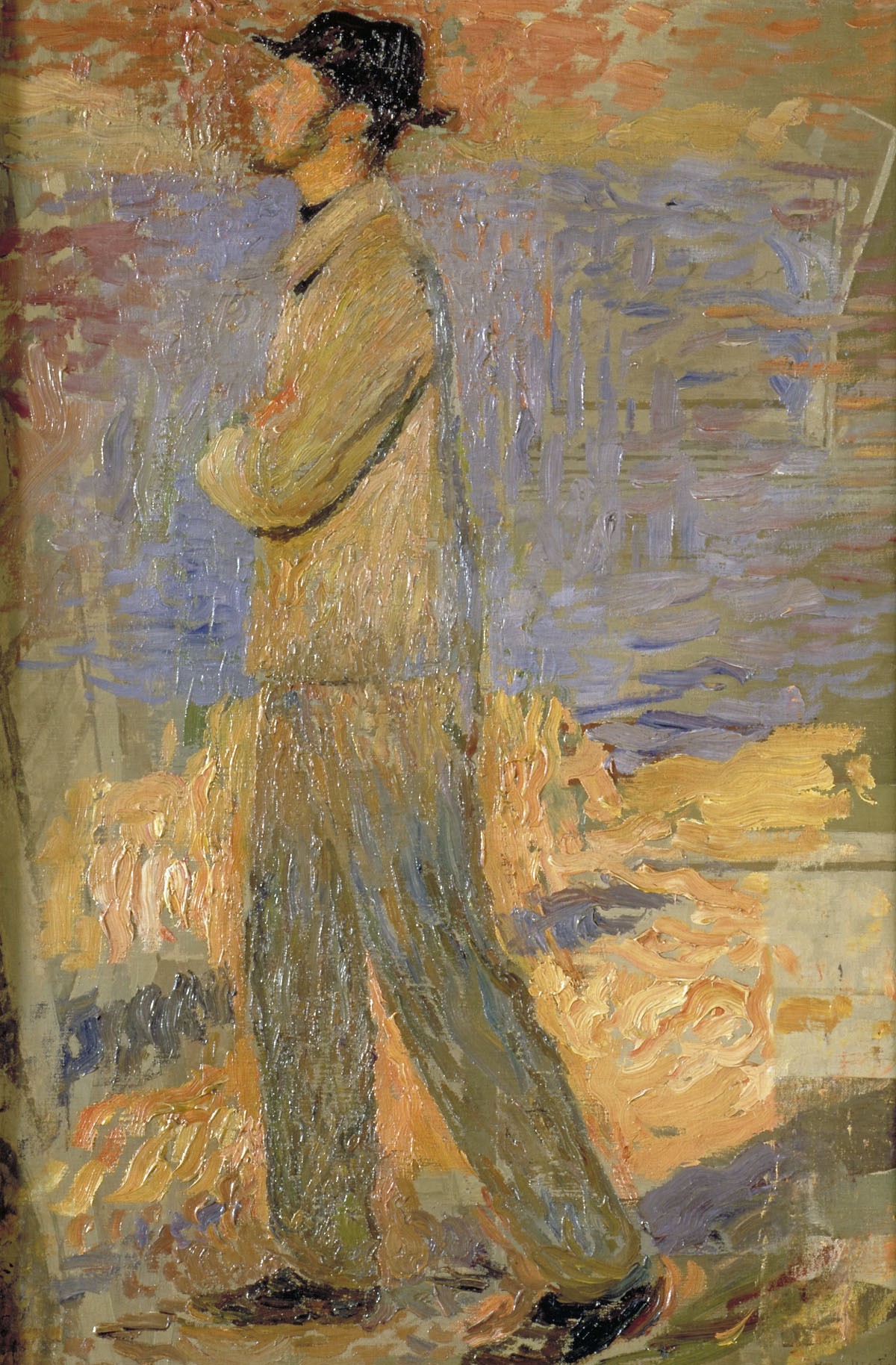
Étude pour les bords de la Garonne (Study for the banks of the Garonne), c. 1906, Musée des Augustins

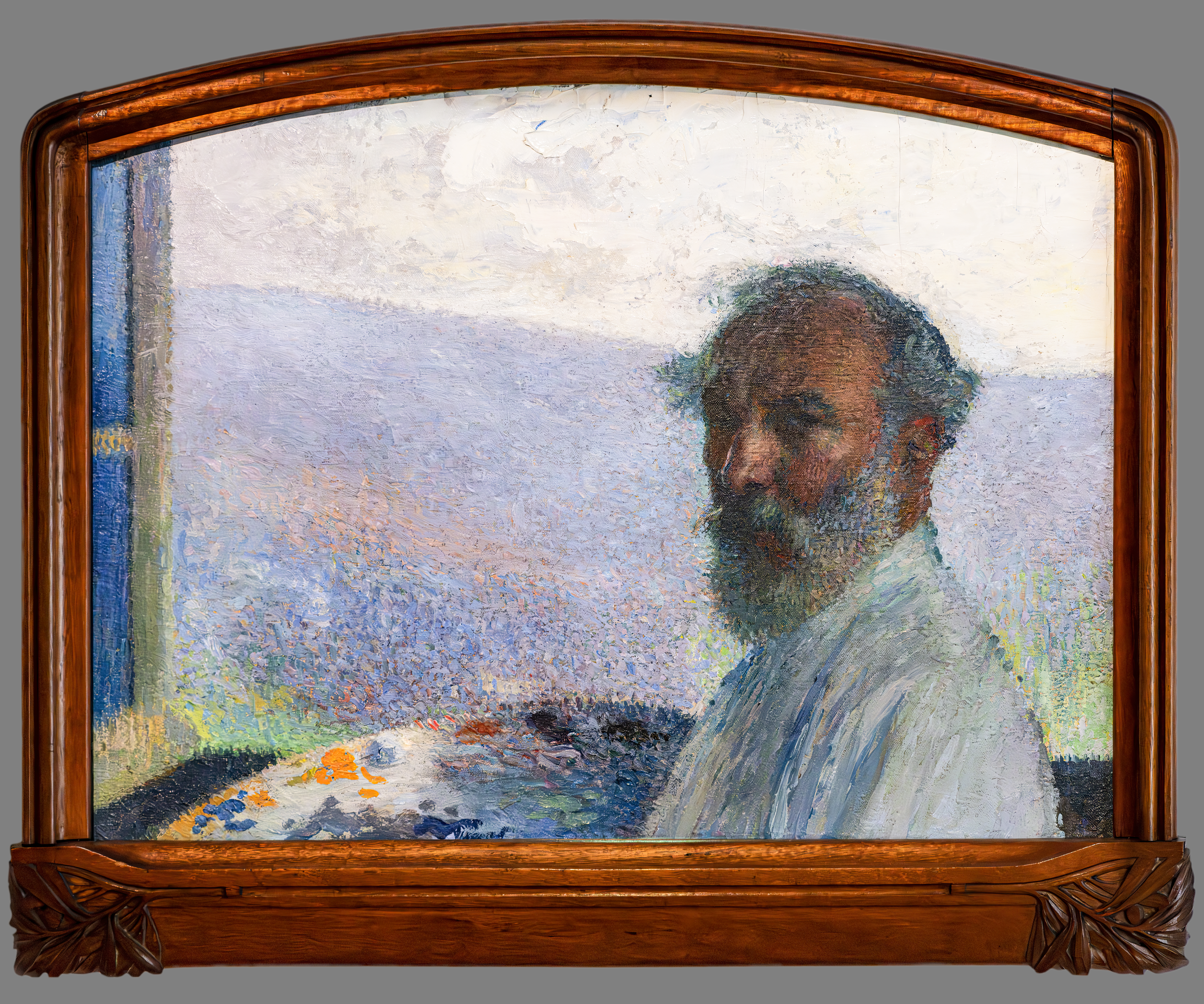
Portrait de l'artiste (Self-portrait), c. 1912, Musée d'Orsay

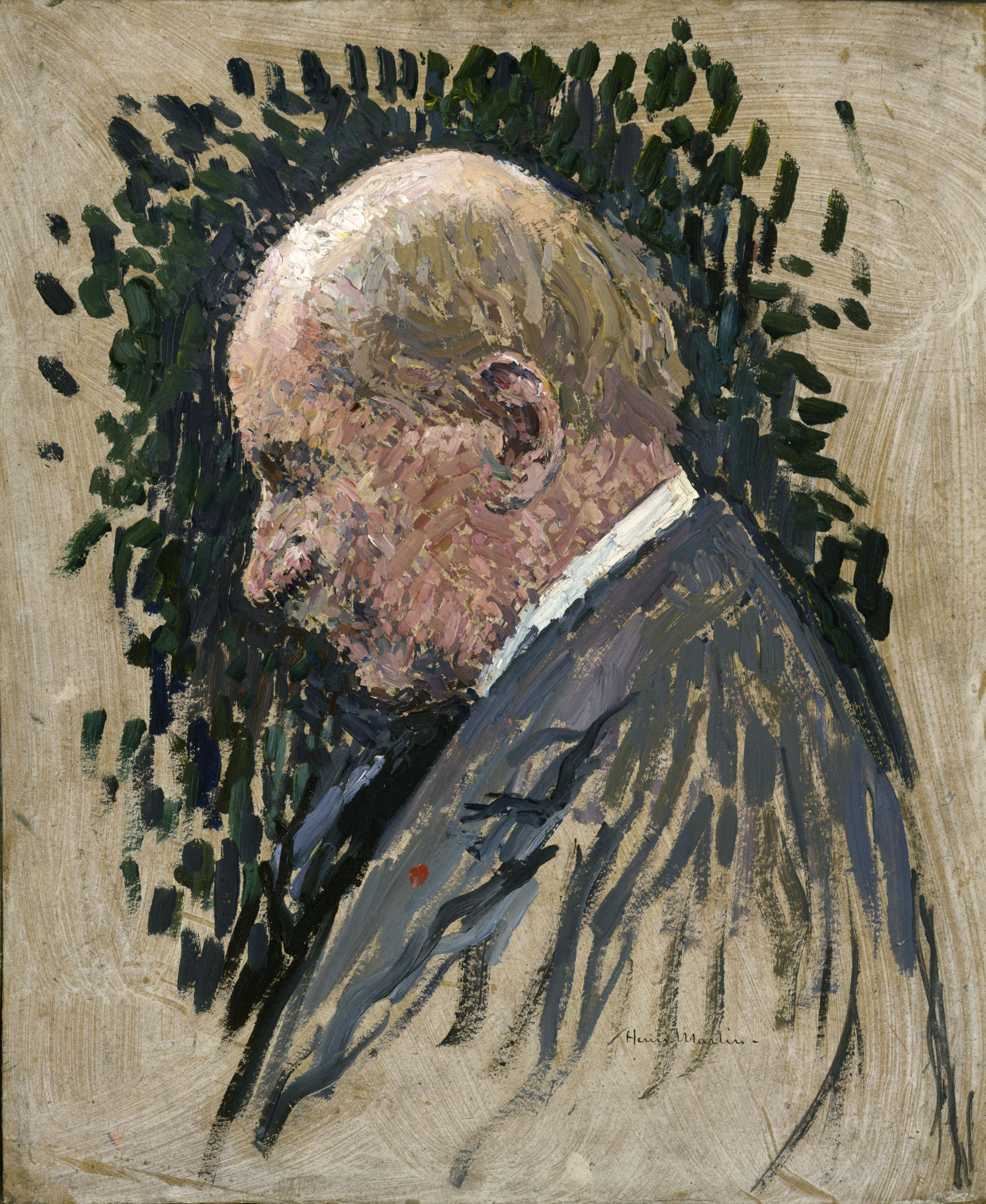
Gustave Charpentier (1860–1956), compositeur (Gustave Charpentier (1860–1956), composer), c. 1932, Musée Carnavalet

== See also ==
- Hôtel Terminus
