= Jules Garipuy =

French painter

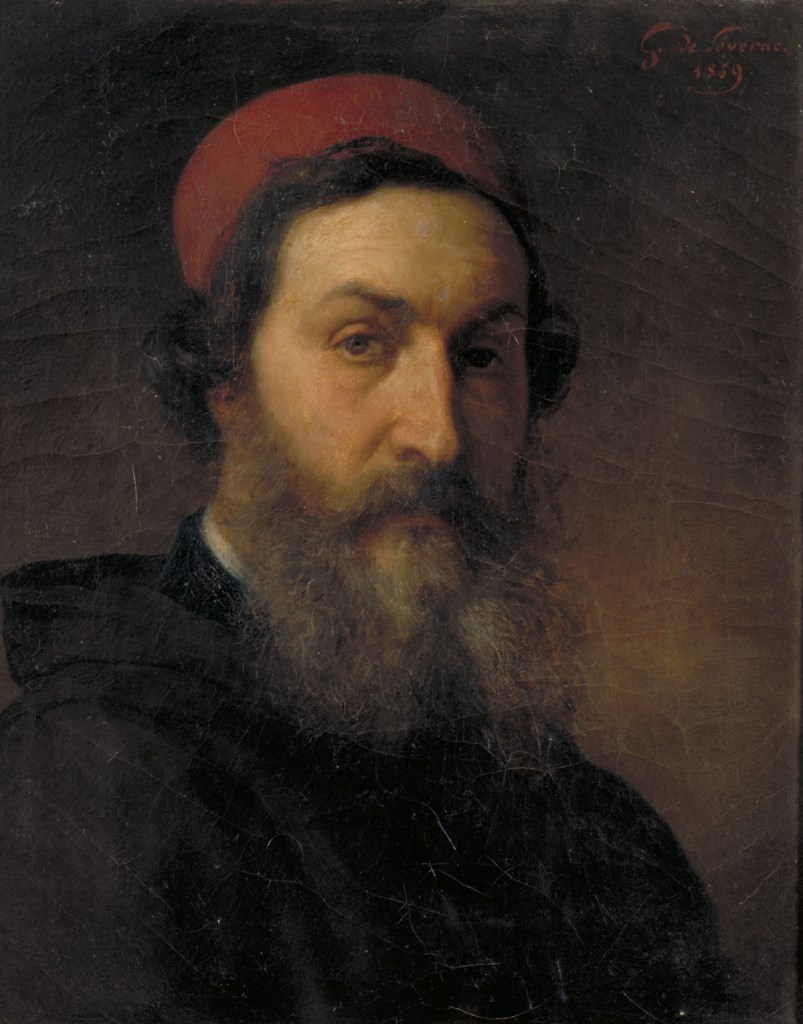
Jules Garipuy - Gilbert de Séverac (1859)

Jules Joseph Garipuy (1817–1893) was the Director at the Toulouse Museum and a Beaux-Arts Academy professor who taught several renowned artists, including Jean-Paul Laurens, André Rixens, Edouard Debat-Ponsan, Jean Joseph Benjamin Constant, Henri Martin and Henri Rachou.

JJ Garipuy is known to have studied under the painter Eugène Delacroix. Gairpuy became director of the beaux-arts in 1885.

The painter Benjamin-Constant studied under Jules Garipuy.
