= Albany, Illinois =

- Village
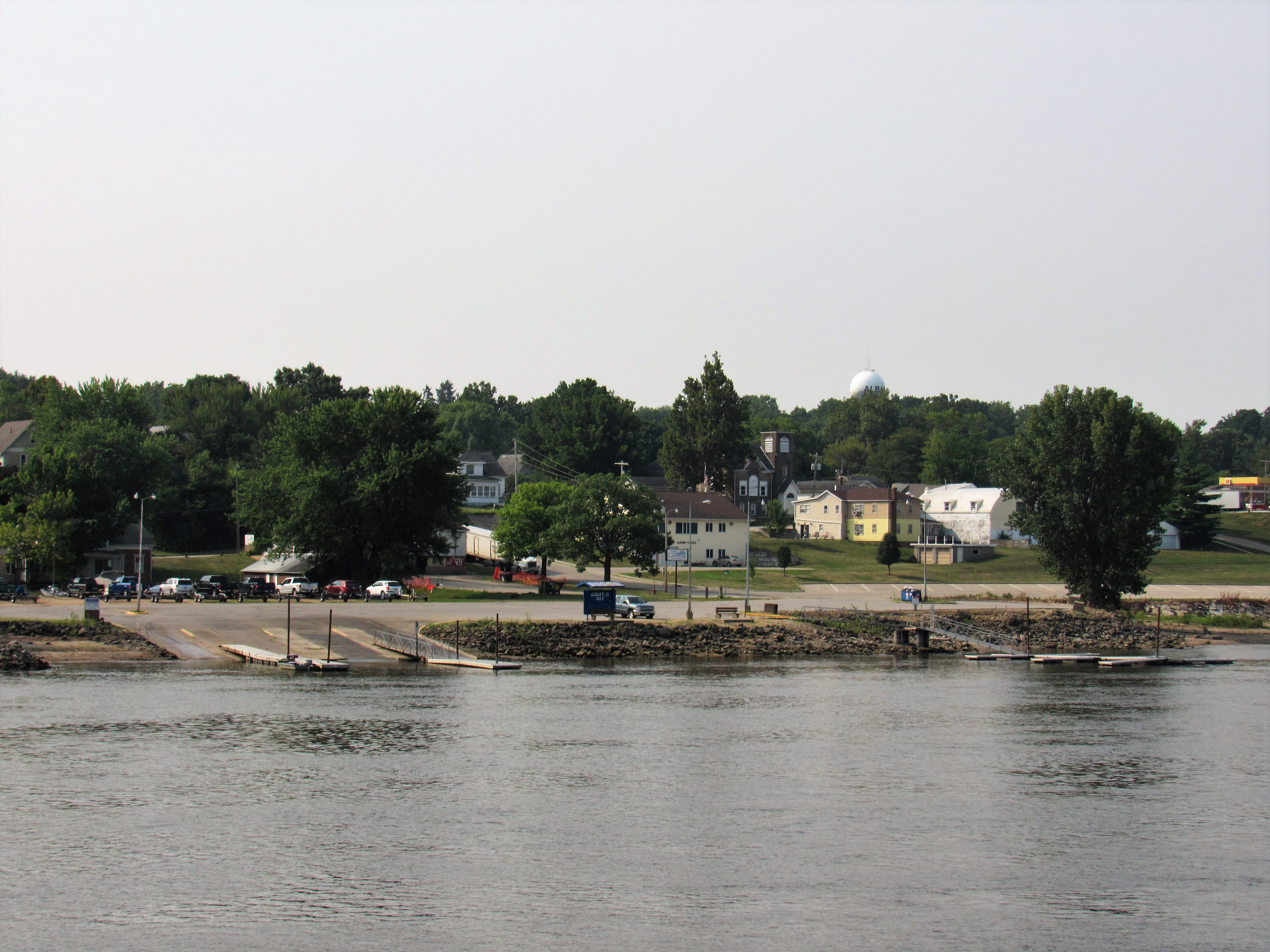
- Albany from the Mississippi River
- Interactive map of Albany, Illinois
- Location in Illinois Albany, Illinois (the United States) Albany, Illinois (North America)
- Coordinates: 41°47′10″N 90°12′59″W
- Country: United States
- State: Illinois
- County: Whiteside

Area
  - Total: 1.07 sq mi (2.77 km^{2})
  - Land: 1.07 sq mi (2.77 km^{2})
  - Water: 0 sq mi (0.00 km^{2})
- Elevation: 656 ft (200 m)

Population (2020)
  - Total: 864
  - Density: 806.7/sq mi (311.45/km^{2})
- Time zone: UTC-6 (CST)
  - Summer (DST): UTC-5 (CDT)
- ZIP code: 61230
- Area code: 309
- FIPS code: 17-00516
- GNIS feature ID: 2397923

Albany is a village in Whiteside County, Illinois, United States. As of the 2020 census, Albany had a population of 864.

== History ==
Albany was laid out in 1837, and named after Albany, New York, the native home of a large share of the first settlers. A post office called Albany has been in operation since 1838.

== Geography ==
According to the 2010 census, Albany has a total area of 1.07 square miles (2.77 km^{2}), all land.

== Demographics ==
Historical population
Census	Pop.	Note	%±
1860	628		—
1870	606		−3.5%
1880	623		2.8%
1890	611		−1.9%
1900	629		2.9%
1910	618		−1.7%
1920	491		−20.6%
1930	450		−8.4%
1940	492		9.3%
1950	544		10.6%
1960	637		17.1%
1970	942		47.9%
1980	1,014		7.6%
1990	835		−17.7%
2000	895		7.2%
2010	891		−0.4%
2020	864		−3.0%
U.S. Decennial Census

As of the census of 2000, there were 895 people, 349 households, and 262 families residing in the village. The population density was 894.8 inhabitants per square mile (345.5/km^{2}). There were 383 housing units at an average density of 382.9 per square mile (147.8/km^{2}). The racial makeup of the village was 98.66% White, 0.67% African American, 0.22% from other races, and 0.45% from two or more races. Hispanic or Latino of any race were 0.56% of the population.

There were 349 households, out of which 33.5% had children under the age of 18 living with them, 63.0% were married couples living together, 8.3% had a female householder with no husband present, and 24.9% were non-families. 21.8% of all households were made up of individuals, and 9.2% had someone living alone who was 65 years of age or older. The average household size was 2.56 and the average family size was 2.98.

In the village, the population was spread out, with 26.8% under the age of 18, 5.8% from 18 to 24, 28.3% from 25 to 44, 26.1% from 45 to 64, and 13.0% who were 65 years of age or older. The median age was 38 years. For every 100 females, there were 94.6 males. For every 100 females age 18 and over, there were 90.4 males.

The median income for a household in the village was $46,719, and the median income for a family was $51,333. Males had a median income of $40,521 versus $20,938 for females. The per capita income for the village was $18,780. About 3.7% of families and 5.3% of the population were below the poverty line, including 7.7% of those under age 18 and 0.9% of those age 65 or over.

== Education ==
The school district is River Bend Community Unit District 2.

== Notable people ==
- Nan Sheets, artist and museum director
