= Man Between Vice and Virtue =

1892 painting by Henri Martin

- L'Homme entre le vice et la virtue (French)
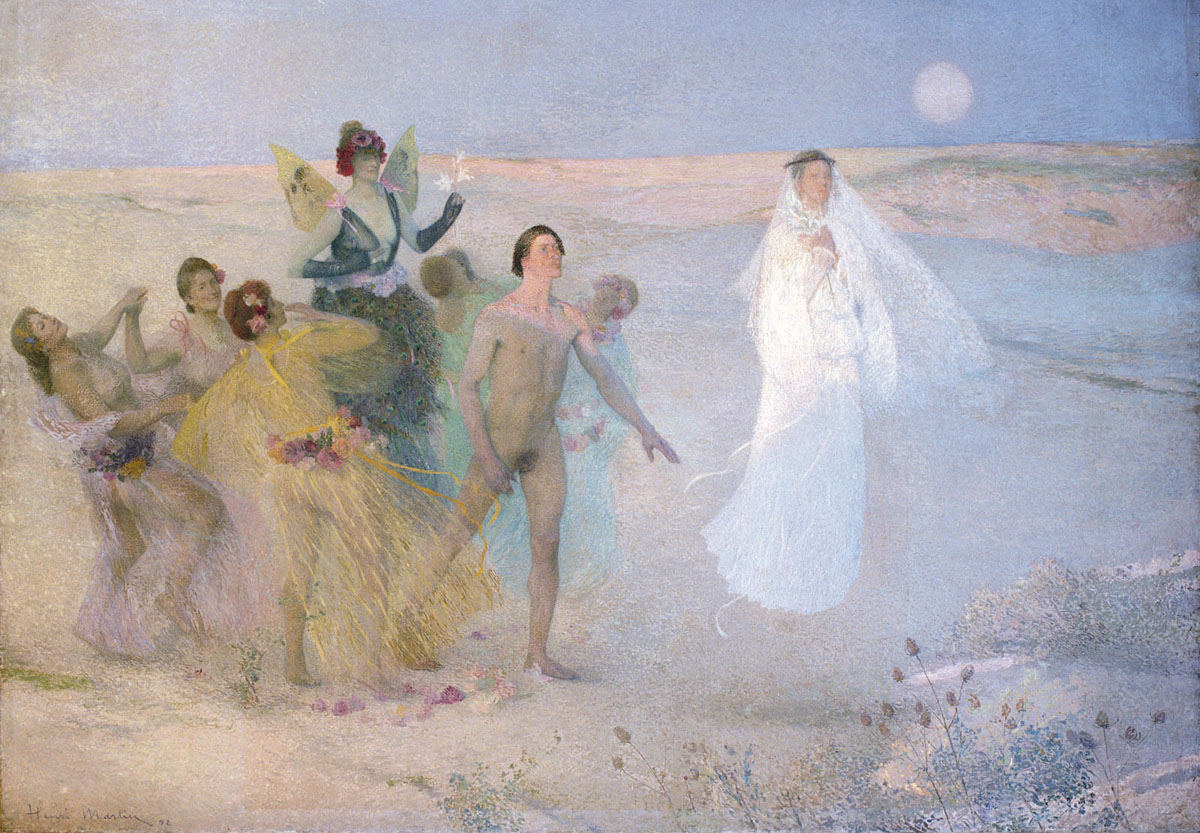
- Artist: Henri Martin
- Year: 1892
- Medium: Oil on canvas
- Dimensions: 345 cm × 496 cm (136 in × 195 in)
- Location: Musée des Augustins; Toulouse, France

Man Between Vice and Virtue (French: L'homme entre le vice et la virtue) is an 1892 symbolist painting by Henri Martin. The painting is currently housed in le Musée des Augustins, in Toulouse, France.

== Description ==
Against the backdrop of a desert landscape, a naked man appears to advance towards a floating female figure clothed in a virginal white dress that emanates in the right portion of the painting.

The man in the painting is followed by a group of women clothed in transparent flowery attire. The group seems to dance and sing in order to attract his attention. In the center of the group is a woman in black dress with peacock feathers and butterfly wings, which symbolize vice in its many forms.

The work is signed "Henri Martin 92" in the lower right corner.

== History ==
Martin adopted a divisionist (pointillist) technique upon returning to Paris from Italy in the 1880s His style was slowly transitioning from realism. This work in particular is unusual because of the realist portrayal of the man's body.
