= Clarence Bolton =

American painter

Clarence Wheeler Bolton (September 16, 1893 – January 7, 1962) was an American painter and lithographer from Woodstock, New York. He was a prominent member of the Woodstock Art Colony in the early and mid-20th century whose works have been exhibited throughout the United States and internationally.

== Early life ==
Bolton was born and raised in Wallingford, Connecticut. He attended the School of Fine Arts at Yale beginning in 1913, where he studied sculpture under Lee Lawrie, who created the sculpture of Atlas at Rockefeller Center, New York City. Because of his frail health, he was unable to complete his studies and graduate; in 1917, he was exempted from the draft due to pulmonary tuberculosis.

In 1917, Bolton traveled to Woodstock to visit a friend who lived there and to play a musical gig, and fell in love with the town. Bolton remained in Woodstock for the rest of his life. In 1921, he met Mary Louise Cashdollar, from a prominent Woodstock family, and they married in 1922.

== Career ==
In Woodstock, Bolton became enthralled with the local Catskill Mountains landscape, and so, in his words, “sort of forsook” sculpture in favor of focusing on landscape painting. He quickly began studying landscape painting under John F. Carlson, a prominent landscape painter who in 1911–1918 had headed the summertime Woodstock School of the Art Students League. Bolton later took up lithography, again focusing on landscapes. He was one of the first members of the Woodstock Artists Association.

During the Great Depression, Bolton was engaged to paint federal government artwork, most notably working jointly with Charles Rosen in painting the murals at the Beacon, New York, Post Office, which was visited by Eleanor Roosevelt when it was nearing completion. It was during this work for the Works Progress Administration's Federal Arts Project that Bolton became interested and studied lithography.

Bolton produced woodcut and linoleum-cut prints, many of which appeared in his publication, The Clatter. He also painted signs for Woodstock-area businesses. Bolton's artwork was often made into Christmas cards. He also ventured into textile design, and in 1928 won first prize out of some 1,500 entrants in the textile design competition held in New York City by the Art Alliance. Bolton also purchased a press, on which he published in 1930–1931 a magazine entitled The Clatter. The material was a mix of Bolton's own articles and opinion pieces on art, the seasons, and local events, as well as short stories, poetry, and humor pieces; it also included writings by others. It was illustrated with his own woodcut and linoleum-cut prints.

Bolton was most notable for his lithographs, especially for his high level of technical expertise and technique. His style has been described as being stylistically linked with Precisionism which flourished when Bolton was most active. While most of his subjects were traditional, serene landscapes and scenes of local village life, he gave their portrayals an original, personal twist that also reflected contemporary American and international trends in painting. This can be seen, for example, in his lithographs Politics, Country Church, In the Woods, Still Waters, Butternut Trees, Solitude, March Winds, and The Birches.

Bolton's work has been exhibited locally in the Catskills area, in major U.S. art venues and internationally. In addition to numerous local exhibitions and exhibitions at several university art museums, notable exhibition venues of his works have included the Library of Congress, the National Academy of Design, the Art Institute of Chicago, the Corcoran Gallery, the Kennedy Galleries in New York City, the Denver Art Museum, and in London at the coronation of Queen Elizabeth II.

Bolton received a number of prizes and honors in addition to the above-mentioned textile design prize, including the Warren H. Manning Purchase Prize of the Southern Society, (1938), and the Purchase Prize of the Oklahoma Art League (1939).

== Personal life ==
He and his wife Louise collaborated in local Woodstock business ventures. In the early and mid-1920s they owned a soda fountain café called The Nook, which was a hangout for the students at the Art Students League of New York who studied next door, and where artworks were exhibited. Later, after World War II, he assisted Louise in running her antique shop at The Red Barn, tending shop and refinishing early American furniture. Bolton retained his interest in music. He was an accomplished mandolinist, and also frequently played the piano at dances, hotels, and social events. He also played piano as the live musical accompaniment to silent movies in the local movie hall.

== Bibliography ==
- Smith, Anita. Woodstock: History and Hearsay. Woodstock, New York: Woodstock Arts, 2nd ed., 2006.
