= Oklahoma Art League =

Arts organization in Oklahoma City, Oklahoma

- Abbreviation: OAL
- Formation: 1910; 116 years ago
- Type: 501(c)(3)
- Headquarters: Edmond, Oklahoma, U.S.
- Location: Oklahoma City, Oklahoma, U.S.

Oklahoma Art League (OAL) is an 501(c)(3) arts organization founded in 1910 in Oklahoma City, Oklahoma. It is headquartered in Edmond, Oklahoma.

== History ==
The Oklahoma Art League was founded in 1910, as an offshoot of the Art Renaissance Club and was created for the purpose of establishing an art museum in Oklahoma City. It promoted local art education, collected artwork, and sponsored art exhibitions. Starting in November 1913, the league held an annual exhibition of local artists.

In 1935, the league partnered with the Works Progress Administration (WPA) to open an experimental gallery called the WPA Art Center in Oklahoma City. Through the continued collecting and fundraising efforts of the league, the WPA Art Center was renamed the Oklahoma Art Center and was incorporated in 1945. In 1989 there was a merger between the Oklahoma Art Center and Oklahoma Museum of Art.

This later evolved into the Oklahoma City Museum of Art (OCMOA), which opened in 2002. The OCMOA houses the Oklahoma Art League Collection, a collections of some 90 pieces of artwork. The exhibition, Highlights from the Oklahoma Art League was held at OCMOA from November 9, 2010 to August 28, 2011.

In 2025, the Oklahoma Museums Association presented the league with a certification of recognition.

== Notable members ==
- Clarence Bolton (1893–1962), painter and lithographer
- Oscar Brousse Jacobson (1882–1966), painter and museum curator
- Doel Reed (1894–1985), painter, and printmaker
- Nan Sheets (1885–1976), painter, printmaker, and museum director
- Nellie Ellen Shepherd (1877–1920), painter
