= Louise Caldwell Murdock =

- Born: 1857; Caneada, New York
- Died: 1915 (aged 57–58); Wichita, Kansas
- Education: Studied with Frank Alvah Parsons, founder of the Parsons School of Fine and Applied Art Interior Architecture (1906)
- Occupation: Architect
- Buildings: Wichita Public Library, Caldwell-Murdock Building, Murdock Theater
- Projects: 20th Century Club of Wichita

Louise Caldwell Murdock (1857–1915) was an American interior designer / architect. Louise's father, J.E. Caldwell brought his family to Wichita from New York in 1871 and opened a Queens Ware (a hard, cream-colored earthenware, perfected c1765 by Wedgwood) store on North Main Street. She married Roland Pierpont Murdock in 1877 and founded the Twentieth Century Club with him in 1899 in Wichita. She served as its president until 1906. After her husband's death in 1906, she studied interior design with Frank Alvah Parsons in New York City, then returned to Wichita Kansas and designed and built the Caldwell Murdock building on East Douglas, which at seven floors became Wichita's tallest building.

Dedicated to making her dream of having an art museum in her hometown, a reality, Louise Murdock generously donated her family fortune to acquire a "significant collection" of American art; mention in her will, written in 1995). She entrusted the task of assembling the art collection to her trusty friend and professional colleague Elizabeth Stubblefield Navas. Together, the two visionaries made history in Wichita and surrounding region that stands firmly till date. The Wichita Art Museum opened in 1935 and it houses the infamous collection of Ronald P. Murdock which is considered as one of the premier collections of American art.
