= Thayer, Kansas =

City in Neosho County, Kansas

- City
- Location within Neosho County and Kansas

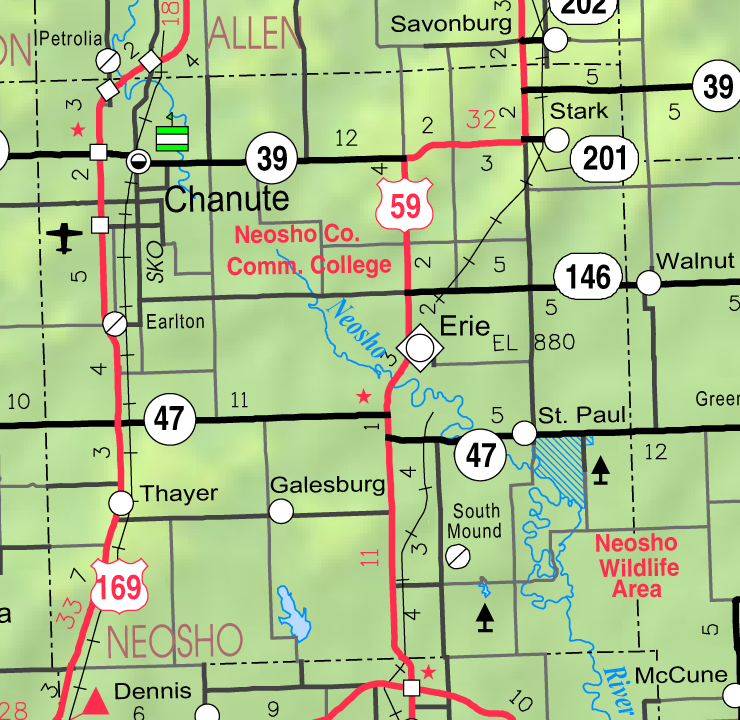
- KDOT map of Neosho County (legend)
- Coordinates: 37°29′20″N 95°28′36″W
- Country: United States
- State: Kansas
- County: Neosho
- Founded: 1870
- Platted: 1870
- Incorporated: 1871
- Named for: Nathaniel Thayer

Area
  - Total: 0.80 sq mi (2.07 km^{2})
  - Land: 0.75 sq mi (1.95 km^{2})
  - Water: 0.046 sq mi (0.12 km^{2})
- Elevation: 1,024 ft (312 m)

Population (2020)
  - Total: 432
  - Density: 574/sq mi (222/km^{2})
- Time zone: UTC-6 (CST)
  - Summer (DST): UTC-5 (CDT)
- ZIP Code: 66776
- Area code: 620
- FIPS code: 20-70300
- GNIS ID: 2396047
- Website: thayerks.com

Thayer is a city in Neosho County, Kansas, United States. As of the 2020 census, the population of the city was 432.

== History ==
Thayer was laid out in the fall of 1870 when the railroad was extended to that point. It was named for Nathaniel Thayer, a railroad employee. The town was built up quickly and was incorporated as a city in 1871.

== Geography ==
According to the United States Census Bureau, the city has a total area of 0.80 square miles (2.07 km^{2}), of which 0.75 square miles (1.94 km^{2}) is land and 0.05 square miles (0.13 km^{2}) is water.

=== Climate ===
The climate in this area is characterized by hot, humid summers and generally mild to cool winters. According to the Köppen Climate Classification system, Thayer has a humid subtropical climate, abbreviated "Cfa" on climate maps.

== Demographics ==
Historical population
| Census | Pop. | Note | %± |
|---|---|---|---|
| 1880 | 311 | | — |
| 1890 | 544 | | 74.9% |
| 1900 | 542 | | −0.4% |
| 1910 | 542 | | 0.0% |
| 1920 | 528 | | −2.6% |
| 1930 | 495 | | −6.2% |
| 1940 | 461 | | −6.9% |
| 1950 | 423 | | −8.2% |
| 1960 | 396 | | −6.4% |
| 1970 | 430 | | 8.6% |
| 1980 | 517 | | 20.2% |
| 1990 | 435 | | −15.9% |
| 2000 | 500 | | 14.9% |
| 2010 | 497 | | −0.6% |
| 2020 | 432 | | −13.1% |
U.S. Decennial Census

=== 2010 census ===
As of the census of 2010, there were 497 people, 197 households, and 136 families residing in the city. The population density was 662.7 inhabitants per square mile (255.9/km^{2}). There were 221 housing units at an average density of 294.7 per square mile (113.8/km^{2}). The racial makeup of the city was 95.6% White, 0.8% Native American, 0.2% Asian, and 3.4% from two or more races. Hispanic or Latino of any race were 1.8% of the population.

There were 197 households, of which 34.5% had children under the age of 18 living with them, 57.9% were married couples living together, 6.1% had a female householder with no husband present, 5.1% had a male householder with no wife present, and 31.0% were non-families. 27.4% of all households were made up of individuals, and 11.2% had someone living alone who was 65 years of age or older. The average household size was 2.52 and the average family size was 3.05.

The median age in the city was 37.1 years. 25.8% of residents were under the age of 18; 9.8% were between the ages of 18 and 24; 24.6% were from 25 to 44; 25% were from 45 to 64; and 14.5% were 65 years of age or older. The gender makeup of the city was 53.7% male and 46.3% female.

=== 2000 census ===
As of the census of 2000, there were 500 people, 183 households, and 137 families residing in the city. The population density was 751.5 inhabitants per square mile (290.2/km^{2}). There were 203 housing units at an average density of 305.1 per square mile (117.8/km^{2}). The racial makeup of the city was 95.60% White, 1.40% Native American, 1.40% from other races, and 1.60% from two or more races. Hispanic or Latino of any race were 2.20% of the population.

There were 183 households, out of which 39.3% had children under the age of 18 living with them, 59.0% were married couples living together, 12.0% had a female householder with no husband present, and 24.6% were non-families. 21.9% of all households were made up of individuals, and 6.6% had someone living alone who was 65 years of age or older. The average household size was 2.73 and the average family size was 3.18.

In the city, the population was spread out, with 31.8% under the age of 18, 8.2% from 18 to 24, 30.4% from 25 to 44, 17.4% from 45 to 64, and 12.2% who were 65 years of age or older. The median age was 33 years. For every 100 females, there were 103.3 males. For every 100 females age 18 and over, there were 92.7 males.

The median income for a household in the city was $35,288, and the median income for a family was $38,250. Males had a median income of $25,625 versus $18,906 for females. The per capita income for the city was $13,497. About 8.9% of families and 9.9% of the population were below the poverty line, including 14.7% of those under age 18 and 18.4% of those age 65 or over.

== Education ==
Thayer is served by Cherryvale USD 447 public school district.

Thayer High School was closed when it was a part of Erie USD 101. Following the closure, Thayer's portion of the district was transferred to Cherryvale school district. The Thayer school's mascot was the Flyer.

== Transportation ==
The nearest intercity bus stop is located in Chanute. Service is provided by Jefferson Lines on a route from Minneapolis to Tulsa.

== Notable people ==
- Nellie Shepherd, painter
