= Wichita Art Museum =

Art museum in Kansas

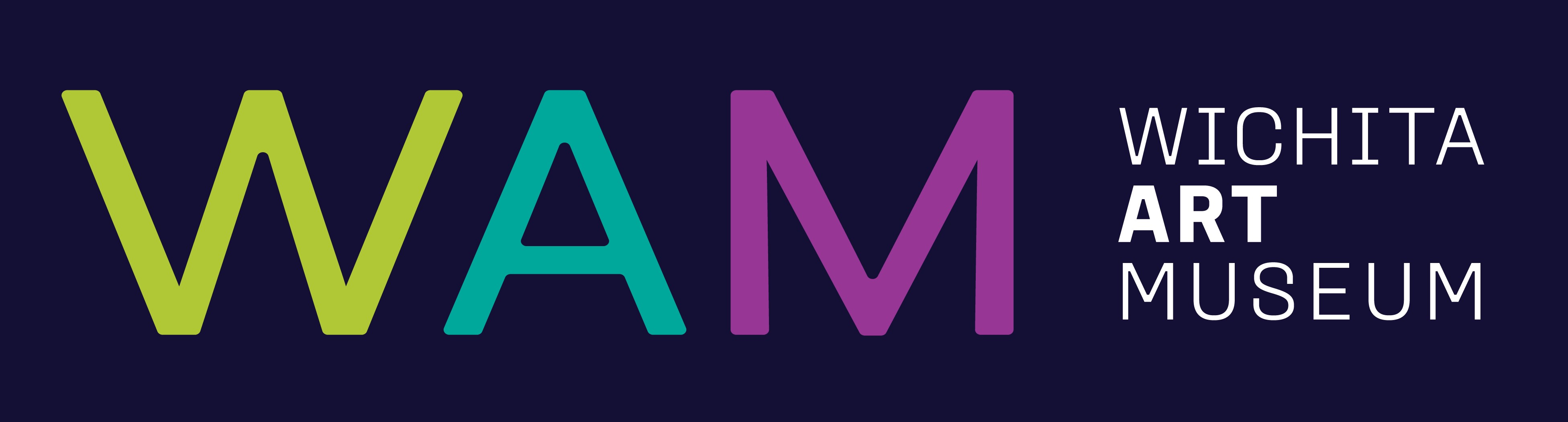

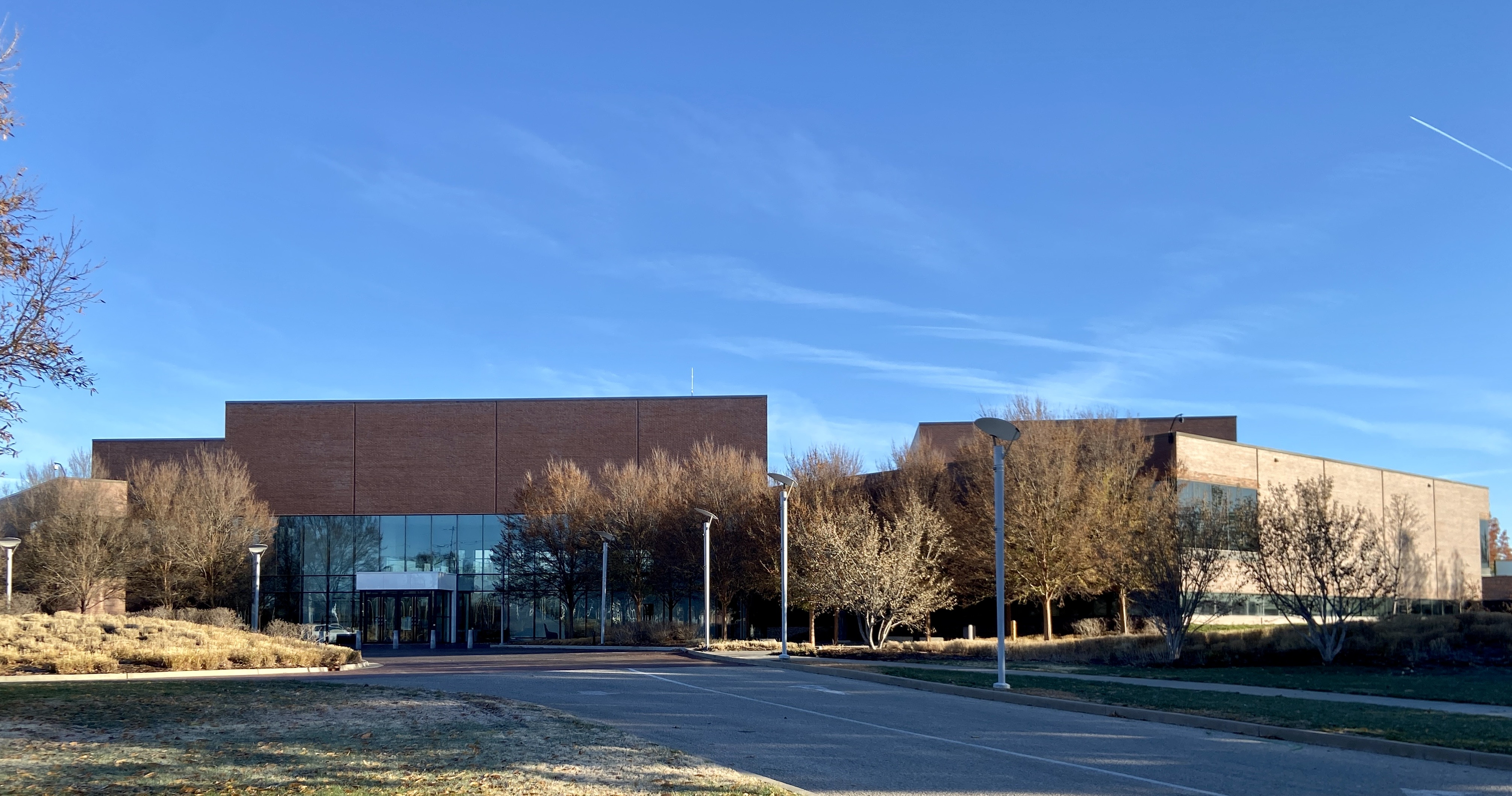
- Main entrance in 2023
- Interactive fullscreen map
- Established: 1915; 111 years ago
- Location: 1400 W Museum Blvd; Wichita, Kansas; United States
- Coordinates: 37°41′41″N 97°21′23″W
- Type: Art museum
- Collection size: 12,000 works
- Visitors: 80,000 (2023)
- Founder: Louise Caldwell Murdock
- Director: Molly McFerson
- Website: wam.org

The Wichita Art Museum (also known as WAM) is an art museum located in Wichita, Kansas. Exclusively focused on American art, its collection comprises over 12,000 items, a selection of which is displayed across 31,500 sq. ft. (2,900 m²) of galleries.

The museum was established in 1915, when Louise Caldwell Murdock's will created a trust to start the Roland P. Murdock Collection of art in memory of her husband. The first museum building, designed by New York architect Clarence Stein, opened in 1935 with art borrowed from other institutions, as the first work in the Murdock Collection was only purchased in 1939. Elizabeth Stubblefield Navas, a friend of Louise Murdock's, selected and purchased works for the collection until 1962. A foundation was established two years later for the purpose of raising funds for new acquisitions.

The museum building was enlarged with a new lobby and two new wings designed by Robert J. Schaefer in 1963, before the city commissioned architect Edward Larrabee Barnes to design a new and larger climate controlled facility, completed in 1977. In 2003, the museum inaugurated another expansion, which expanded the total area of the museum to 115,000 sq. ft. (10,700 m²).

Tera Hedrick, an art historian and Wichita East High School graduate, was hired as curator in 2017 after serving in an interim role. In January 2020, the museum announced that it would begin renovation on its main entrance and lobby, which was completed that year.

== Gallery ==
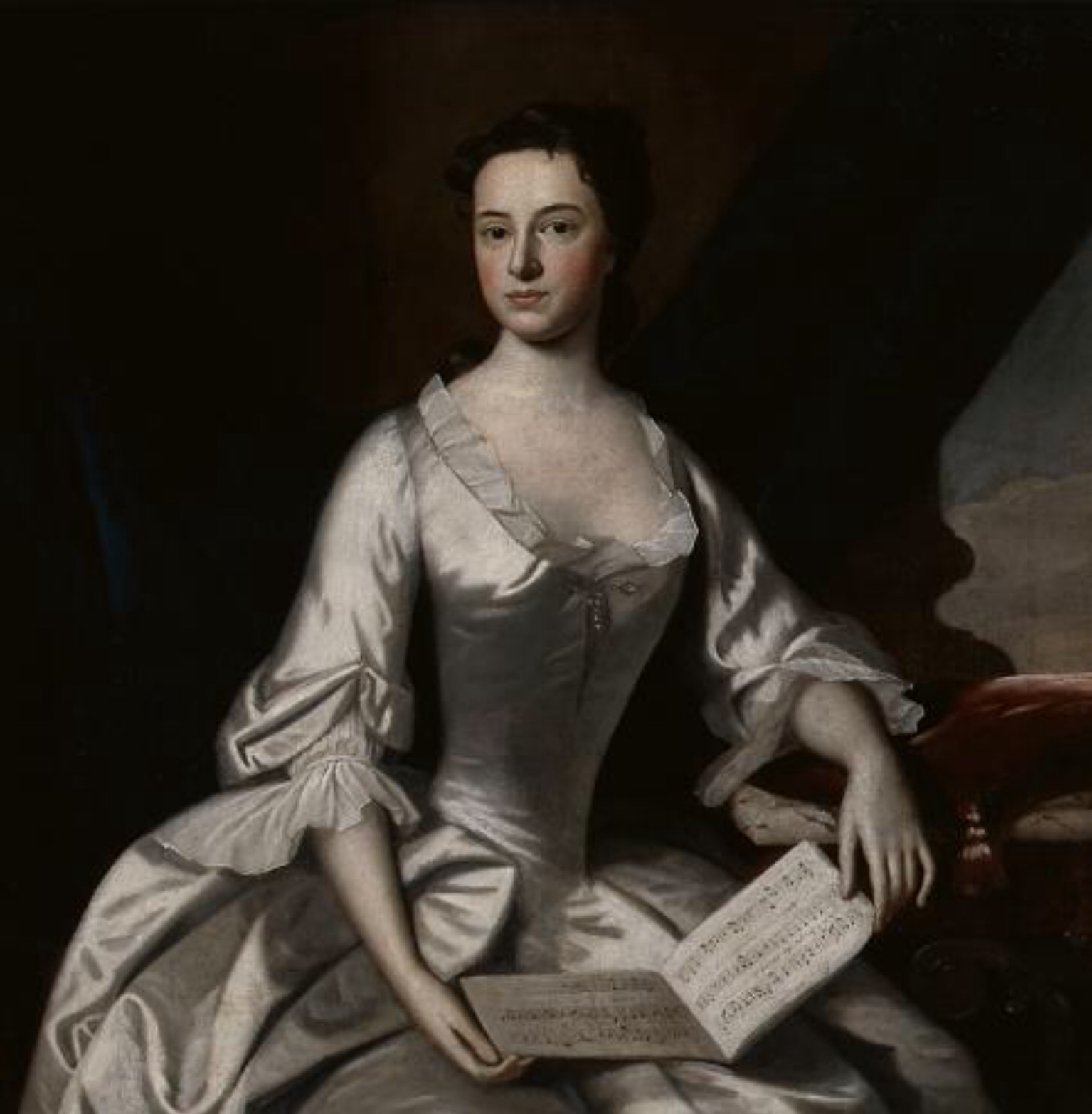
Robert Feke, Mrs Barlow Trecothick (c. 1748)

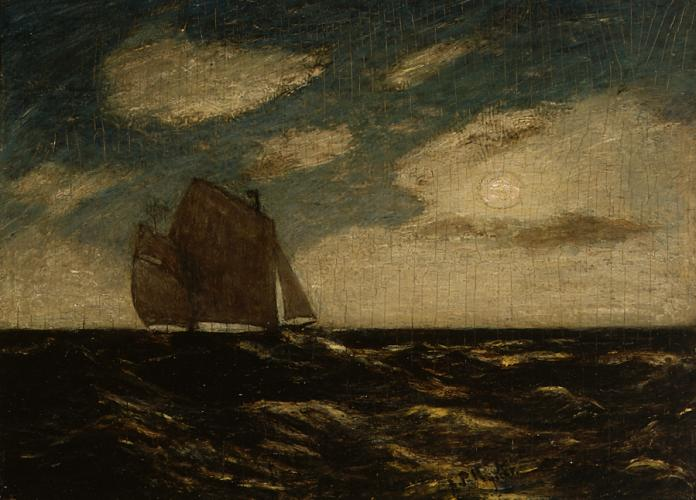
Albert Pinkham, Ryder Moonlight on the Sea (1884)

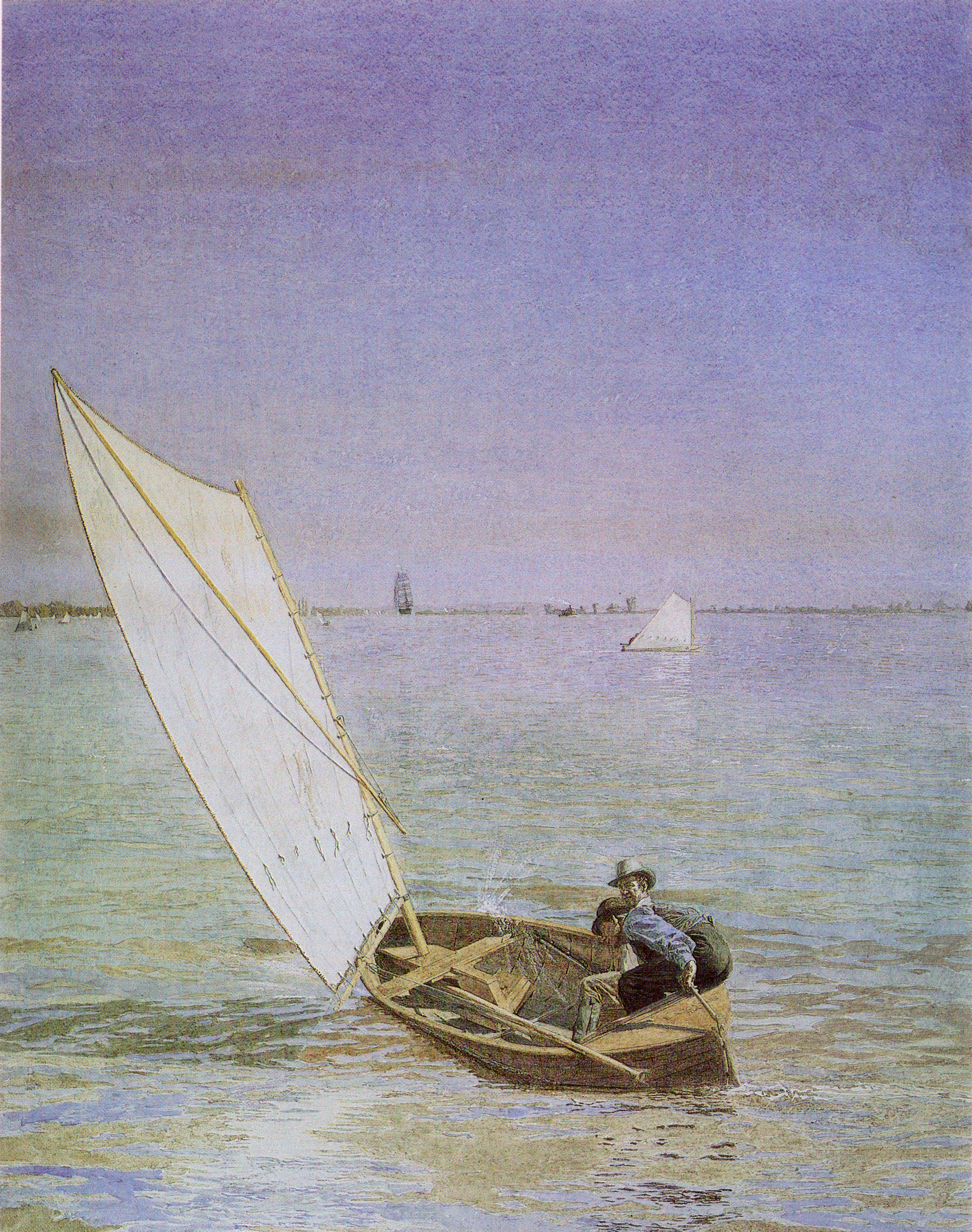
Thomas Eakins, Starting Out After Rail (c. 1863)

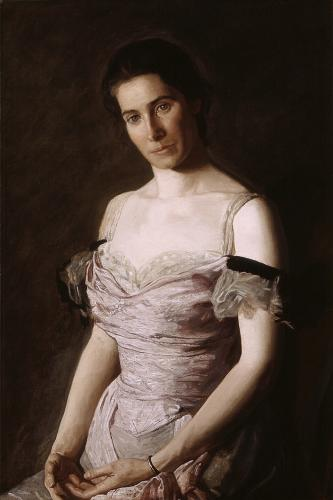
Thomas Eakins, Mrs. Mary Hallock Greenwalt (1903)

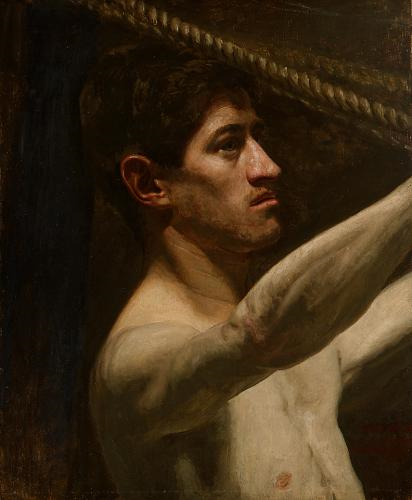
Thomas Eakins, Billy Smith (1898)

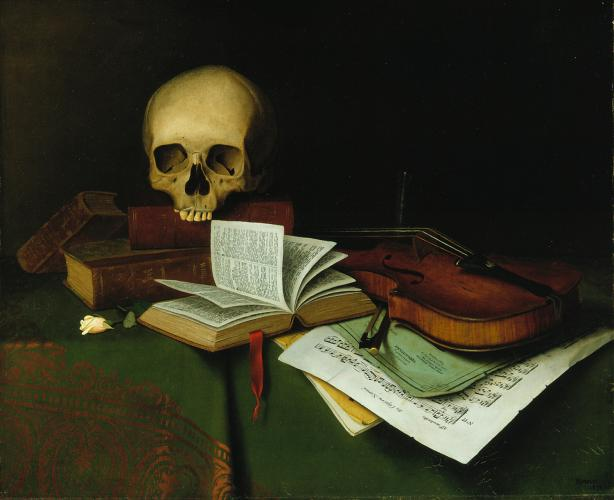
William Michael Harnett, Mortality and Immortality (1876)

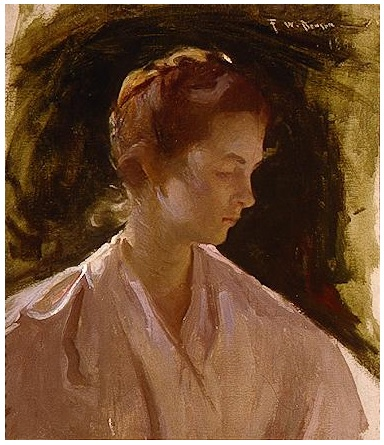
Frank Weston Benson, A Young Girl (1895)
