= Oklahoma City Museum of Art =

Museum in Oklahoma City, Oklahoma

Coordinates: 35°28′11″N 97°31′14″W

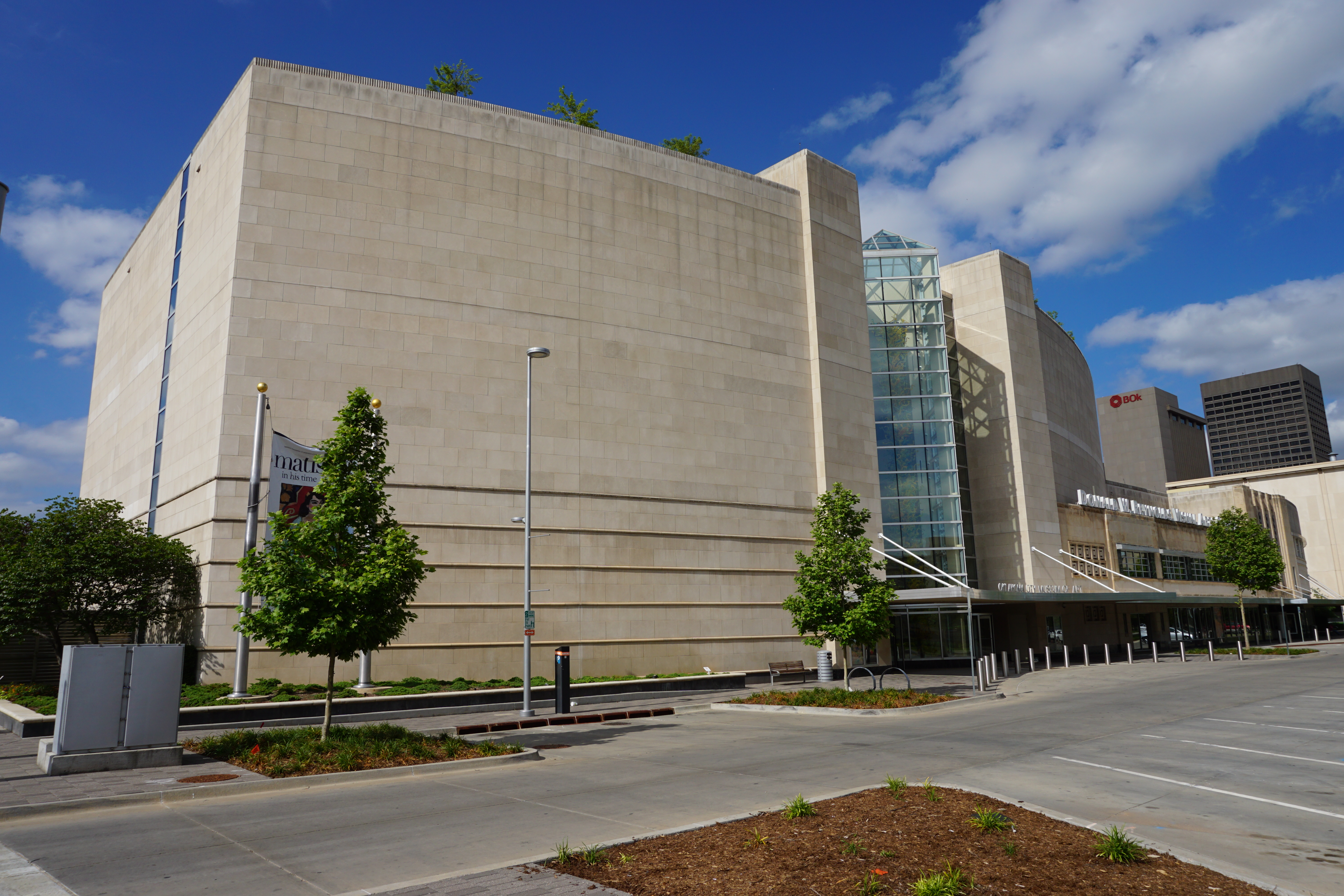
The front of the museum in May 2016

The Oklahoma City Museum of Art (OKCMOA) is a museum located in the Donald W. Reynolds Visual Arts Center in Oklahoma City, Oklahoma, United States. The museum features traveling special exhibitions, original selections from its own collection, a theater showing a variety of foreign, independent, and classic films each week, and a restaurant. OKCMOA also houses a collection of Chihuly glass among the most comprehensive in the world, including the 55-foot Eleanor Blake Kirkpatrick Memorial Tower in the museum's atrium.In 1968 when the Washington Gallery of Modern Art closed, OKMOA acquired the collection, and has since presented exhibitions featuring the Washington Color School artists, represented in the postwar contemporary collection of paintings.

== History and development ==
The Oklahoma City Museum of Art traces its origins to early projects of the Oklahoma Art League and Art Renaissance Club—groups that promoted art education in early Oklahoma City. Later, more formal programs emerged, with an Experimental Gallery by the Works Progress Administration (WPA), open to the public. When the museum incorporated, May 18, 1945, the federally funded gallery became a private institution.

Today's Oklahoma City Museum of Art was synthesized from two predecessor institutions: the Oklahoma Art Center (an outgrowth of the WPA Experimental Gallery), and the Oklahoma Museum of Art. Both institutions had been committed to art-collecting, exhibitions and public programs — but the 1980s downturn in the oil industry created a depressed local economy, undermining the city's ability to support two art institutions. That led to a 1989 merger of the two museums.

Museum leaders acted to create a new Oklahoma City Museum of Art as a single, financially secure institution. The Donald W. Reynolds Foundation provided a $14.5 million capital grant, and further support was acquired from over 500 corporations, foundations, and individual donors, yielding $40 million, in entirely private funds, to build and endow the new museum. In March, 2002, the Donald W. Reynolds Visual Arts Center, of the Oklahoma City Museum of Art, opened. The museum now receives over 125,000 visitors annually, with a permanent collection, a cycle of temporary exhibitions, various education opportunities, an international film program, and a Museum Store.

== Exhibitions ==
- Dale Chihuly: An Inaugural Exhibition (from March 16, 2002 – August 4, 2002)
- Kehinde Wiley: A New Republic (from June 17, 2017 – September 11, 2017)
- Paul Reed: A Retrospective (from November 22, 2025 - April 12, 2026)
- The Legacy of the Washington Color School (from November 22, 2025 - April 12, 2026)
