= Symbolist painting =

19th-century cultural movement

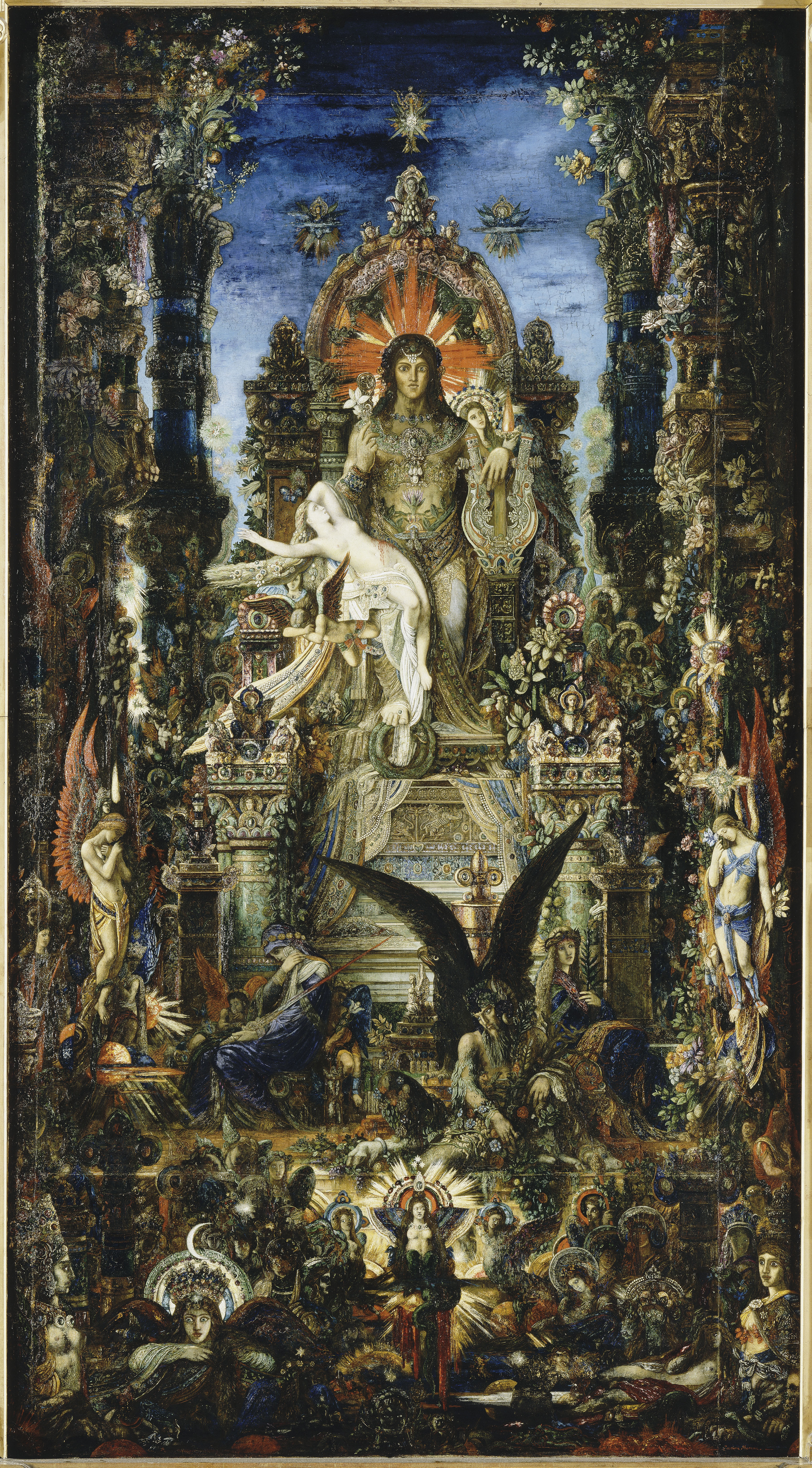
Jupiter and Semele (1894–1895), by Gustave Moreau, Musée Gustave Moreau, Paris

Symbolist painting was one of the main artistic manifestations of symbolism, a cultural movement that emerged at the end of the 19th century in France and developed in several European countries. The beginning of this current was in poetry, especially thanks to the impact of The Flowers of Evil by Charles Baudelaire (1868), which powerfully influenced a generation of young poets including Paul Verlaine, Stéphane Mallarmé and Arthur Rimbaud. The term "symbolism" was coined by Jean Moréas in a literary manifesto published in Le Figaro in 1886. The aesthetic premises of Symbolism moved from poetry to other arts, especially painting, sculpture, music and theater. The chronology of this style is difficult to establish: the peak is between 1885 and 1905, but already in the 1860s there were works pointing to symbolism, while its culmination can be established at the beginning of the First World War.

In painting, symbolism was a fantastic and dreamlike style that emerged as a reaction to the naturalism of the Realist painting and Impressionist trends, whose objectivity and detailed description of reality were opposed by the Symbolists' subjectivity and the depiction of the occult and the irrational. Just as in poetry the rhythm of words served to express a transcendent meaning, in painting they sought ways for color and line to express ideas. In this movement, all the arts were related and thus the painting of Redon was often compared to the poetry of Baudelaire or the music of Debussy.

This style placed a special emphasis on the world of dreams and mysticism, as well as on various aspects of counterculture and marginality, such as esotericism, Satanism, terror, death, sin, sex and perversion—symptomatic in this sense is the fascination of these artists with the figure of the femme fatale. All this was manifested in line with decadentism, a fin-de-siecle cultural current that stressed the most existential aspects of life and pessimism as a vital attitude, as well as the evasion and exaltation of the unconscious. Another current linked to symbolism was aestheticism, a reaction to the prevailing utilitarianism of the time and to the ugliness and materialism of the industrial era. Against this, art and beauty were granted their own autonomy, synthesized in Théophile Gautier's formula "art for art's sake" (L'art pour l'art). Some Symbolist artists were also linked to theosophy and esoteric organizations such as the Rosicrucians. Stylistically there was great diversity within Symbolist painting, as is denoted by comparing the sumptuous exoticism of Gustave Moreau with the melancholic serenity of Pierre Puvis de Chavannes.

Pictorial symbolism was related to other earlier and later movements: Pre-Raphaelitism is usually considered an antecedent of this movement, while at the beginning of the 20th century it was linked to Expressionism, especially thanks to figures such as Edvard Munch and James Ensor. On the other hand, some schools or artistic associations such as the Pont-Aven School or the group of the Nabis are considered symbolist or directly related to symbolism. They were also heirs to some extent of Neo-Impressionism, whose pointillist technique was the first to break with Impressionist naturalism. On the other hand, Post-Impressionist Paul Gauguin exerted a powerful influence on the beginnings of Symbolism, thanks to his links with the Pont-Aven School and Cloisonnism. This current was also linked to modernism, known as Art Nouveau in France, Modern Style in United Kingdom, Jugendstil in Germany, Sezession in Austria or Liberty in Italy.

== General characteristics ==
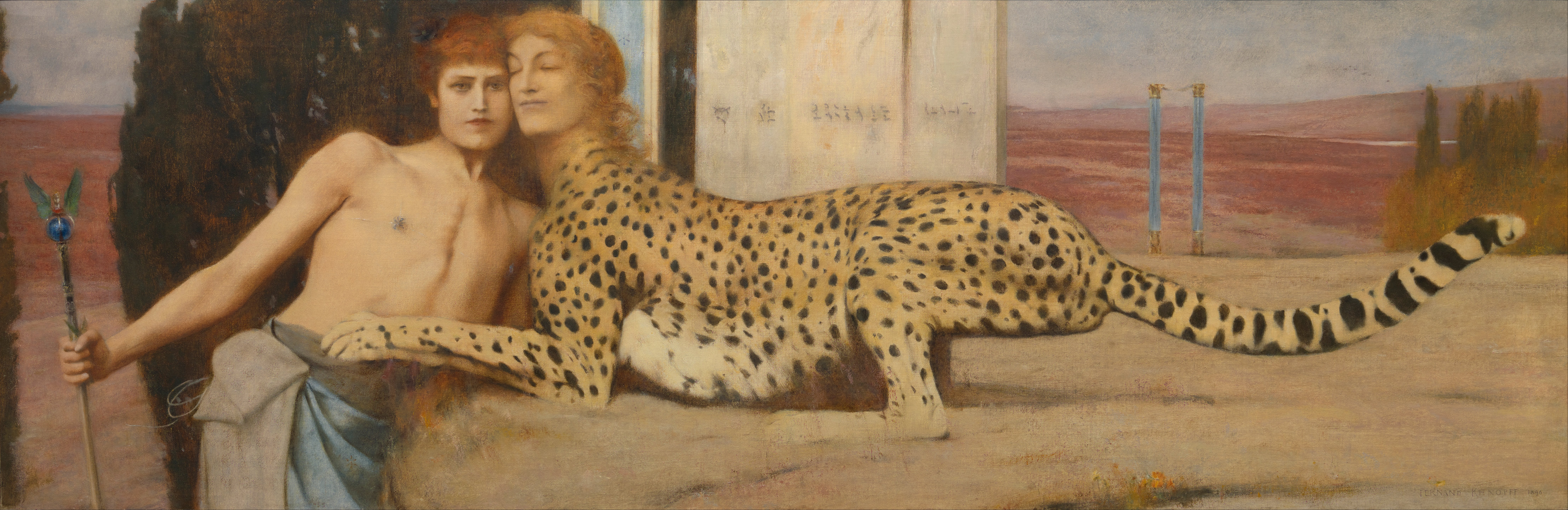
Art (Caress of the Sphinx) (1896), by Fernand Khnopff, Royal Museums of Fine Arts of Belgium, Brussels

Symbolism emerged as a reaction to the multiple tendencies linked to realism in the field of culture throughout the 19th century. Factors such as the progress of science since the Renaissance—which in this century led to scientific positivism, the development of industry and commerce that originated with capitalism and the Industrial Revolution, the preference of the bourgeoisie for cultural naturalism, and the emergence of socialism with its tendency toward philosophical materialism, led to a clear preference for artistic realism throughout the century, which was evident in movements such as realist painting and impressionism. In contrast to this, first poets and then artists expressed a new way of understanding life, more subjective and spiritual, a reflection of their existential anguish in a time of loss of both moral and religious values, which is why they entered into the search for a new language and a new category of values that manifest their inner world, their beliefs, their emotions, their fears, their longings. According to Johannes Dobai, "Symbolist art tends to generalize, through images, an individual, or rather unconscious, experience of the world."

Symbolism was an eclectic movement, which brought together a number of artists with common concerns and sensibilities. More than a homogeneous style, it was an amalgam of styles grouped by a series of common factors, such as themes, ways of understanding life and art, literary and musical influences, and an opposition to realism and scientific positivism. It was a sometimes contradictory movement, which mixed the desire for modernity and a break with tradition with nostalgia for the past, the ugliness of decadentism with the beauty of aestheticism; serenity with exaltation, reason with madness. There is also an overlap between different styles that coexist simultaneously: Neo-Impressionism and Post-Impressionism, modernism, symbolism, synthetism, ingenuism; as well as between the plastic arts: painting, sculpture, illustration, decorative arts, and between these and poetry, theater, and music.

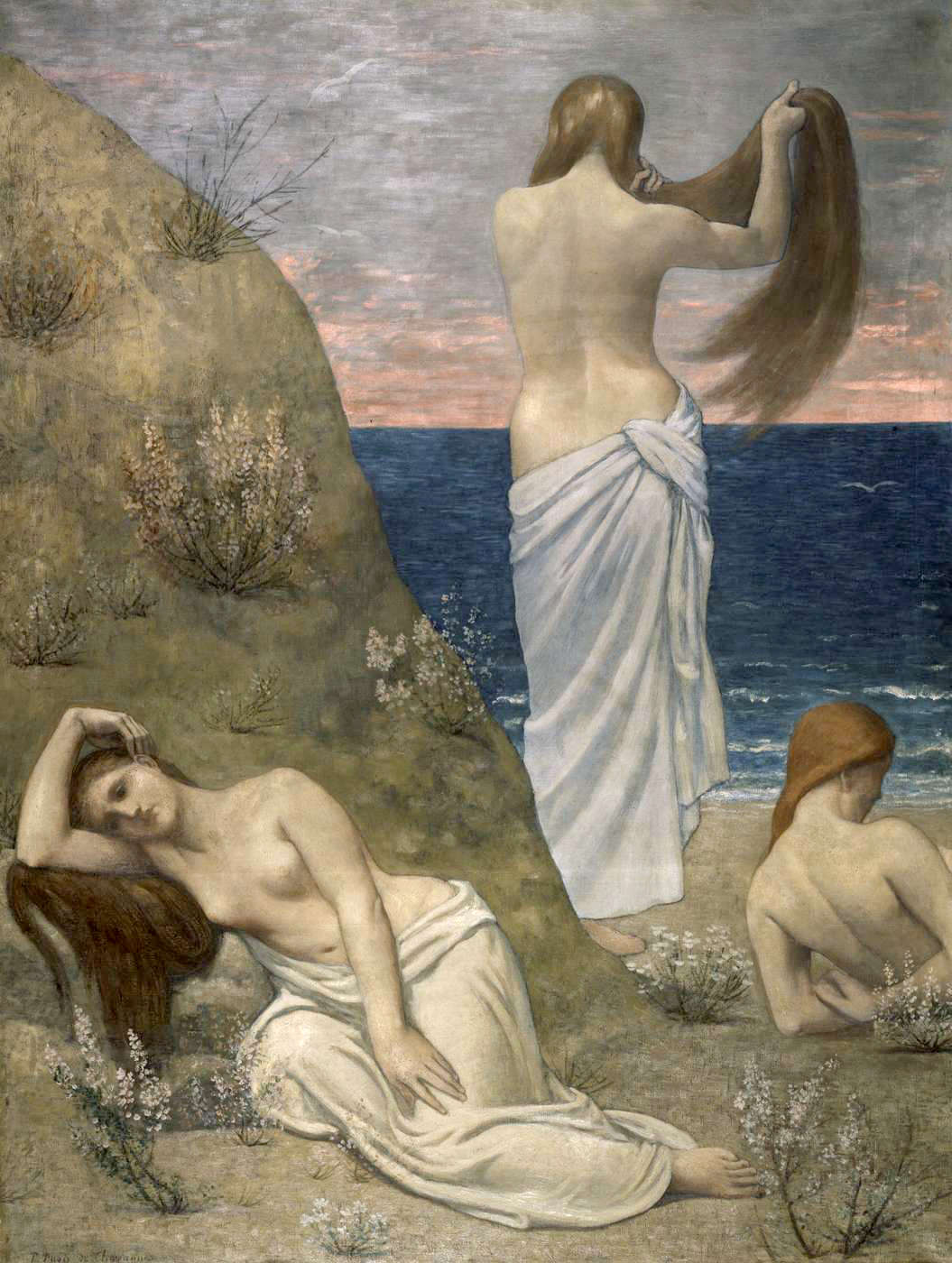
Young Girls by the Seaside (1879), by Pierre Puvis de Chavannes, Musée d'Orsay, Paris

Art historiography has found it difficult to establish stylistic parameters common to symbolism. For a time, any work of art from the second half of the 19th century with a dreamlike or psychological content was considered symbolist. Finally it was considered to be a broad cultural current covering a timeline between the late 19th and early 20th centuries developed throughout Europe—including Russia—and with some reminiscences in the United States, a current that agglutinated totally or partially diverse autonomous styles, such as the English Pre-Raphaelitism, the French Nabis, the modernism present for example in Gustav Klimt or even an incipient Expressionism perceptible in the work of Edvard Munch. According to Philippe Jullian, "there has never been a symbolist school of painting, but rather a symbolist taste."

Symbolism exalts subjectivity, the inner experience. According to Amy Dempsey, "the Symbolists were the first artists to declare that the true aim of art was the inner world of mood and emotion, rather than the objective world of outward appearances". To this end, they used the symbol as a vehicle for the expression of their emotions, which took the form of images of strong subjective and irrational content, in which dreams, visions, fantastic worlds recreated by the artist predominate, with a certain tendency towards the morbid and perverse, tormented eroticism, loneliness and existential anguish.

In this style, the symbol is an "agent of communication with mystery," allowing the expression of hidden intuitions and mental processes in a way that would not be possible in a conventional medium of expression. The symbol makes manifest the ambiguous, the mysterious, the inexpressible, the hidden. Symbolist art exalts the idea, the latent, the subjective; it is an externalization of the artist's self, hence their interest in intangible concepts, religion, mythology, fantasy, legend, as well as hermeticism, occultism and even Satanism. According to the critic Roger Marx they were artists who sought to "give form to the dream."

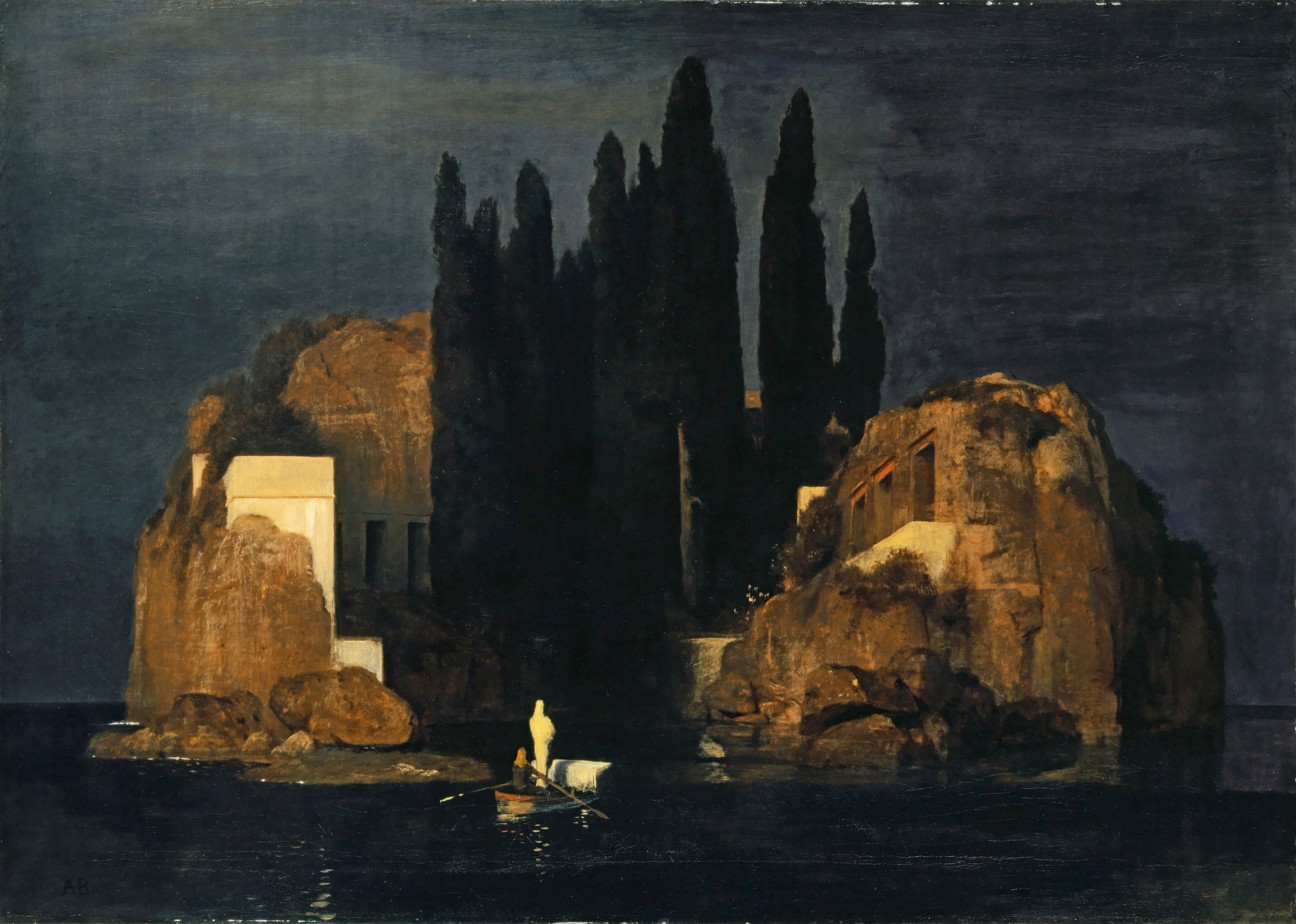
Isle of the Dead (1880), by Arnold Böcklin, Kunstmuseum, Basel

Against naturalism, artifice is defended, against the modern the primitive, against the objective the subjective, against the rational the irrational, against the social order the marginalization, against the conscious the hidden and mysterious. The artist no longer recreates nature, but builds his own world, liberates himself expressively and creatively, aspires to the total work of art, in which he takes care of all the details and becomes an absolute creator. Paul Cézanne considered art as "a harmony parallel to nature"; and Oscar Wilde stated that "art is always more abstract than we imagine. Form and color speak to us of form and color, and that is all". With Symbolist art, the autonomy of artistic language is achieved: art breaks with tradition and builds a parallel universe, paving a virgin ground that will serve as a foundation for new ways of understanding art in the early 20th century: the historical avant-garde.

Symbolism was also an attempt to save Western humanistic culture, called into question since the Copernican Revolution relegated the Earth as the center of the universe and, especially, since the Darwinian theory of evolution relegated the human being from his condition as sovereign of creation. Faced with the excessive scientism of Western 19th century culture, the symbolists sought to recover human values, but they found themselves in a scenario in which these were already distorted, in crisis, so what they recovered were values in decadence, the darkest side of the human being, but the only one they could rescue. According to art historian Jean Clair, his "aim was to transform the cultural crisis that reached its zenith in the belle époque into a culture of crisis."

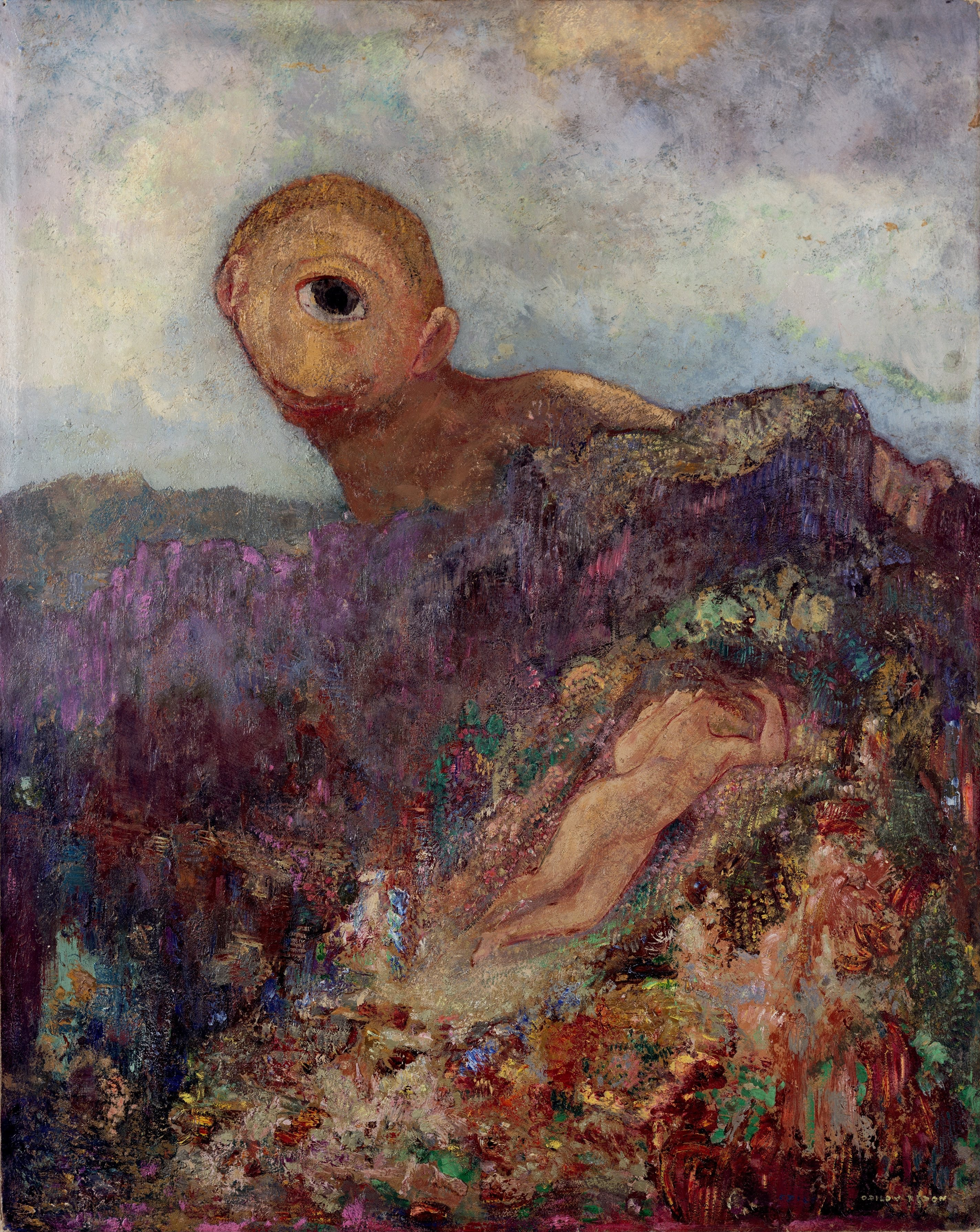
The Cyclops (1914), by Odilon Redon, Kröller-Müller Museum, Otterlo

One of the essential features of symbolism was subjectivity, the exaltation of individualism, of personal temperament, of individual rebellion. Remy de Gourmont said that "symbolism is, although excessive, intemperate and pretentious, the expression of individualism in art"; and Odilon Redon was of the opinion that "the future is in a subjective world". This exaltation of individual will entails the absence in this current of distinctive stylistic hallmarks common to all the artists, who are united more by a series of abstract concepts than by an established methodological program. Among these shared concepts are mysticism, religiosity and aestheticism, linked to an idealistic philosophy impregnated with fin-de-siecle pessimism that has its maximum expression in Nietzsche and Schopenhauer. Also common to most of these artists is a taste for magic, theosophy and occult sciences, and a certain attraction to Satanism. In relation to this, a work of reference for Symbolist artists was Eduard von Hartmann's Philosophy of the Unconscious (1877), in which it was stated that art should be a method of penetrating the unconscious and revealing its most hidden mysteries.

In connection with a taste for the mysterious and unconscious, the Symbolists showed a special preference for allegory, for the representation of ideas through images evocative of those ideas. For this purpose they often resorted to emblematics, mythology and iconography related to medieval legends and figures from popular folklore, especially in Germanic and Scandinavian countries. Another variant of the occult was the attraction to eroticism, latent in artists such as Moreau or Redon and evident in Rops, Stuck, Klimt, Beardsley or Mossa. Ultimately, this attraction also led to the exploration of death or illness, as in Munch, Ensor and Strindberg.

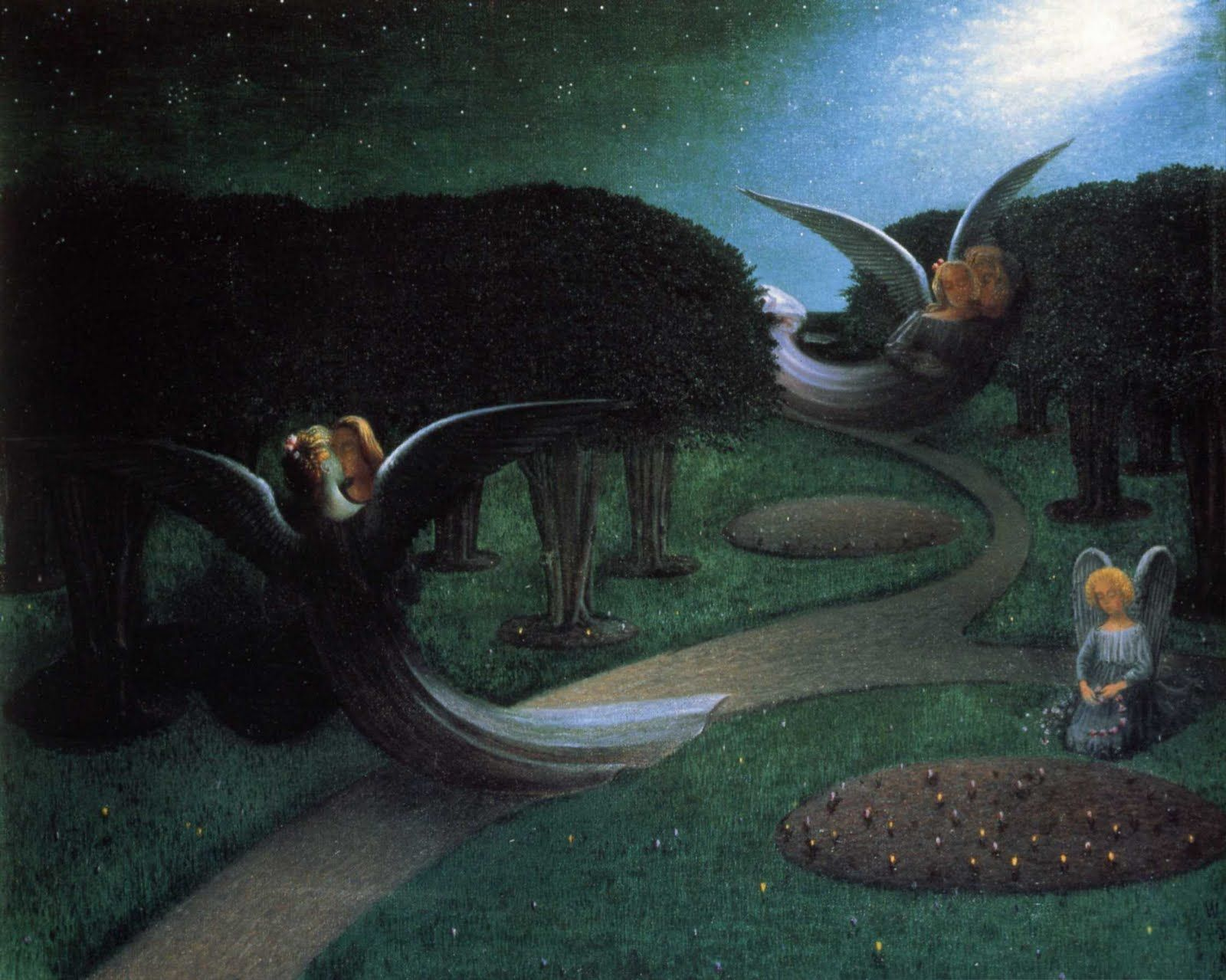
Angels in the Night (1891), by William Degouve de Nuncques, Kröller-Müller Museum, Otterlo

Another characteristic of Symbolist art was synesthesia, the search for a relationship between pictorial qualities (line, color, rhythm) and other sensory qualities such as sound and scent: Gauguin thus spoke of the "musical aspect" of his art; Rimbaud related vowels to colors (A-black, E-blue, I-red, O-yellow, U-green); Baudelaire also applied colors to perfumes. This interrelation between the senses was theorized by Baudelaire in his Correspondence (1857), in which he defended the expressiveness of art as a means of satisfying all the senses simultaneously. On the other hand, the Lithuanian Mikalojus Konstantinas Čiurlionis, who was a painter and composer, created a theory whereby color was the point of union between the various arts, which in painting was the link between the various motifs and in music was an image of the divine cosmic order.

Symbolist painting advocated memory composition as opposed to the à plein air painting advocated by Impressionism. One of its essential features was the line, in sinuous contours of organic appearance, a fluid and dynamic, stylized line, in which representation passes from naturalism to analogy. It reclaims the two-dimensionality inherent to painting, abandoning perspective and the representation of an illusory space, gravity, the three-dimensional appearance.

Among the motifs favored by the Symbolists are traditional themes—though frequently reinterpreted—and newly invented ones. Among the former are portraits, landscapes and narrative painting of tales and legends, which serve as new avenues for symbolizing concepts such as love, loneliness, nostalgia, etc. Symbolist portraiture is one of psychological introspection, often idealized, especially in the woman, in whom the eyes, mouth and hair are emphasized. Baudelaire compared the eyes to jewels and the hair to a symphony of scents or a sea of waves. The eyes were considered mirrors of the soul, generally nostalgic and melancholic. As for the mouth, it could be large like a flower or small as a symbol of silence, as in the work of Fernand Khnopff. As for the landscape, they preferred—as in Romanticism—solitary and nostalgic places, evocative, suggestive, preferably wild and abandoned, unsullied by man, in open, almost infinite horizons. They are not usually empty landscapes, but generally resort to human presence, for which the landscape is a vehicle of evocation or a projection of psychic states.

=== Antecedents ===
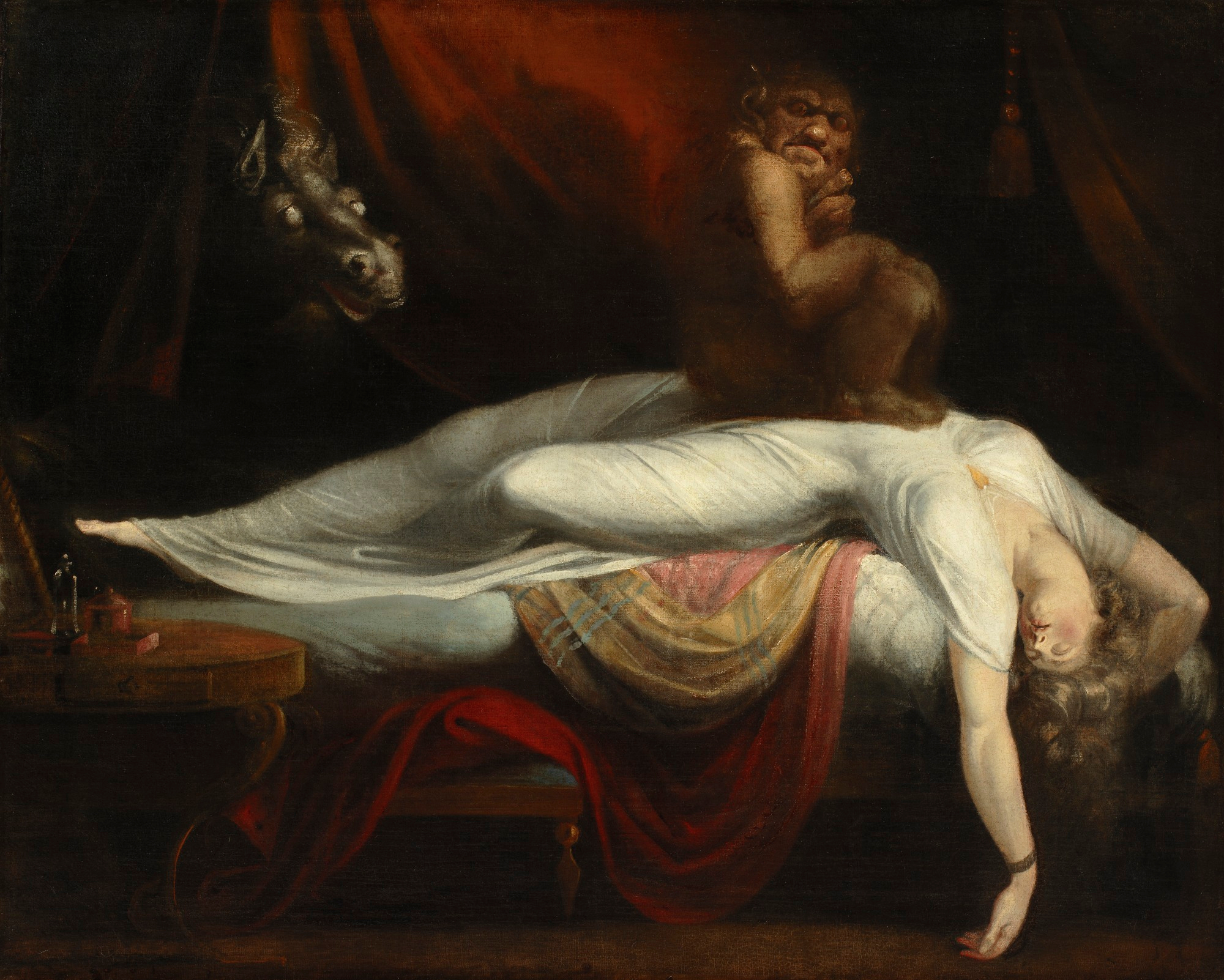
The Nightmare (1781), by Johann Heinrich Füssli, Detroit Institute of Arts, Detroit

Symbolism, understood as a means of expression of the "symbol", that is, of a type of content, whether written, sonorous or plastic, whose purpose is to transcend matter to signify a superior order of intangible elements, has always existed in art as a human manifestation, one of whose qualities has always been spiritual evocation and the search for a language that transcends reality. Thus, the presence of the symbol in art can be perceived as early as prehistoric cave painting and has been a constant, especially in art linked to religious beliefs, from Egyptian art or Aztec art to Christian art, Islamic art, Buddhist art or any of the multiple religions that have arisen throughout history. A symbolic background has been present in most modern artistic movements, such as the Renaissance, Mannerism, Baroque, Rococo or Romanticism. In general, these movements have been opposed to others that placed greater emphasis on the description of reality—a trend generally known as naturalism—such as academicism, Neoclassicism, realism or Impressionism.

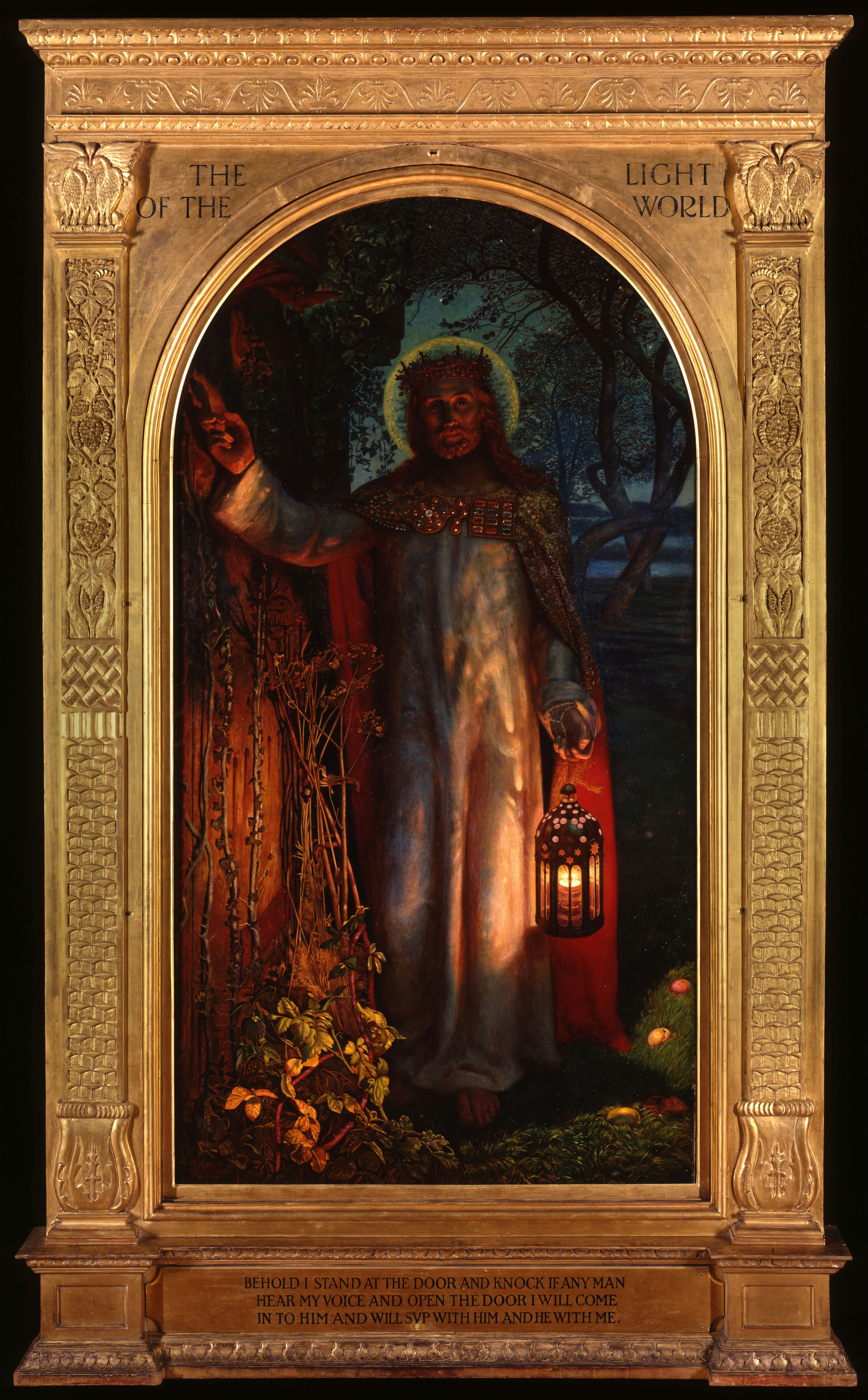
The Light of the World (1904), by William Holman Hunt, St Paul's Cathedral, London

Some Renaissance artists such as Botticelli and Mantegna exerted a great influence on the Symbolist painters: the former especially in England (Beardsley, Burne-Jones, Ricketts) and the latter in France with Moreau and Redon, and even Picasso. Other Renaissance artists who gave great relevance to the symbolic content of their works were Giorgione, Titian and Albrecht Dürer, who were also admired by the 19th century symbolists. A certain degree of symbolism is also seen in the work of Baroque artists such as Rubens and Claude Lorrain, as well as in a genre widely treated at this time, that of the vanitas, whose purpose is by definition always symbolic: to remind the viewer of the ephemerality of life and equality in the face of death. In the Rococo (18th century), a special reference for the Symbolists was Jean-Antoine Watteau, whose works moved away from the conventional symbolic allegory that had been prevalent in the Renaissance and Baroque to explore a more subtle and hidden symbolism, one that must be delved into to understand the artist's intentions and, therefore, closer to the Symbolist movement.

The closest roots of symbolism, already in the 19th century, are to be found in Romanticism and some of its offshoots, such as Nazarenism and Pre-Raphaelitism. Already in these movements some of the features of symbolism can be perceived, such as subjectivism, introspection, mysticism, lyrical evocation and attraction to the mysterious and the irrational. Romantic artists such as William Blake, Johann Heinrich Füssli, Caspar David Friedrich, Eugène Delacroix, Philipp Otto Runge, Moritz von Schwind or Ludwig Richter largely prelude the style developed by the Symbolist artists. Another precedent usually considered is Francisco de Goya, an artist somewhere between Rococo and Romanticism—rather an unclassifiable genius—who preluded Symbolism in works such as The Sleep of Reason Produces Monsters (1799, Museo del Prado, Madrid).

Romanticism was an innovative movement that was the first fracture against the main engine driving modern times: reason. According to Isaiah Berlin, there was "a shift of consciousness that split the backbone of European thought." For the Romantics, the objective world of the senses had no validity, so they turned to its antithesis: subjectivity. Artists turned to their inner world, it was their own temperament that dictated the rules and not society. Faced with academic rules, they gave primacy to the imagination, which would be the new vehicle of expression. All this is at the basis of Symbolist art, to the point that some experts consider it a part of the Romantic movement.

The immediate predecessor of Symbolism was Pre-Raphaelitism, a group of British artists who were inspired—as their name suggests—by Italian painters before Raphael, as well as by the newly emerging photography, with exponents such as Dante Gabriel Rossetti, John Everett Millais, William Holman Hunt, Ford Madox Brown and Edward Burne-Jones. Although his style is realistic, with images of great detail, bright colors and brilliant workmanship, his works are full of symbolic allusions, often of literary inspiration and with a moralizing tone, as well as a strong mysticism. His subject matter is often centered on medieval legends—especially the Arthurian cycle—the Renaissance world or shakespearean dramas. His aesthetic generally focuses on feminine beauty, a sensual but languid type of beauty, with a certain air of melancholy and idealization of the female figure.

=== Literary sources ===
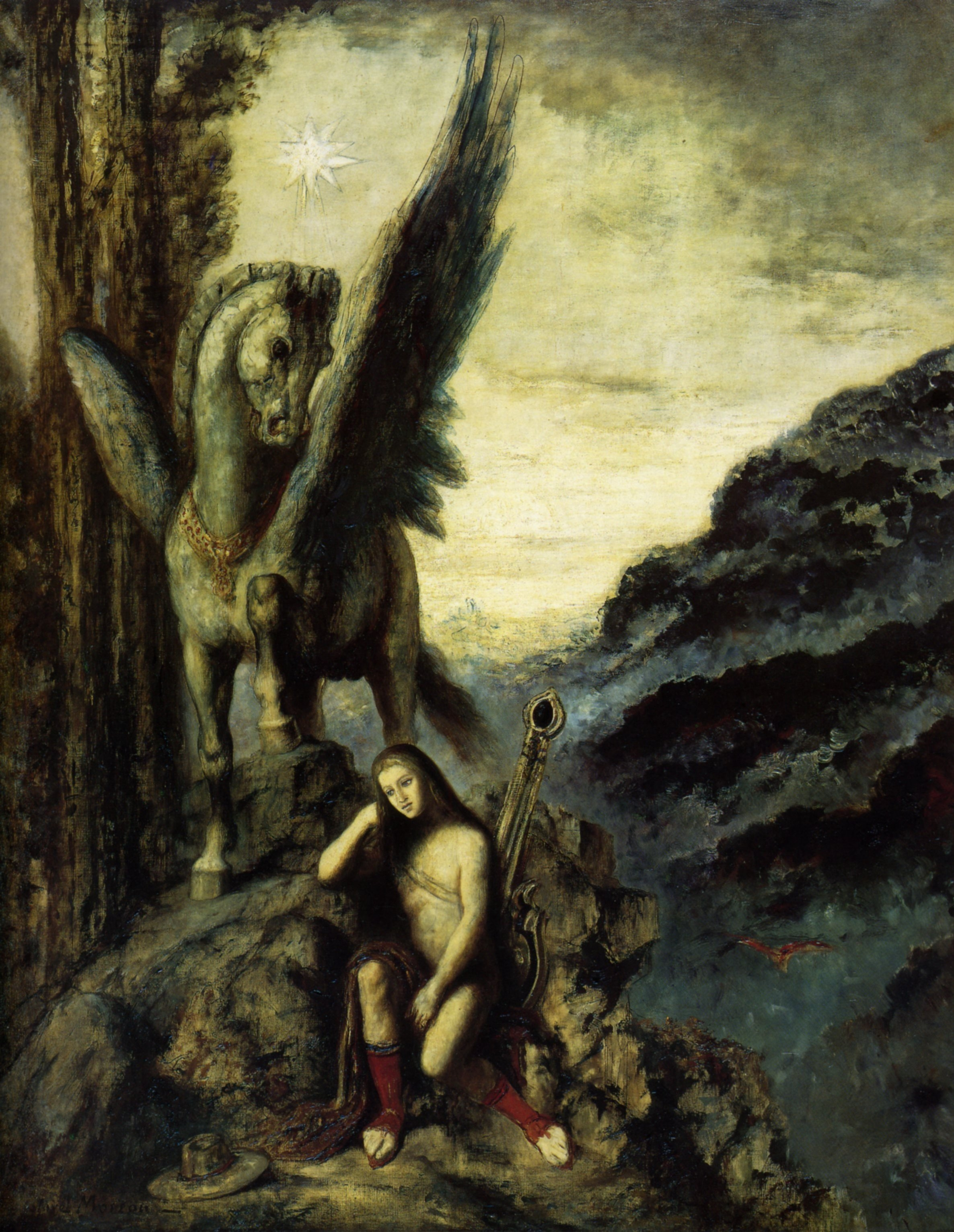
The Traveling Poet (1890), by Gustave Moreau, Gustave Moreau Museum, Paris

On September 18, 1886, Jean Moréas published in Le Figaro a literary manifesto in which he defined symbolism as "the enemy of teaching, declamation, false sensibility and objective description". According to Moréas, art was the analogical and concrete expression of the Idea, in which sensory and spiritual elements merge. For his part, the critic fr:Charles Morice defined symbolism as the synthesis between the spirit and the senses (La Littérature de tout à l'heure, 1889).

A literary antecedent of this movement was the book Against the Grain (À rebours) by Joris-Karl Huysmans (1884), a hymn to aestheticism and eccentricity as a vital attitude, in which he relates the work of certain artists such as Gustave Moreau, Rodolphe Bresdin and Odilon Redon to decadentism. In this novel the protagonist, Jean Floressas des Esseintes, withdraws from the world to live in an environment created by him in which he devotes himself to enjoying literature, music, art, flowers, jewels, perfumes, liquors and all those things that stimulate an idealized existence, removed from the mundane noise. As his title indicates, the character lives "against the grain of common sense, of moral sense, of reason, of nature." The protagonist fills his house with symbolist works of art, which he defines as "evocative works of art that will transport him to an unknown world, opening up new possibilities and agitating his nervous system by means of erudite fantasies, complicated nightmares and soft, sinister visions." This book was considered the "Bible of decadentism", the revelation of the fin de siècle feeling.

Symbolism was spread by numerous magazines such as La Revue wagnerienne (1885), Le Symbolisme (1886), La Plume (1889), La Revue blanche (1891) and, especially, La Pléiade (1886, renamed in 1889 as Mercure de France), which was the official organ of symbolism. In the latter magazine the critic Gabriel-Albert Aurier in 1891 defined Symbolist painting as idealist, symbolist, synthetist, subjective and decorative:

The work of art will be: 1. Idealist, for which its only ideal will be the expression of the idea. 2. Symbolist, for which it will express this idea by means of forms. 3. Synthetist, for which it will present these forms and these signs, according to a method that is comprehensible in general terms. 4. Subjective, for which the object will never be considered as an object but as a sign of an idea perceived by the object. 5.(Consequently it will be) decorative.

On the other hand, the poet Gustave Kahn noted in 1886 that:

The essential aim of our art is to objectify the subjective (the externalization of the idea) rather than to subjectify the objective (nature seen through the eyes of a temperament).

In the preface to his Livre des masques (1896), Remy de Gourmont wrote of symbolism:

What does symbolism mean? If we stick to the strict and etymological sense, almost nothing; if this limit is crossed, it can mean: individualism in literature, freedom of art, abandonment of taught formulas, tendency towards everything new, strange and even unusual; and it can also mean: idealism, disdain for social anecdote, anti-naturalism.

Symbolist painting was closely linked to literature, so that many of the works of the Symbolist literati served as inspiration for artists, especially Edgar Allan Poe, Charles Baudelaire, Gustave Flaubert, Gérard de Nerval, Arthur Rimbaud, Stéphane Mallarmé, Oscar Wilde, Maurice Maeterlinck, Stefan George, Rainer Maria Rilke, Richard Dehmel, Arthur Schnitzler and Hugo von Hofmannsthal.

Other literary referents of symbolism are found in the pessimistic philosophy of Arthur Schopenhauer, opposed to the positivism of Auguste Comte, and in the subjectivist philosophy of Henri Bergson and his advice to seek truth through intuition. Another philosophical reference was Friedrich Nietzsche.

Besides France, the other country that contributed intense baggage to the theory of symbolism was United Kingdom, the cradle of decadentism. Helping in that field were some articles by the critic and poet Arthur Symons in the magazine Savoy, author of the essay The Symbolist Movement in Literature (1900), where he advocated symbolism as an attempt to spiritualize art and turn it into a religion that would substitute nature for fantasy.

=== Aestheticism ===
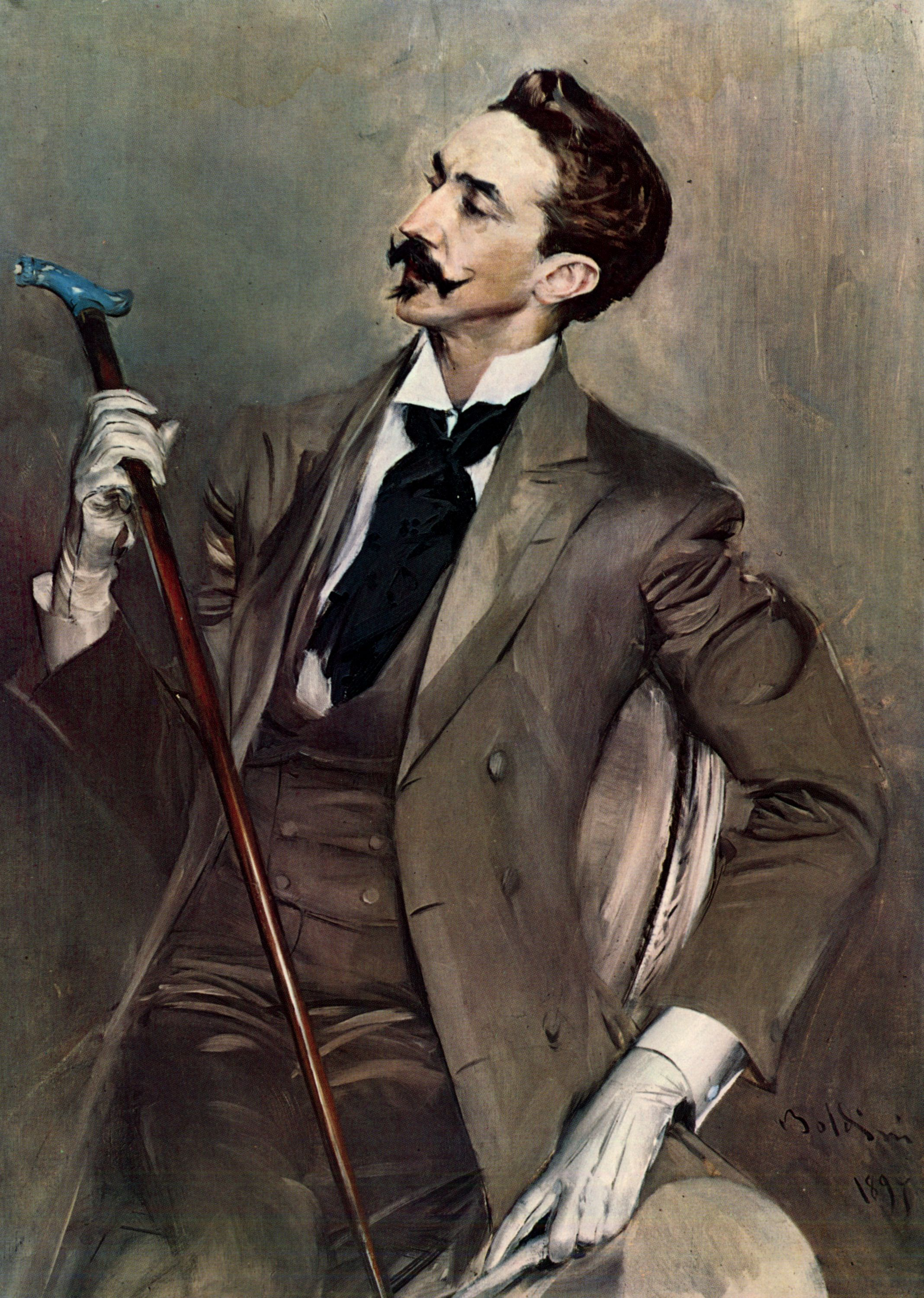
Portrait of Count Robert de Montesquiou (1897), by Giovanni Boldini, Musée d'Orsay, Paris. Prototype of the dandy, the Count de Montesquiou was probably the model for the character Jean Floressas des Esseintes of the book Against the Grain by Joris-Karl Huysmans (1884)

Symbolism was closely linked to aestheticism, a philosophical-artistic movement which, against the materialism of the industrial era, opposed the exaltation of art and beauty, synthesized in Théophile Gautier's formula of "art for art's sake" (l'art pour l'art'), which was even referred to as "aesthetic religion". This position sought to isolate the artist from society, to seek his own inspiration autonomously and to be driven solely by an individual quest for beauty. Beauty was removed from any moral component, becoming the ultimate goal of the artist, who came to live his own life as a work of art-as can be seen in the figure of the dandy. For aesthetes, art should have no didactic, moral, social or political function, but should respond solely to pleasure and beauty.

This movement arose in the United Kingdom, cradle of the Industrial Revolution, where in the first half of the 19th century artistic styles—especially in architecture and decorative arts—of eclectic cut such as historicism developed. Against this, an "Aesthetic Discontent" began to emerge, which provoked a reaction towards more natural and handcrafted forms, as seen in the Arts & Crafts movement, which led to a revaluation of the decorative arts. All this led to the so-called "Aesthetic Movement", led by John Ruskin, who defended the dignity of craftsmanship and a conception of art aimed at beauty. Ruskin advocated a gospel of beauty, in which art is consubstantial with life, it is a basic necessity that makes human beings rise from their animal condition; rather than an embellishment of life, art is life itself.

Another theorist of the movement was Walter Pater, who established in his works that the artist must live life intensely, following beauty as an ideal. For Pater, art is "the magic circle of existence", an isolated and autonomous world placed at the service of pleasure, elaborating an authentic metaphysics of beauty. Subsequently, authors such as James Abbott McNeill Whistler, Oscar Wilde, Algernon Charles Swinburne and Stéphane Mallarmé developed this tendency to a high degree of refinement based solely on the artist's sensibility.

In France, Théophile Gautier turned a quotation from Victor Cousin's Course de philosophie into the motto l'art pour l'art, which was the workhorse of aestheticism. This phrase synthesized the belief in the absolute autonomy of art, which dispenses with any moral or ideological conditioning to express the idea of beauty as the ultimate goal of the artist. Thus, symbolist poetry is based on preciosity and sensuality, on lyrical effects that sparkle like precious stones, and art seeks the suggestiveness of the image, the richness of the symbol, the sensual aesthetic that they draw even from elements such as vice and perversion, which are refined to achieve an image of strong visual impact.

A parallel phenomenon to aestheticism was dandyism, in which the cult of beauty is carried over to one's own body: dandies wear elegant clothes, are overly concerned with their personal image, are interested in fashion and seek to keep up with the latest fashions in dress; they are fond of accessories, such as hats, gloves and walking sticks. In general, they are urban characters, of bourgeois origin—although sometimes they renounce this distinction—often with liberal professions and fond of technological novelties. In terms of character, they tended to be haughty and confrontational, and liked to be admired and even regarded as celebrities. As a phenomenon that emerged in the United Kingdom, the dandies are children of Victorian morality, and although they rebel against it, they do so from a passive attitude, reduced to insolence, sarcasm and skepticism. They disdain vulgarity and focus on pleasure, whether physical or intellectual.

=== Decadentism ===
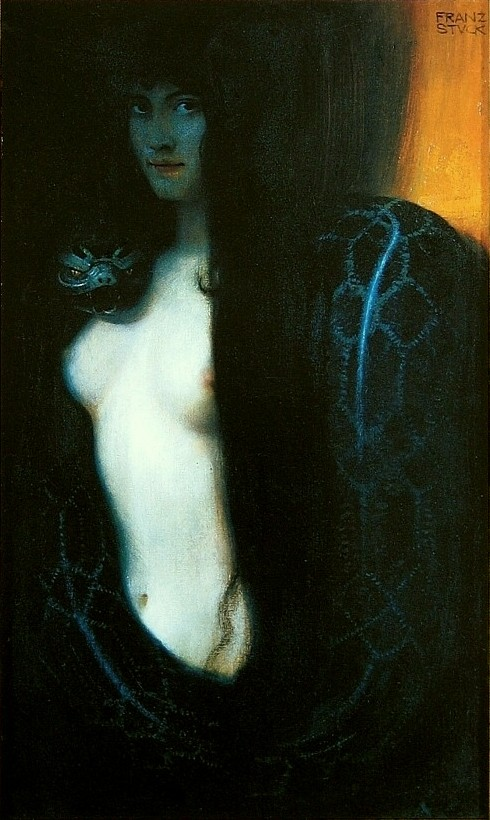
The Sin (1893), by Franz von Stuck, Neue Pinakothek, Munich.

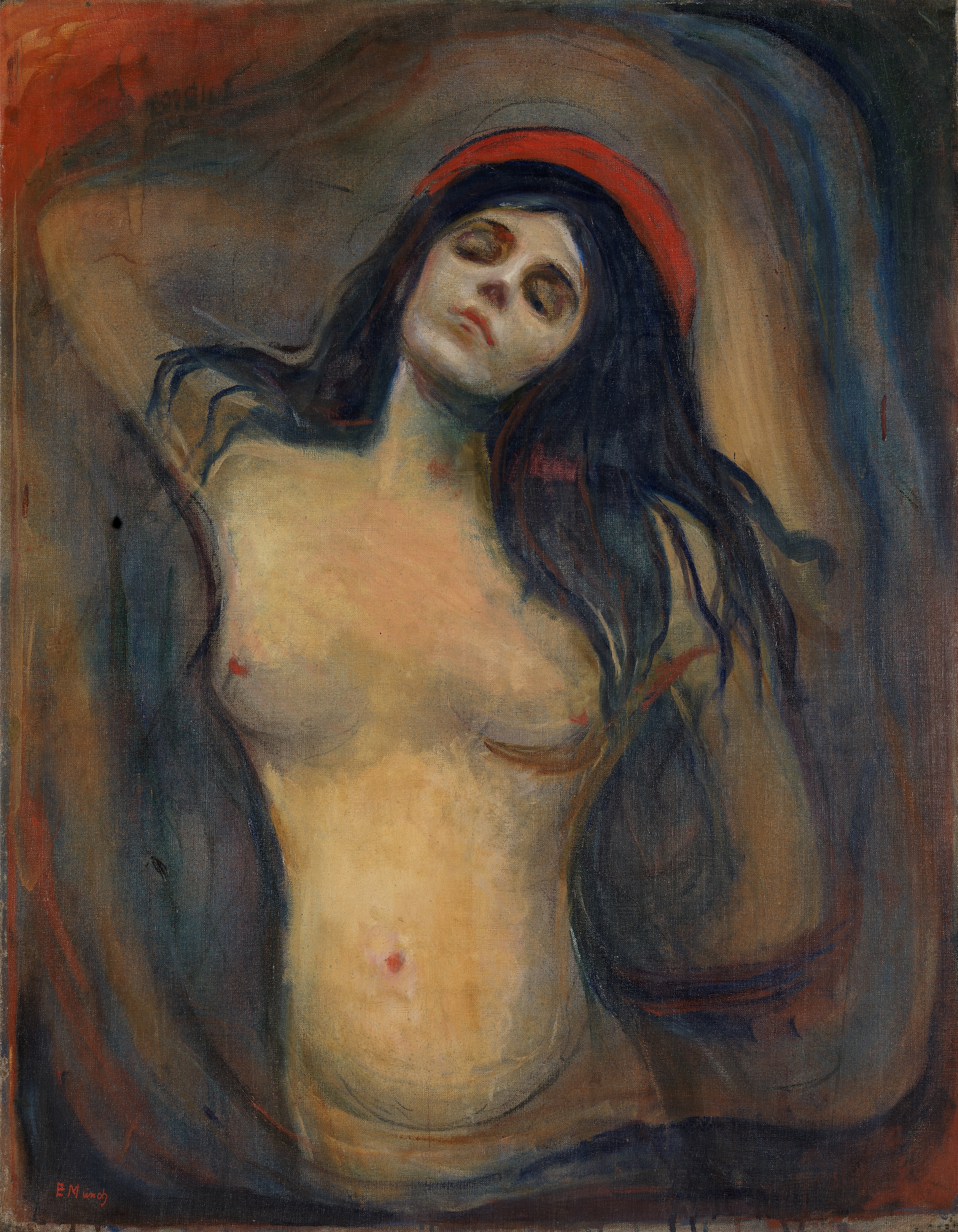
Madonna (1894–1895), by Edvard Munch, National Gallery of Norway, Oslo

The writer Thomas Mann, in his novel Gladius Dei (1902), interweaved these two images to forge the prototype of the sinful woman.

Decadentism was a fin-de-siecular current perceptible both in art and in literature, music and other cultural manifestations, which emphasized the most existential aspects of life and society, with a pessimistic attitude derived from the philosophy of Schopenhauer and Kierkegaard, and a rebellious and anti-social attitude inspired by works such as The Flowers of Evil by Baudelaire and Against the Grain by Huysmans. Their general characteristics are a taste for elegance and fantasy, as well as for the exotic—which is denoted in their predilection for orchids, butterflies or peacocks—a predilection for artificial beauty, while denigrating nature; a romantic vision of evil and the occult sciences; a certain tendency towards the grotesque and the sensational, and a taste for the morbid and perverse; a rejection of conventional morality; and a dramatic conception of life.

Romantic sensibility was carried to exaggeration, especially in the taste for the morbid and terrifying, and an "aesthetic of evil" emerged, appreciable in the attraction to satanism, magic and paranormal phenomena, or the fascination with vice and sexual deviance. Symbolist art overexcites the senses, which produces a sense of decadence, which will be the state of mind characteristic of the fin de siècle. Paul Verlaine wrote:

I like the word "decadentism". It has a glow of gold and purple. It gives off beams of fire and the glitter of precious stones.

Since 1886 a magazine entitled Le Décadent was published in France, which was in a way the official organ of this movement. In its first issue, on April 10, 1886, it announced to society the decadence of values such as morality, religion and justice, and pointed out symptoms of the process of social involution such as history, neurosis, hypnotism and drug dependence. Decadentism was an anti-bourgeois and anti-naturalist movement, which defended luxury, pleasure and hypersensitivity of taste. On the theoretical level, it drew on the work of thinkers and philosophers such as Friedrich Nietzsche, who pointed to the symbol as the basis of art; Henri Bergson, who opposed objective reality and defended its subjective perception; and Arthur Schopenhauer, whose book The World as Will and Representation (1819) powerfully influenced fin-de-siècle pessimism.

One of the characteristics of decadentism is the dark attraction to the perverse woman, the femme fatale, the Eve turned Lilith, the enigmatic and distant, disturbing woman, the woman that Manuel Machado defined as brittle, vicious, and mystical, pre-Raphaelite virgin and Parisian cat. She is a woman loved and hated, adored and reviled, exalted and repudiated, virtuous and sinful, who will adopt numerous symbolic and allegorical forms, such as sphinx, mermaid, chimera, medusa, winged genie, etc. A type of artificial and androgynous, ambiguous beauty became fashionable, a type of leonardesque beauty, with undefined features, which will have a symbolic equivalent in flowers such as the lily or animals such as the swan and the peacock. Symbolists often portrayed characters such as Eve, Salome, Judith, Messalina or Cleopatra, prototypes of femme fatale, of the vampiric female who turned female sexuality into a dangerous and mysterious power, often associated with sin, as glimpsed in the allegory of Franz von Stuck's Sin (1893, Neue Pinakothek, Munich). Some of the women of the period who served as references for symbolist and modernist artists were the dancers Cléo de Mérode, La Bella Otero and Loïe Fuller, as well as the actress Sarah Bernhardt.

=== Dissemination and legacy ===
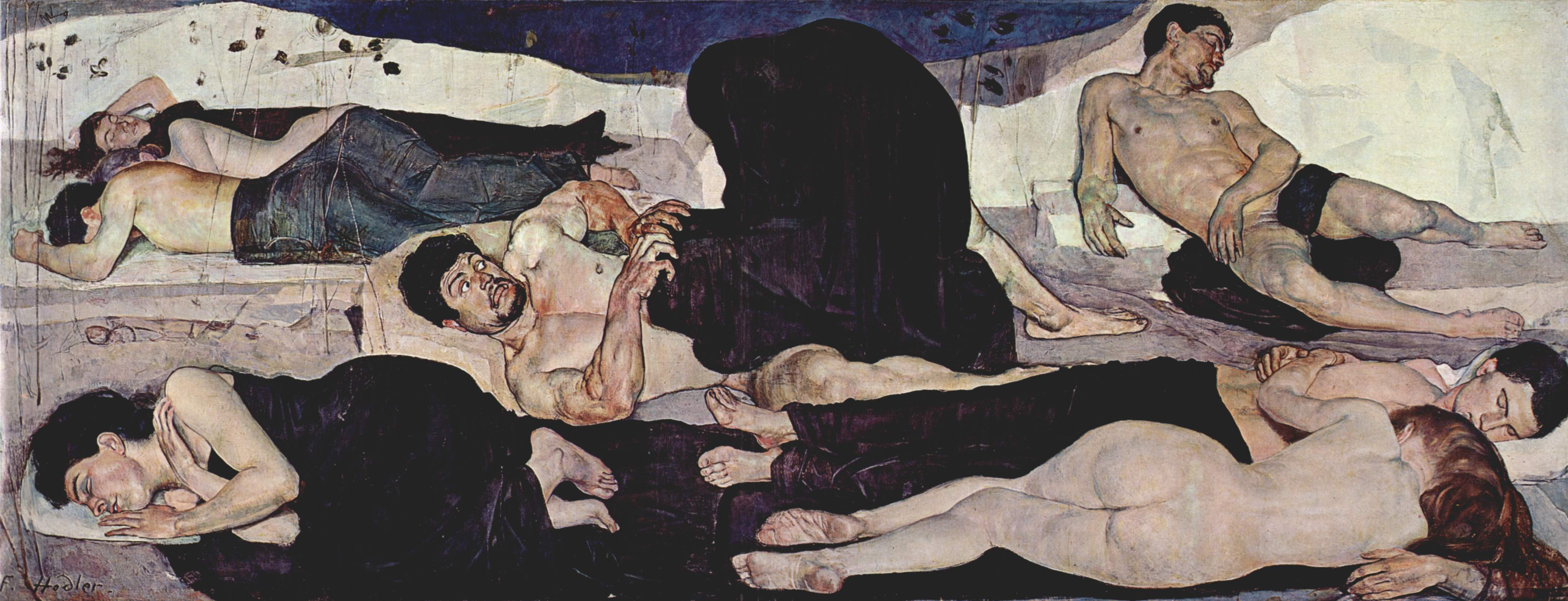
Night (1889–1890), by Ferdinand Hodler, Museum of Fine Arts Bern

Fin-de-siecle art—symbolism, modernism—relied on a series of increasingly diverse media for its dissemination, thanks to technological advances and the ever-increasing speed of communications. The new art relied on a variety of propagandistic media such as magazines, exhibitions, galleries, advertising posters, illustrated books, production workshops and artists' societies, private schools and academies and other types of promotion and sales channels. The speed of dissemination and reproduction led to both the cosmopolitization of the new style and a certain vulgarization of it: the replicas of Symbolist works of art led to their devaluation to a certain kitsch taste, and the attempt to find a new language far removed from the crude bourgeois aesthetic sometimes degenerated into a poor substitute for it.

Symbolism influenced several contemporary movements, such as modernism and naïve art, as well as several of the early "isms" of avant-garde art, such as Fauvism, expressionism, futurism, surrealism and even abstract art: some of the pioneers of abstraction, such as Kandinsky, Malevich, Mondrian and Kupka, had a symbolist phase at the beginning of their work. Fauvist coloring was heir to symbolism, cloisonnism and synthetism, in an evolutionary line that begins with the smooth color without shadows of Puvis de Chavannes, continues with the enameled color and enclosed in black contours of Émile Bernard, color that Gauguin took to its maximum expression and was transmitted by Sérusier to the Nabis; the leading exponent of Fauvism, Henri Matisse, revealed that his painting Luxury I was inspired by Girls by the Sea by Puvis de Chavannes. Expressionism considered artists such as Paul Gauguin, Edvard Munch or James Ensor as immediate antecedents, and some expressionist artists had an early symbolist phase, such as Georges Rouault, Alfred Kubin, Egon Schiele, Oskar Kokoschka, Franz Marc and Vasili Kandinsky. Futurism, although theoretically opposed to symbolism, received its influence to a large extent, especially thanks to the work of Gaetano Previati; Futurist artists such as Umberto Boccioni, Giacomo Balla and Carlo Carrà were close to symbolism in their early work, as well as Giorgio de Chirico, the greatest exponent of metaphysical painting. For its part, surrelism was influenced by artists such as Odilon Redon, William Degouve de Nuncques and Alberto Martini, whose mark can be perceived in artists such as Paul Delvaux, René Magritte, Paul Klee or Salvador Dalí.

== France ==
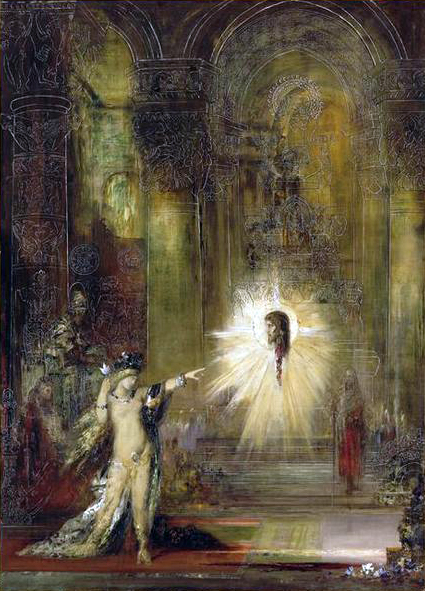
L'Apparition (1874–1876), by Gustave Moreau, Gustave Moreau Museum, Paris

France was the cradle of symbolism in painting, in poetry, and in other artistic genres. Gustave Moreau can be considered the father of pictorial symbolism; in any case, his work predates the emergence of "official" symbolism by two decades, since from the 1860s Moreau was already painting pictures in which he recreated his particular world of luxurious and detailed fantasy, with themes based on mythology, history and the Bible, with a special predilection for fatal characters such as Salome. Moreau was still trained in Romanticism under the influence of his teacher, Théodore Chassériau, but evolved to a personal style in both subject matter and technique, with images of mystical cut with a strong component of sensuality, a resplendent chromaticism with an enamel-like finish and the use of a chiaroscuro of golden shadows. He was influenced by artists such as Leonardo, Mantegna and Delacroix, as well as Indian art, Byzantine art and Greco-Roman mosaic. His works are of fantastic cut and ornamental style, with variegated compositions densely populated with all kinds of objects and vegetal elements, with a suggestive eroticism that reflects his fears and obsessions, in which he portrays a prototype of ambiguous woman, between innocence and perversity: Oedipus and the Sphinx (1864, Metropolitan Museum of Art, New York), Orpheus (1865, Louvre Museum, Paris), Jason and Medea (1865, Musée d'Orsay, Paris), Diomedes devoured by his horses (1870, Musée des Beaux-Arts de Rouen), The Apparition (1874–1876, Gustave Moreau Museum, Paris), Salome (1876, Gustave Moreau Museum, Paris), Hercules and the Hydra of Lerna (1876, Art Institute of Chicago), Cleopatra (1887, Louvre Museum, Paris), Jupiter and Semele (1894–1896, Gustave Moreau Museum, Paris). He lived almost in seclusion in his house in the Parisian Rue de Rochefoucauld—now the Musée Moreau—where he produced some 850 paintings, in addition to drawings and watercolors. Moreau was a teacher of Henri Matisse, Albert Marquet and Georges Rouault, among others.

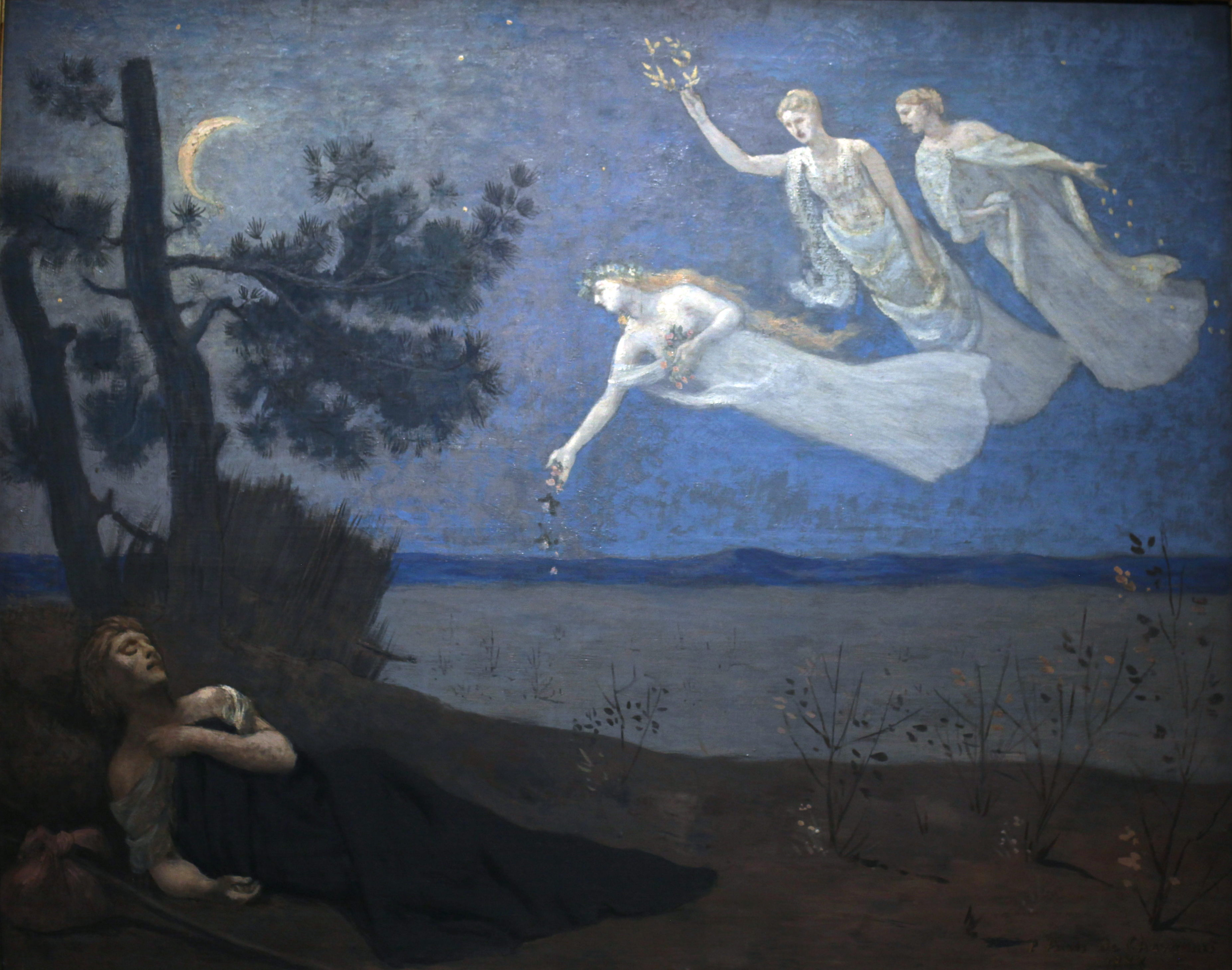
The Dream (1883), by Pierre Puvis de Chavannes, Musée du Louvre, Paris

Another avant-la-lettre reference was Pierre Puvis de Chavannes, a singular painter whose style differs completely from Moreau's baroque symbolism, a classical and serene style that would have been classified as academicist if it were not for the choice of his subjects, where the recourse to symbol and allegory as a means of conveying the message is indeed appreciated. He was an outstanding muralista, a procedure that suited him well to develop his preference for cold tones, which gave the appearance of fresco painting. He had a more serene and harmonious style, with an allegorical theme of evocation of an idealized past, simple forms, rhythmic lines and a subjective coloring, alien to naturalism. In his youth he briefly passed through the workshops of Delacroix, Coutoure and Chassériau and made two trips to Italy, but perhaps most transcendent for the formation of his serene and restful style was his relationship with the Greek princess Maria Cantacuzeno, who transmitted her intense spirituality to him. In 1861, with the allegories of War and Peace (Municipal Museum of Amiens) he began his muralist work, for which he received numerous commissions throughout France and which would make him famous. He painted murals in the town halls of Paris and Poitiers, the Panthéon, the Sorbonne and the Boston Public Library, among others. His monumental style was based on the absence of depth, constructive linearity and compositional majesty, as well as the philosophical reflection inherent in his scenes. In 1890 he founded with Rodin, Carrière and Meissonnier the Société Nationale des Beaux Arts, which organized various exhibitions of young artists and new trends until 1910.

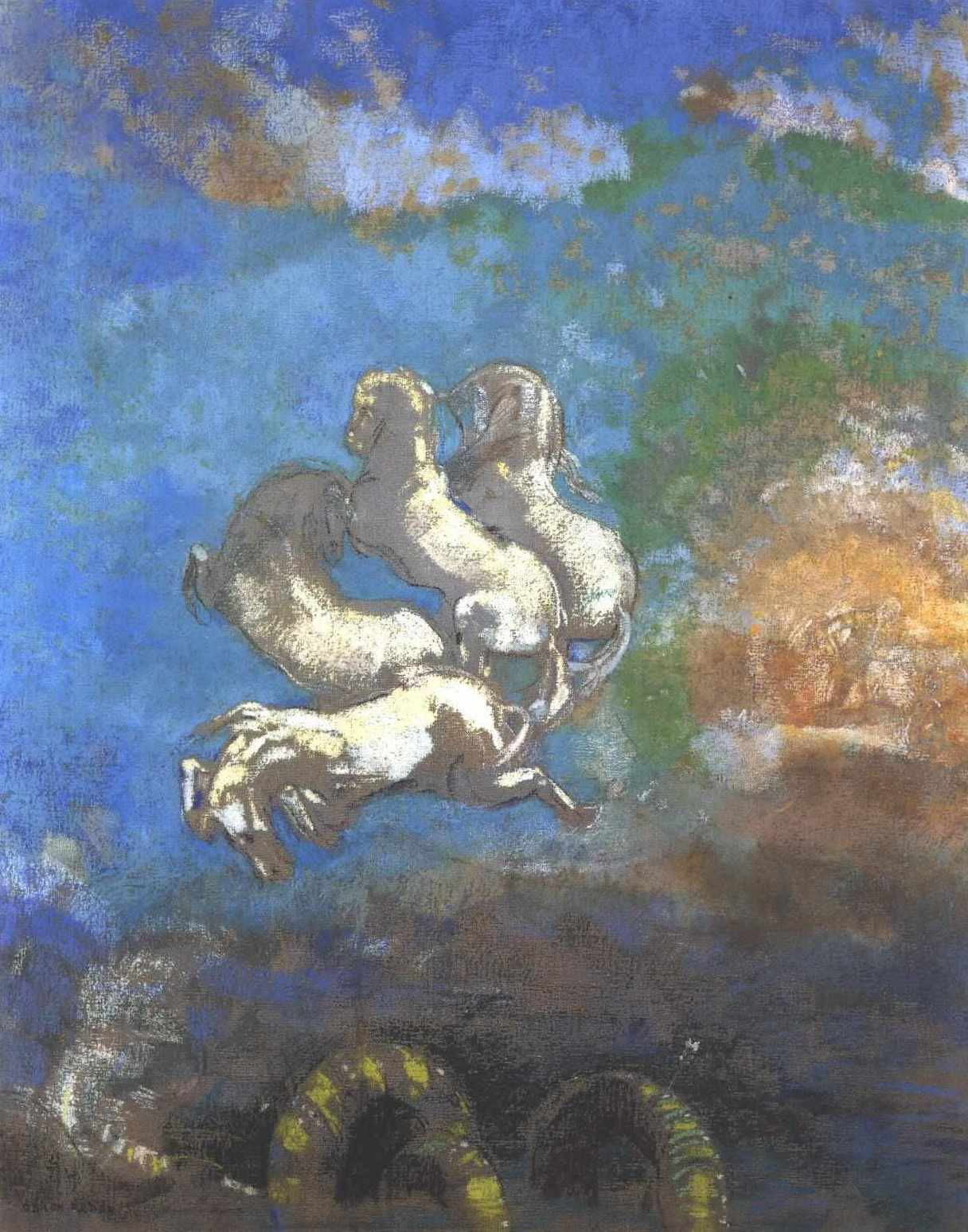
The Chariot of Apollo (1905–1914), by Odilon Redon, Musée d'Orsay, Paris

Odilon Redon was a pupil of Stanislas Gorin, Jean-Léon Gérôme, Rodolphe Bresdin and Henri Fantin-Latour. He developed a fantastic and dreamlike subject matter, influenced by the literature of Edgar Allan Poe, which largely preceded surrealism. Until the age of fifty he worked almost exclusively in charcoal drawing and lithography, although he later showed himself to be an excellent colorist in both oil and pastel, with a style based on soft drawing and phosphorescent-looking coloring. He was influenced by artists such as Holbein, Dürer, Bosch, Rembrandt, Goya, Delacroix and Corot. Scientific materialism also exerted a powerful influence on his work: he studied anatomy, osteology and zoology, knowledge that is reflected in his work; hence his preference for heads with closed eyes, resembling protozoans. Redon illustrated numerous works by symbolist writers, such as Edgar Allan Poe or The Temptation of Saint Anthony by Gustave Flaubert (1886). In 1884 he founded the Société des Artistes Indépendants.

Alphonse Osbert studied at the École nationale supérieure des beaux-arts in Paris, where he was a disciple of Henri Lehmann, Léon Bonnat and Fernand Cormon. His first stylistic reference was the Spanish Baroque, especially José de Ribera. He was also influenced by Georges Seurat and Pierre Puvis de Chavannes. Through his friend the critic Henry Degron he entered the circle of Maurice Denis and the Nabis, and assiduously attended the salons of the Rosicrucians. Osbert's production focused on a type of bucolic and dreamlike landscapes of ethereal tones, with a preference for blue and mauve, populated by female figures in motionless, contemplative attitude. On most occasions these figures allude to the Muses, dressed in vaporous veils and framed in idyllic landscapes, generally with a twilight setting.

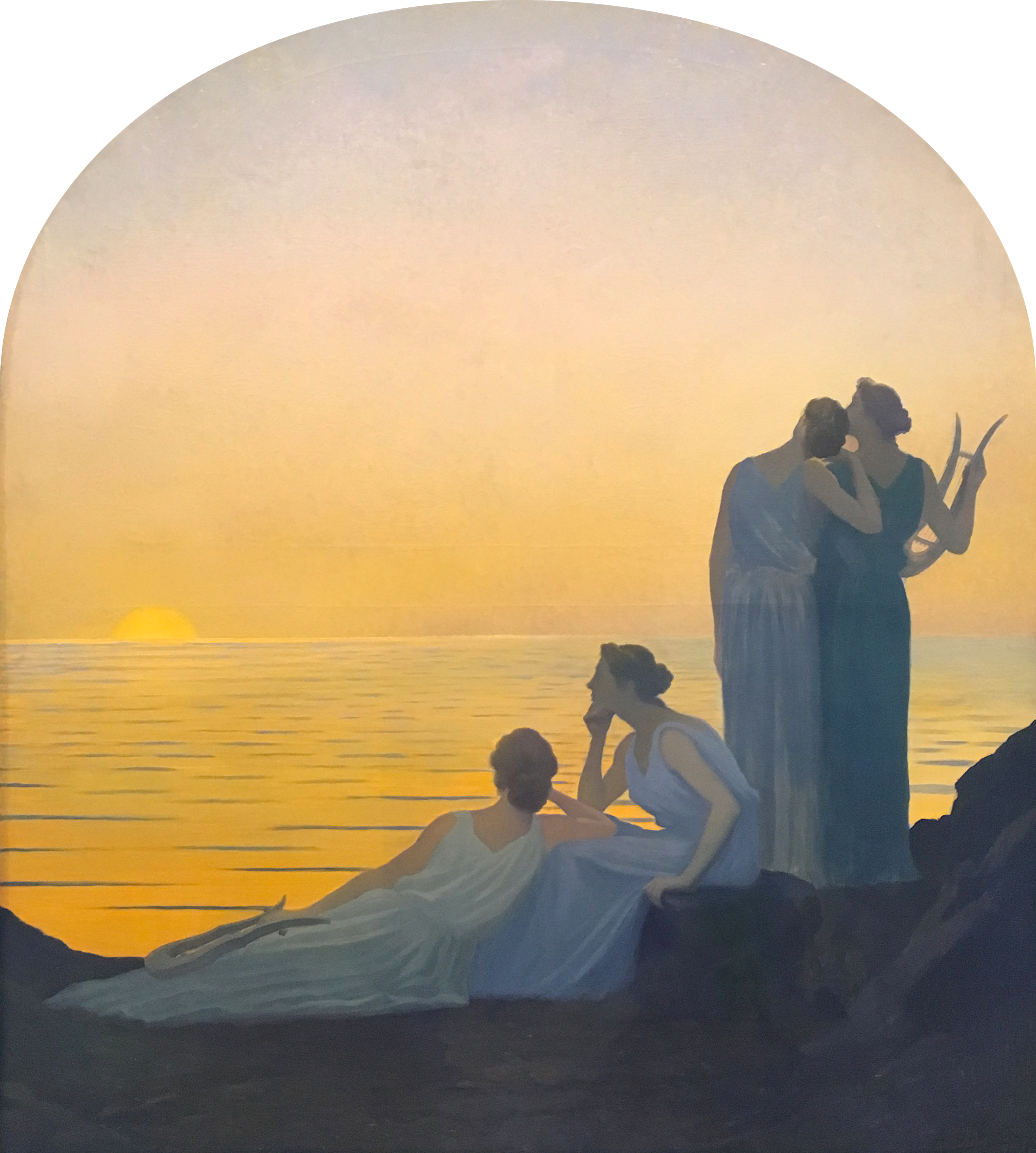
An Evening in Ancient Times (1908), by Alphonse Osbert, Petit Palais, Paris

Eugène Carrière started as a lithographer before studying at the École des Beaux-Arts, where he was a student of Alexandre Cabanel. In 1890 he founded with Puvis de Chavannes the Société Nationale des Beaux Arts, where he exhibited regularly. Realist in style, his subject matter delved into symbolism thanks to his interest in emotional suggestion, with a velaturas technique of gray and brown tones that would be characteristic of his production. His subject matter focused preferably on domestic scenes, with a special interest in mother-child relationships. One of his hallmarks was to envelop the figures in a yellowish mist, like limbs, an effect that isolates the figures and separates them from the viewer, with the aim of emphasizing their essence.

Henri Fantin-Latour was a painter of a rather realistic style, as denoted by his portraits and still lifes inspired by Chardin. However, his compositions inspired by musical themes-especially by Wagner, Schumann and Berlioz-have a strong symbolist component, in compositions in which he recreates fantastic worlds populated by Pre-Raphaelite-looking nymphs.

Lucien Lévy-Dhurmer was an academic painter who synthesized Impressionist technique with Symbolist themes, especially in his fantastic scenes; he was also a portraitist and landscape painter. In his work stands out the chromatic harmony and the idealization of the represented subjects, in which the influence of the music of Beethoven, Fauré and Debussy is denoted.

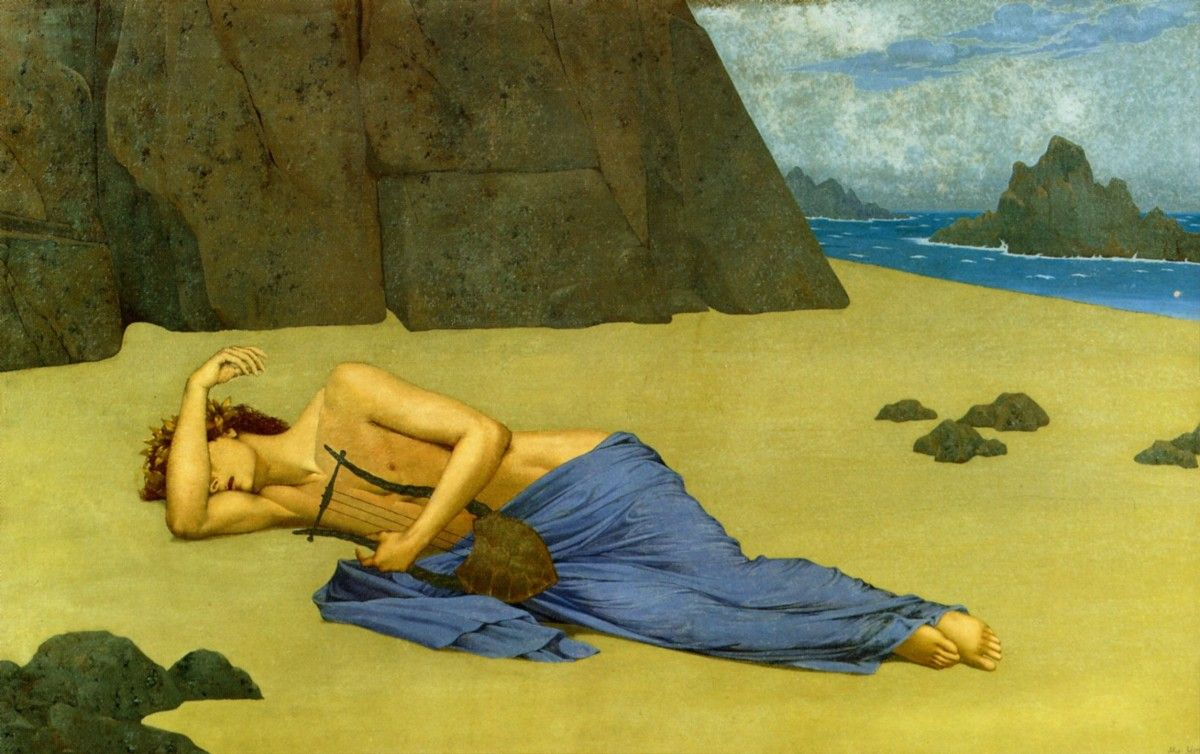
The lament of Orpheus (1896), by Alexandre Séon, Musée d'Orsay, Paris

Alexandre Séon was an illustrator and decorator, the most talented of Puvis de Chavannes' disciples. He was the founder with Péladan and Antoine de la Rochefoucauld of the Salon de la Rose+Croix. In 1891 he painted a portrait of Péladan with a Babylonian appearance. One of his finest works is Lament of Orpheus (1896, Musée d'Orsay, Paris).

Edgar Maxence was a disciple of Moreau and exhibited regularly at the Salon de la Rose+Croix. His work shows a strong idealism, with often medieval-inspired subject matter and pictures in which he combines painting with sculpted elements. From 1900 his style became more decorativist, thereby losing in symbolic essence.

Edmond Aman-Jean was a pupil of Lehmann at the École des Beaux-Arts, where he met Georges Seurat, whom he befriended; he was also friends with Mallarmé and Péladan. Of academicist style, he is considered the most "gallant" of the French symbolists. He collaborated with Puvis de Chavannes in his mural Sacred forest. He participated in the exhibitions of the Rosicrucians and designed the poster for the one of 1893. He received the Pre-Raphaelite influence, which is denoted in his contours in arabesque, with a chromaticism of soft and matte tones. He was especially devoted to female portraiture, with figures of delicate movements in sad and bored attitude, of reverie and self-absorption.

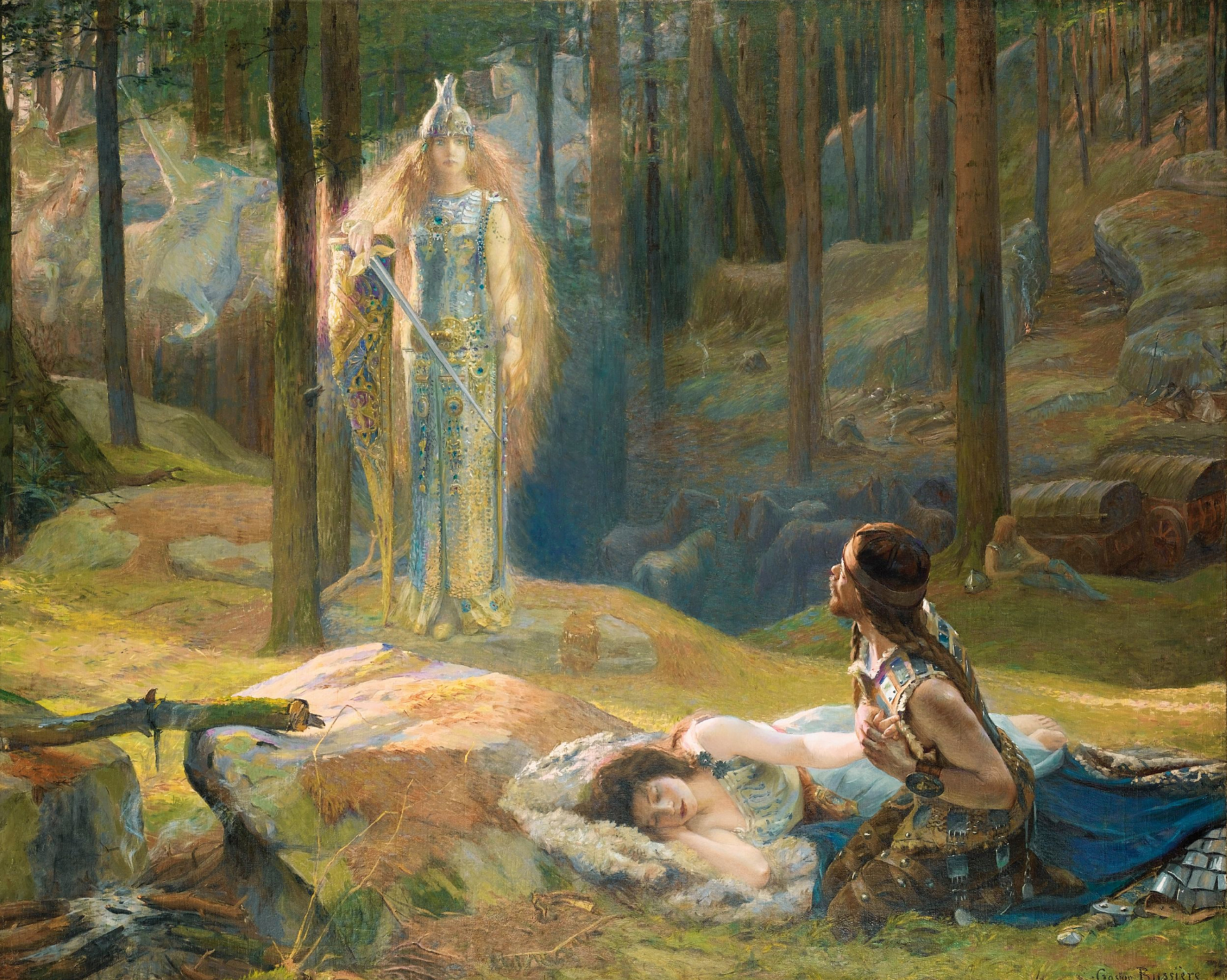
The Revelation (1894), by Gaston Bussière, Musée Thomas-Henry, Cherbourg-en-Cotentin

Gaston Bussière studied at the École des Beaux-Arts in Paris with Alexandre Cabanel and Pierre Puvis de Chavannes. Influenced by Gustave Moreau, he was also inspired by the music of Berlioz and Wagner and the literature of William Shakespeare. He exhibited several times at the Salon de la Rose+Croix. He excelled as an illustrator of books, such as Splendors and Miseries of Courtesans by Honoré de Balzac, Enamels and Cameos by Théophile Gautier, Salome by Oscar Wilde and several works by Gustave Flaubert.

Gustav-Adolf Mossa was a late Symbolist, influenced by Moreau, Pre-Raphaelitism and the Renaissance painters of the Quattrocento. His work shows the influence of writers such as Mallarmé, Baudelaire and Huysmans. As in many of his co-religionists, his subject matter focused on numerous occasions on the figure of the femme fatale, whom he considered dangerous and corrupt. His style was ornate drawing, sometimes caricatured, dramatic in tone and psychological introspection.

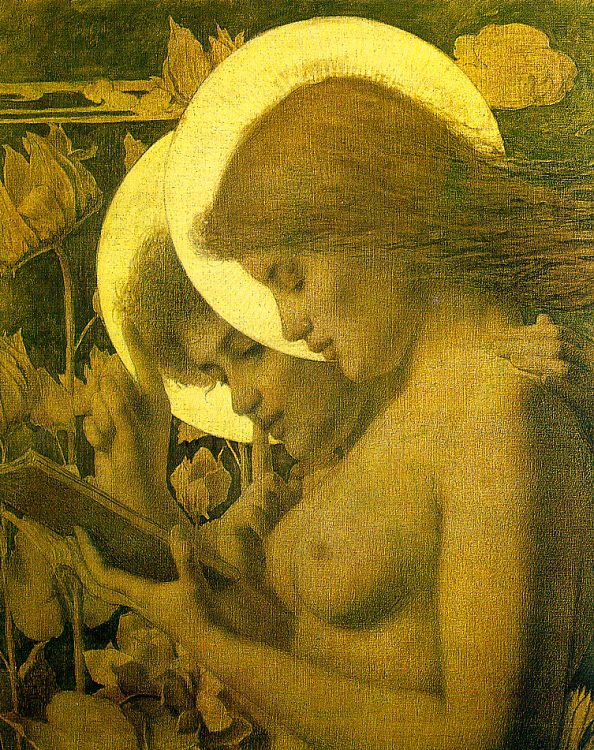
Les Auréoles (Haloes) (1894), by Louis Welden Hawkins, private collection, Paris

Georges de Feure was a painter, set designer and art dealer. His style was very decorativist and he devoted himself mainly to the production of theatrical posters. He developed a type of fashionable image of women that was very successful in the belle époque. He was also an author of watercolors, which he exhibited at the Salon de la Rose+Croix.

Louis Welden Hawkins was born in Germany to an English father and Austrian mother, but lived from childhood in France. He studied at the Académie Julian. His dense and meticulous technique brings him closer to Pre-Raphaelitism than to Symbolism, but he moved in the Symbolist environment, maintaining contacts with writers such as Mallarmé, Jean Lorrain and Robert de Montesquiou, and exhibiting at the Salon des Artistes Français, the Société Nationale, the Salon de la Rose+Croix and the Libre Estéthique in Brussels.

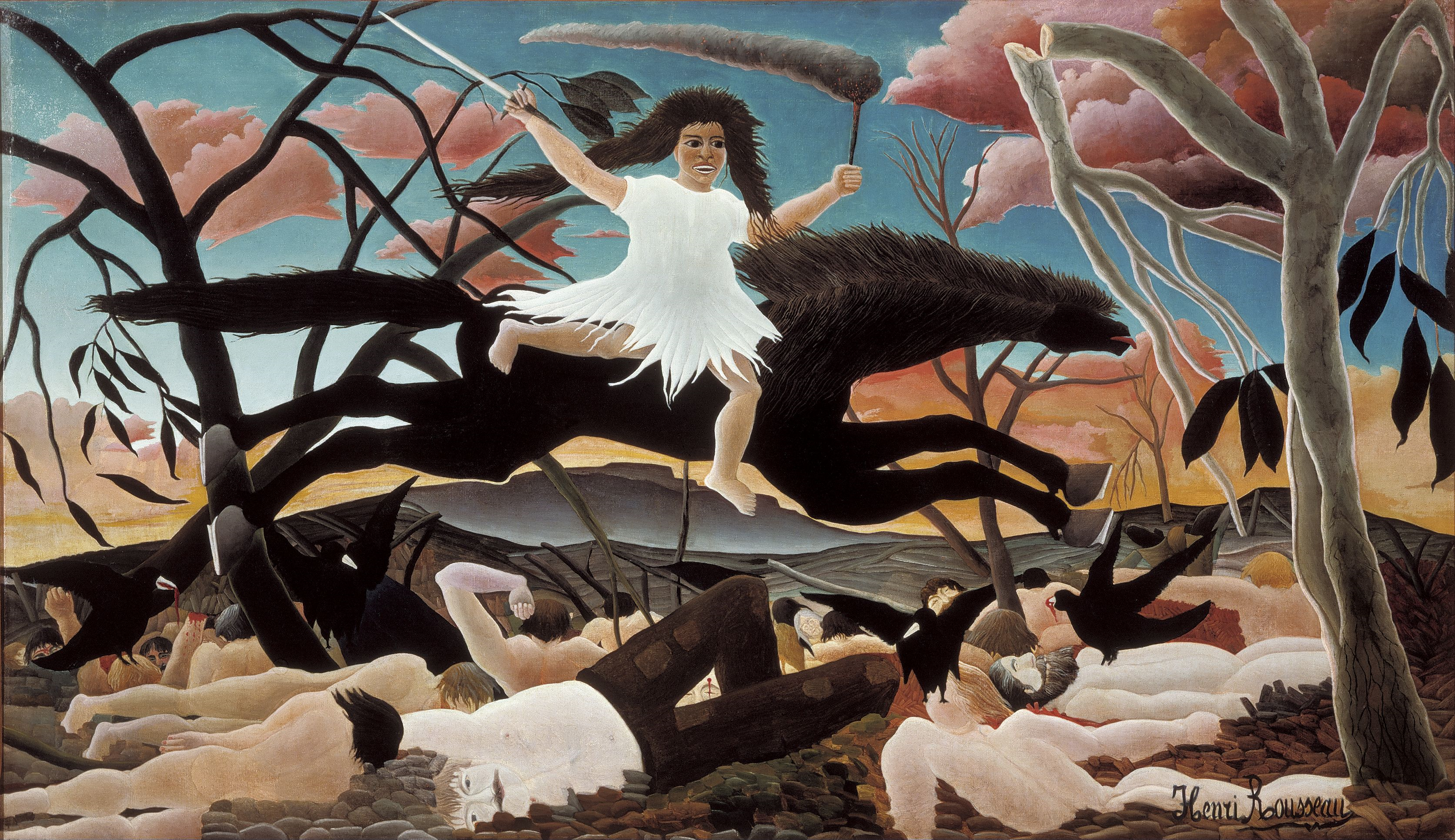
War (1894), by Henri Rousseau, Musée d'Orsay, Paris

Georges Rouault was a student of Gustave Moreau, of whose museum he was curator from 1903. Influenced by his master, his first works were symbolist, although he later switched to Fauvism and expressionism. His Symbolist phase is characterized by a fiery luminosity—with a predilection for nocturnal environments—and an evocative and symbolic chromaticism (Jesus among the Doctors, 1894, Unterlinden Museum, Colmar; The Mirror, 1906, Musée National d'Art Moderne, Paris). In his work the presence of grotesque-looking characters is frequent, generally judges, clowns and prostitutes.

Other exponents of French symbolism were George Desvallières, Marcellin Desboutin, Charles Dulac, Charles-Auguste Sellier, Georges Lacombe and Antonio de la Gándara.

Finally, it is worth mentioning an artist outside the Symbolist movement but whose style has a certain link with it: Henri Rousseau, maximum representative of the so-called Naïve art, a term applied to a series of self-taught painters who developed a spontaneous style, alien to the technical and aesthetic principles of traditional painting, sometimes branded as childish or primitive. Rousseau, a customs officer by trade, developed a personal work, with a poetic tone and a taste for the exotic, in which he lost interest in perspective and resorted to unreal-looking lighting, without shadows or perceptible light sources, a type of imagery that influenced artists such as Picasso or Kandinski and movements such as metaphysical painting and Surrealism. Rousseau's work was highly valued by Symbolist artists such as Redon and Gauguin, especially for its coloring, which they noted transcended a "mythical essence". One of Rousseau's works closest to Symbolism was War (1894, Musée d'Orsay, Paris).

=== Pont-Aven School ===
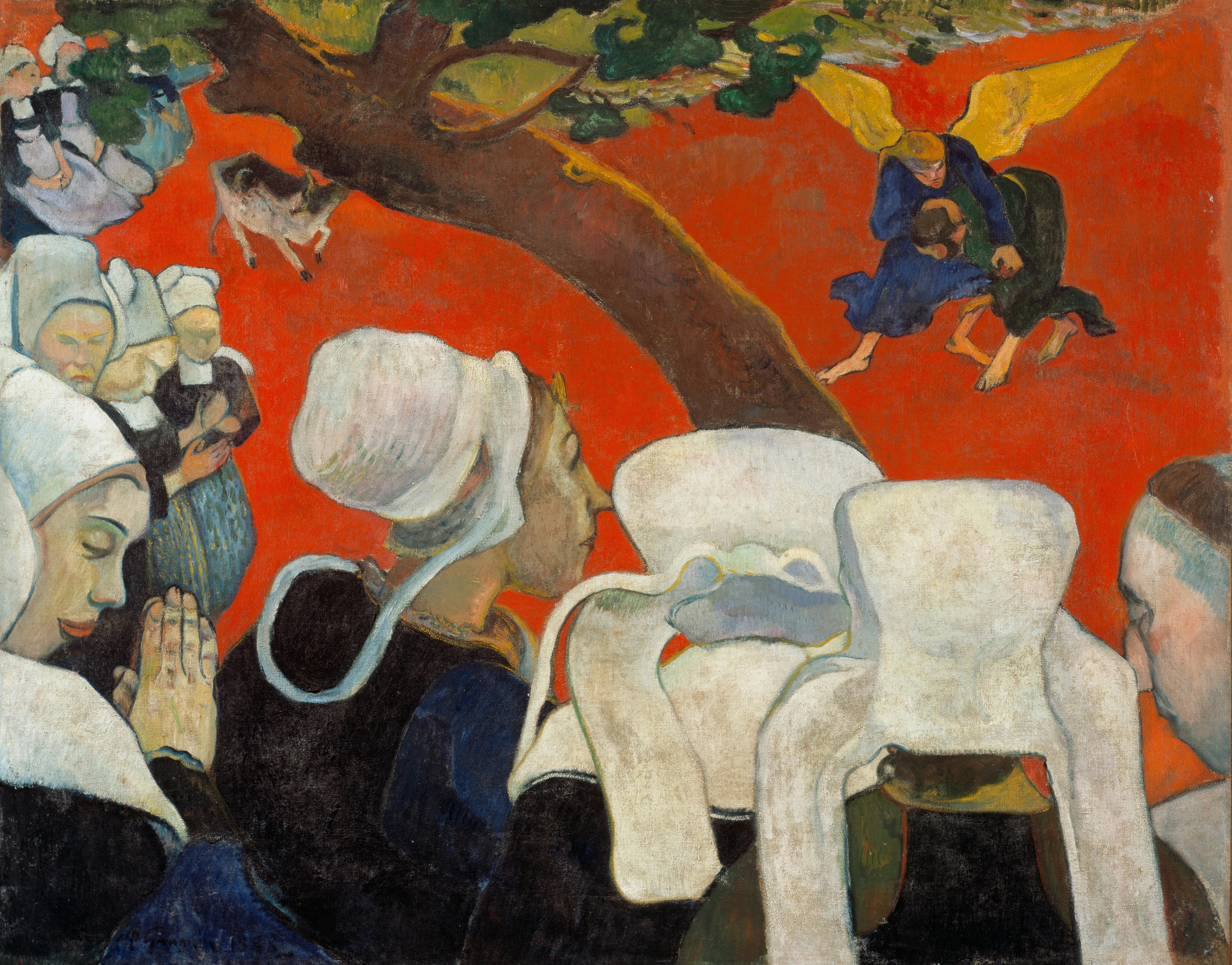
Vision After the Sermon (1888), by Paul Gauguin, National Gallery of Scotland, Edinburgh

In the Breton town of Pont-Aven, a series of artists led by Paul Gauguin gathered between 1888 and 1894, who developed a style heir to post-impressionism with a tendency towards primitivism and a taste for the exotic, with varied influences ranging from medieval art—especially tapestries, stained glass and enamels—to Japanese art. They developed a technique called cloisonnism (after the enamel cloisonné), characterized by the use of smooth areas of color delimited by dark contours. Another stylistic resource introduced by this school was the so-called synthetism, the search for formal simplification and recourse to memory as opposed to painting copied from nature. This movement was spread by the critic Albert Aurier and had its climax in the exhibition titled Symbolist and Synthetist Painters organized at the Café Volpini in Paris in 1889. Its principal members, in addition to Gauguin, included Émile Bernard, Louis Anquetin, Charles Filiger, Armand Seguin, Charles Laval, Émile Schuffenecker, Henry Moret, the Dutchman Meijer de Haan and the Swiss Cuno Amiet.

The founder of the group was Paul Gauguin, a restless artist who felt a yearning to move away from Western society and return to primitive life, more original and spontaneous, and to an art freed from academic rules and stereotyped concepts. After a stay in Martinique, in 1888 he settled in the Breton town of Pont-Aven, a mountain village surrounded by forests where he found calm and inspiration for his art.

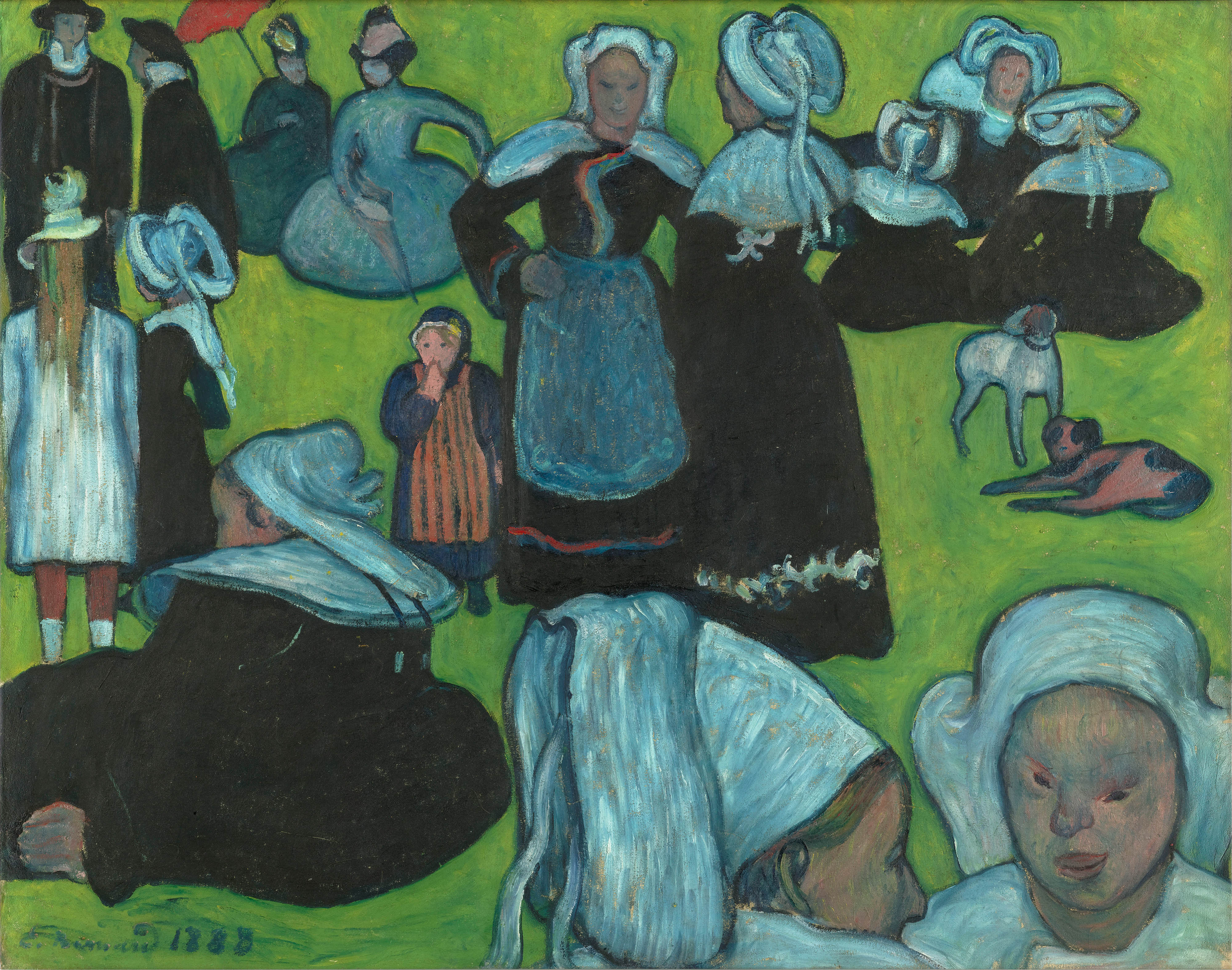
The Pardon (1888), by Émile Bernard, Musée d'Orsay, Paris

Gauguin's most advanced disciple was Émile Bernard. In the rustic and timeless atmosphere of Brittany, Bernard developed a new way of understanding the pictorial image, based on wide configurations of solid planes and sharp lines, with marked contours and violent colors, reduced to the seven colors of the prism. In the Revue Indépendante, the critic Édouard Dujardin called this new style cloisonnisme, from the enamel cloisonné, since the colors were shown compartmentalized as in this medieval technique. Along with Bernard, its main exponent was Louis Anquetin; both had been students of Fernand Cormon, and were fascinated by Japanese woodcuts and stained glass. Gauguin was introduced to the work of both artists at an exhibition at the Grand Restaurant Bouillon in 1887 and, although he did not fully embrace this way of painting, especially in terms of contours, his Vision after the Sermon shows their influence, especially in the saturated colors.

Two works from 1888 became the manifesto of this group: The Pardon by Bernard and Vision after the Sermon by Gauguin. The latter synthesized the essences of the new style: thematic concreteness—the vision of a religious scene suggested by the sermon and the women contemplating it all on the same plane—pure colors, marked contours and absence of modeling. This concreteness and simplification of the constituent elements of the painting led this new trend to be baptized also as synthetism. In this trend, observation, memory, imagination and emotion were essential elements of a painting for Gauguin, in addition to form and color, which are treated in a free, expressive way. In his search for a new style, Gauguin was inspired by medieval tapestries, Japanese prints and prehistoric art, in search of a style alien to naturalism that would best describe the artist's feelings.

Of the rest of the group, it is worth mentioning Charles Filiger, a typical "cursed artist", a heavy drinker, withdrawn from the world—he settled in Pont-Aven in 1889 and lived in Brittany for the rest of his life—and psychically unstable, to the point that he committed suicide. Intensely mystical, he developed a small-format work, generally in gouache, with firm but somewhat naive strokes, which gives his production a somewhat primitive air.

After the 1889 Café Volpini exhibition, Gauguin settled in the village of Le Pouldu with Paul Sérusier, where they repudiated synthetism for "established style" and continued their artistic research. Gauguin was still in search of an ever greater suppression of the model and imitation of nature, exploring new forms of representation based on primitivism and some influence of Japanese art and Paul Cézanne (Symbolist Self-Portrait with Halo, 1889, National Gallery of Art, Washington D. C.; The Yellow Christ, 1889, Albright-Knox Museum, Buffalo). He eventually left for Tahiti in search of a more wild and natural essence, and evolved into a more personal and intuitive style. Gauguin's work influenced Fauvism, expressionism, surrealism and even abstract art.

=== Les Nabis ===
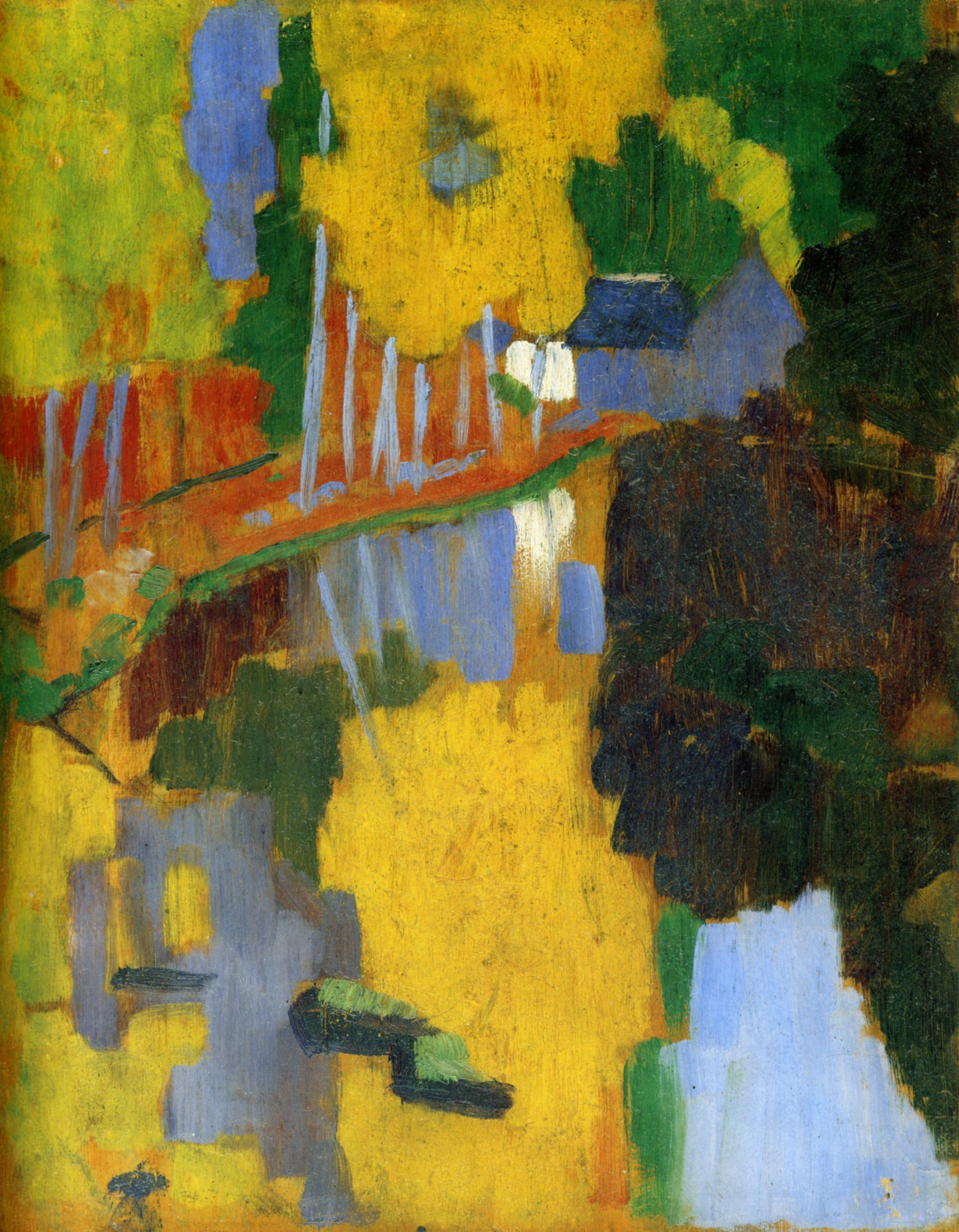
The Talisman (1888), by Paul Sérusier, Musée d'Orsay, Paris. This work impressed several students of the Académie Julian and marked the birth of the Nabi group

The Nabis were a group of artists active in Paris in the 1890s, directly inspired by Paul Gauguin and the Pont-Aven School. This group was influenced by Gauguin's rhythmic scheme and noted for an intense chromaticism of strong expressiveness. They disbanded in 1899.

After his stay with Gauguin, Paul Sérusier won great admiration with his work The Talisman (1888) among a group of young students of the Académie Julian, including Édouard Vuillard, Pierre Bonnard, Maurice Denis, Félix Vallotton and Paul Ranson. They formed a secret society called Nabis, from a Hebrew word meaning "prophet", a name proposed by the poet Henri Cazalis. They were interested in theosophy and Eastern religions, and had a close relationship with the Parisian literary milieu, especially with Stéphane Mallarmé. Their style started from synthesist research and a certain Japanese influence to advance in an art increasingly distant from academic premises, in which the chromatic research, the expressiveness of the design and the will to transfer emotions to the plastic language had greater relevance. They used to meet at a café in the Brady Passage and, later, at Paul Ranson's house on the Boulevard de Montparnasse. Other artists linked to this group were Henri-Gabriel Ibels, Ker-Xavier Roussel, Georges Lacombe, the Danish Mogens Ballin and the Dutch Jan Verkade.

The Nabis were influenced, in addition to Gauguin and synthetism, by Georges Seurat, Paul Cézanne, Odilon Redon and Pierre Puvis de Chavannes. His theoretical principles were based on a firm intention to synthesize all the arts, to delve into the social implications of art and to reflect on the scientific and mystical bases of art. In 1890, Denis published in the magazine Art et Critique a manifesto entitled Definition of Neotraditionalism, in which he defended the rupture with academicist naturalism and the recognition of the decorative function of art. In 1891 they held their first exhibition at the château de Saint-Germain-en-Laye, and in December of the same year they participated in the exhibition of Impressionist and Symbolist Painters at the Galerie Le Barc in Boutteville (Paris), where they were hailed as a second Symbolist generation.

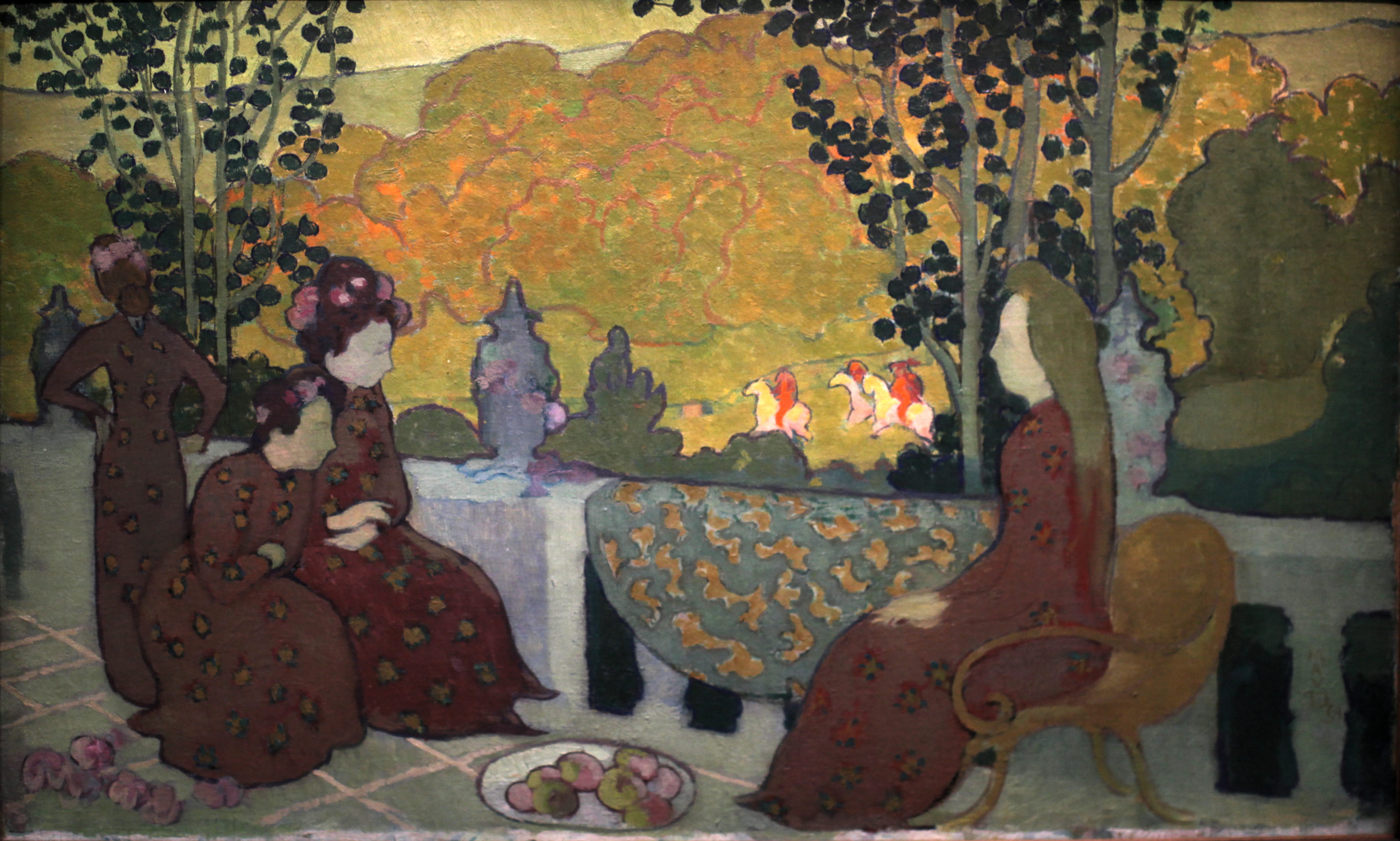
September Evening (1891), by Maurice Denis, Musée d'Orsay, Paris

Sérusier was considered the father of the Nabis, but he was the most heterogeneous of the group. Unlike the rest, who did not abandon the city, he preferred the countryside, and after his stays in Pont-Aven and Le Pouldu, he settled for a time in Huelgoat and, definitively, in Châteauneuf-du-Faou, in Brittany. His work is characterized by characters with a primitive appearance, without movement or relation to their environment, isolated and self-absorbed beings that look like immobile parts of nature, such as rocks or trees. He was often inspired by fairy tales and elves, especially from Breton folklore. He also produced some still lifes of Cézannian influence.

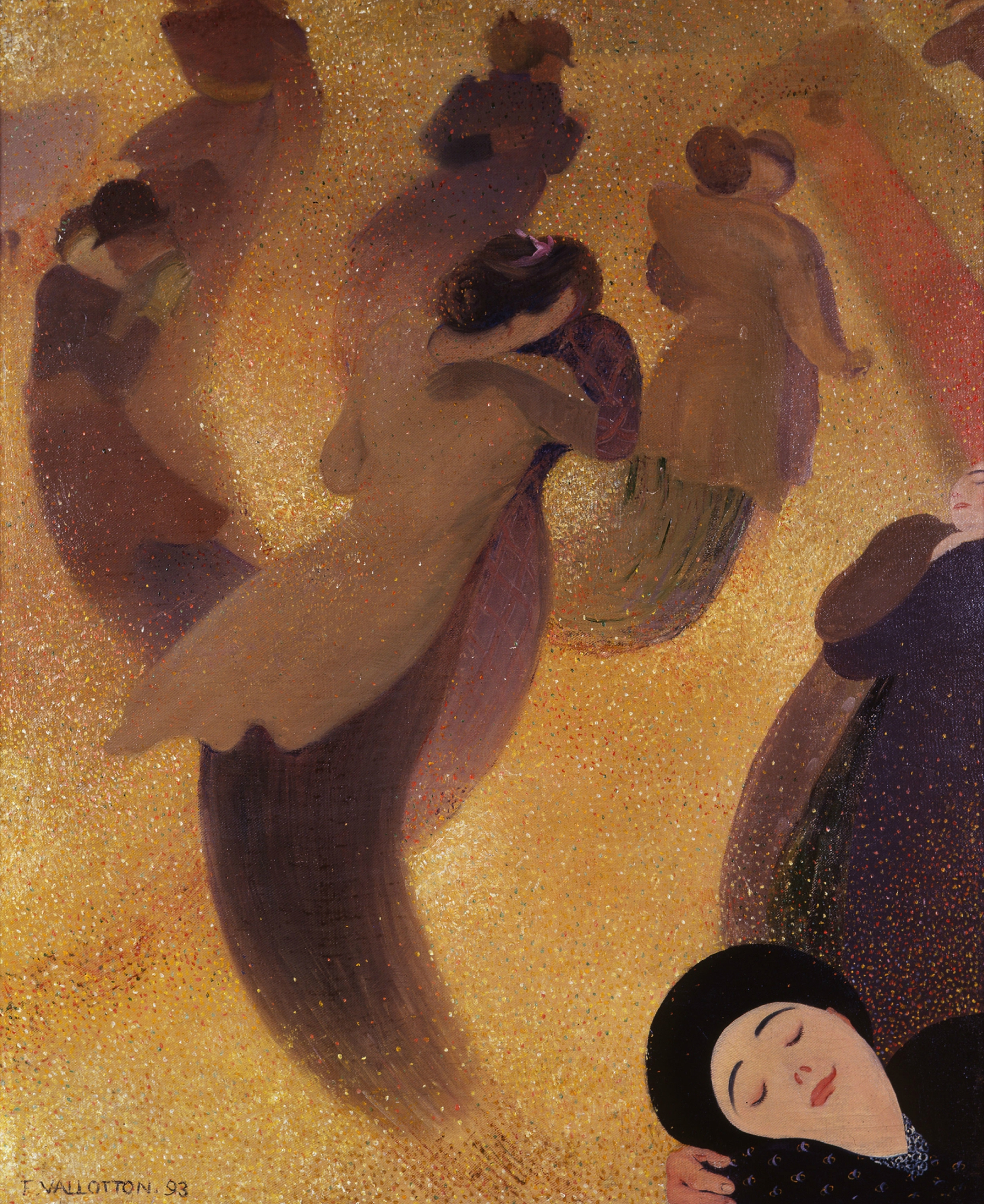
The waltz (1893), by Félix Vallotton, André-Malraux Museum of Modern Art, Le Havre

A multifaceted artist, Maurice Denis is considered by some to be the most talented symbolist artist. In addition to being a painter, he was an illustrator, lithographer and set designer, and was also an art critic. Influenced by Ingres and Puvis de Chavannes, as well as Gauguin, Bernard and the Pont-Aven group, and with certain reminiscences of Blake and Pre-Raphaelite painting, developed a work of marked sentimentalism that denotes a conception of naturalistic and pious life, almost naive in its approach of blissful purity, which highlights the decorative, fine color contrasts and harmony of pure lines, with a serene and monumental air. In addition to his pictorial production he illustrated books such as Reply of the shepherdess to the shepherd by Édouard Dujardin, Sanity by Paul Verlaine, Imitation of Christ by Thomas à Kempis or Journey of Urien by André Gide. He later focused on religious art and mural painting, and founded the Studio of Sacred Art.

The Swiss-born Vallotton began in woodcut, with a certain modernist tendency. His work is characterized by eroticism and black humor, with nudes of flat composition in which the influence of Japanese art is denoted and faces that look like masks. His Bath on a Summer Afternoon, which he presented at the Salon des Indépendants in 1893, was widely criticized for its mixture of impudence and ironic tone. At the end of his life he devoted himself to landscape, which is notable for its luminosity.

Bonnard was a painter, illustrator and lithographer. He was an excellent draughtsman, with softly contoured figures that delicately express the subtlest movements. Because of his mastery of the brush he was nicknamed "the Japanese nabi." Together with Vuillard, he developed a subject matter centered on a type of images of social atmosphere that reflected daily life in generally interior scenes, with a strong charge of psychological introspection, a style defined by critics as "intimism." He exhibited regularly at the Salon des Indépendants and the Salon d'Autumne. He was later somewhat linked to Fauvism, but always retained a personal essence.

Vuillard was also a painter and lithographer and, like his friend Bonnard, his work focused on intimacy. His style was characterized by a flat color modeling reminiscent of Gauguin and Puvis de Chavannes. Fond of photography, he sometimes used it as a starting point for his compositions.

Ranson studied at the École des Arts Décoratifs in Paris and the Académie Julian. In his work he shows his interest in occultism and religion. In 1908 he founded the Académie Ranson, where some of his Nabis friends taught. Influenced by Japanese art, his style is characterized by a certain tendency towards monochrome and strongly marked contours. His style was somewhat academicist, although he showed greater originality in his drawings and illustrations, as well as his cartoons for tapestries, which were embroidered by his wife.

=== Rosicrucianism ===
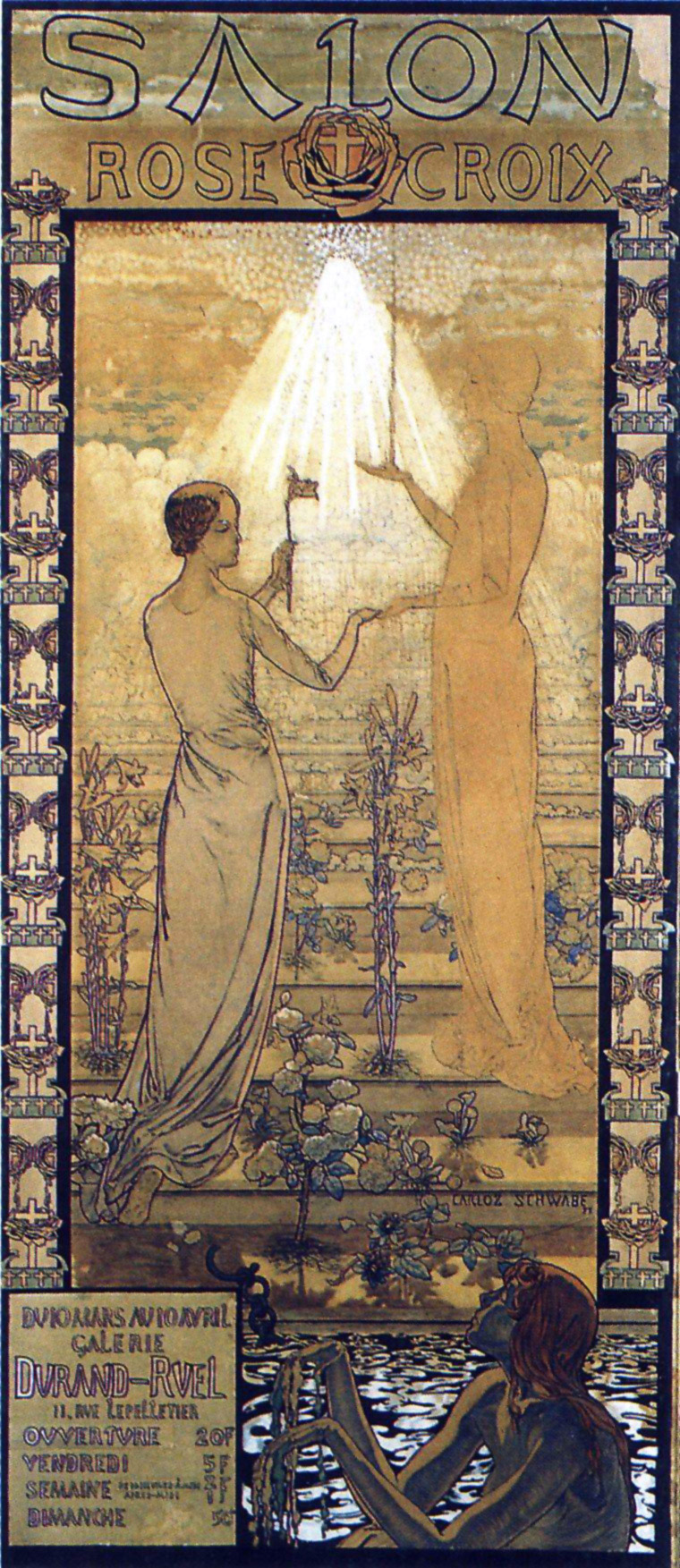
Poster of the Salon de la Rose+Croix of 1892, by Carlos Schwabe, Museu Nacional de Belas Artes, Rio de Janeiro

The Order of the Rosicrucians was a secret society supposedly founded by a medieval mystic named Christian Rosenkreuz, who would have attained wisdom on a journey to the East. In 1612, a manifesto entitled Fama Fraternitatis and published in Kassel led to the revival of this esoteric order, which later split into several branches, some of them linked to Freemasonry. In 1888 the marquis Stanislas de Guaita founded in France the Cabalistic Order of the Rose Cross, dedicated to the study of kabbalah, alchemy and occultism in general. Shortly after, in 1890, the Order of the Rose-Cross of the Temple and of the Grail, founded by Joséphin Péladan—who used the title Sâr (magician in Chaldean), more distant from esotericism and closer to the Catholic tradition. Also known as Aesthetic Rose Cross, this new order placed special emphasis on the cultivation and diffusion of art. Between 1892 and 1897 the Order organized a series of artistic salons – known as Salon de la Rose + Croix—in which works of art, preferably in the symbolist style, were exhibited. The Rosicrucians defended mysticism, beauty, lyricism, legend and allegory, and rejected naturalism, humorous themes and genres such as history painting, landscape or still life.

In 1891 Péladan, the poet Saint-Pol-Roux and Count Antoine de la Rochefoucauld published the Commandments of the Rosicrucians on aesthetics, in which they proscribed any representation of contemporary life, as well as any domestic animal or used for sport, flowers, still lifes, fruits, accessories and other exercises that painters have the insolence to expose. Instead, "to further the Catholic ideal and mysticism, the Order will welcome any work founded on legend, myth, allegory, dream."

The first salon was held at the Durand-Riel Gallery in Paris from March 10 to April 10, 1892. Artists such as Félix Vallotton, Émile Bernard, Charles Filiger, Armand Point, Edgar Maxence and Alexandre Séon, as well as a young Georges Rouault and the sculptor Bourdelle participated, and foreign artists such as Jan Toorop, Ferdinand Hodler and several members of the Belgian group Les Vingt, such as Xavier Mellery, George Minne and Carlos Schwabe. In the exhibition catalog these artists stated that they wanted to "destroy realism and bring art closer to Catholic ideas, mysticism, legend, myth, allegory and dreams". To this end, they were inspired by the work of Poe and Baudelaire, in addition to Wagnerian operas and Arthurian legends.

Artist, you are king: art is the true kingdom. When your hand has written a perfect line, the cherubs themselves descend from heaven and look into it as in a mirror. Super-spiritualized drawing, soul-filled line, full form, you embody our dreams.

— Joséphin Péladan, manifesto of the 1st Rose+Croix Exhibition.

=== The pompier symbolism ===
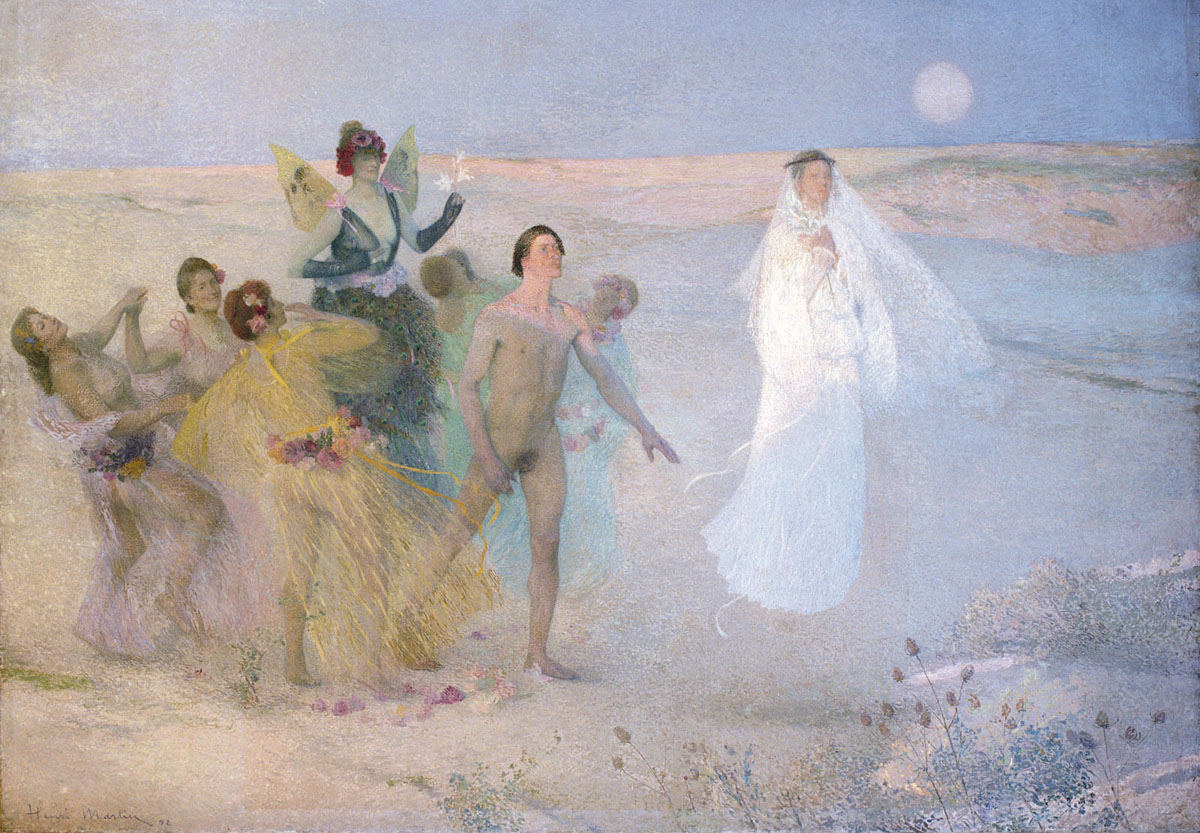
Man between vice and virtue (1892), by Henri Martin, Musée des Augustins, Toulouse

Symbolism exerted at the end of the century a certain influence on institutional art, academicism, a style anchored in the past both in the choice of themes and in the techniques and resources made available to the artist. In France, in the second half of the 19th century, this art received the name art pompier (fireman's art, a pejorative denomination derived from the fact that many authors represented classical heroes with helmets resembling fireman's helmets). Since the beginning of the century, academic art had been confined to a style based on strict rules inspired by Greco-Roman classicism, but also by earlier classicist authors, such as Raphael, Poussin or Guido Reni. Technically, they were based on careful drawing, formal balance, perfect line, plastic purity and careful detailing, together with realistic and harmonious coloring.

Some of these authors were seduced by the symbolist imagery and its subjective and spiritual evocation, but they translated it with a decorativist tone closer to modernism than to symbolism itself, a contrived style in which the figures of languid women with hair waved by the wind, the arabesques and the exuberant vegetation of rolled flowers stand out. Some of these artists were Jules-Élie Delaunay, Henri Le Sidaner, Émile-René Ménard, Henri Martin, Ernest Laurent, James Tissot, Ernest Hébert, Georges-Antoine Rochegrosse, Eugène Grasset, Charles Maurin and Armand Point.

== Belgium and the Netherlands ==
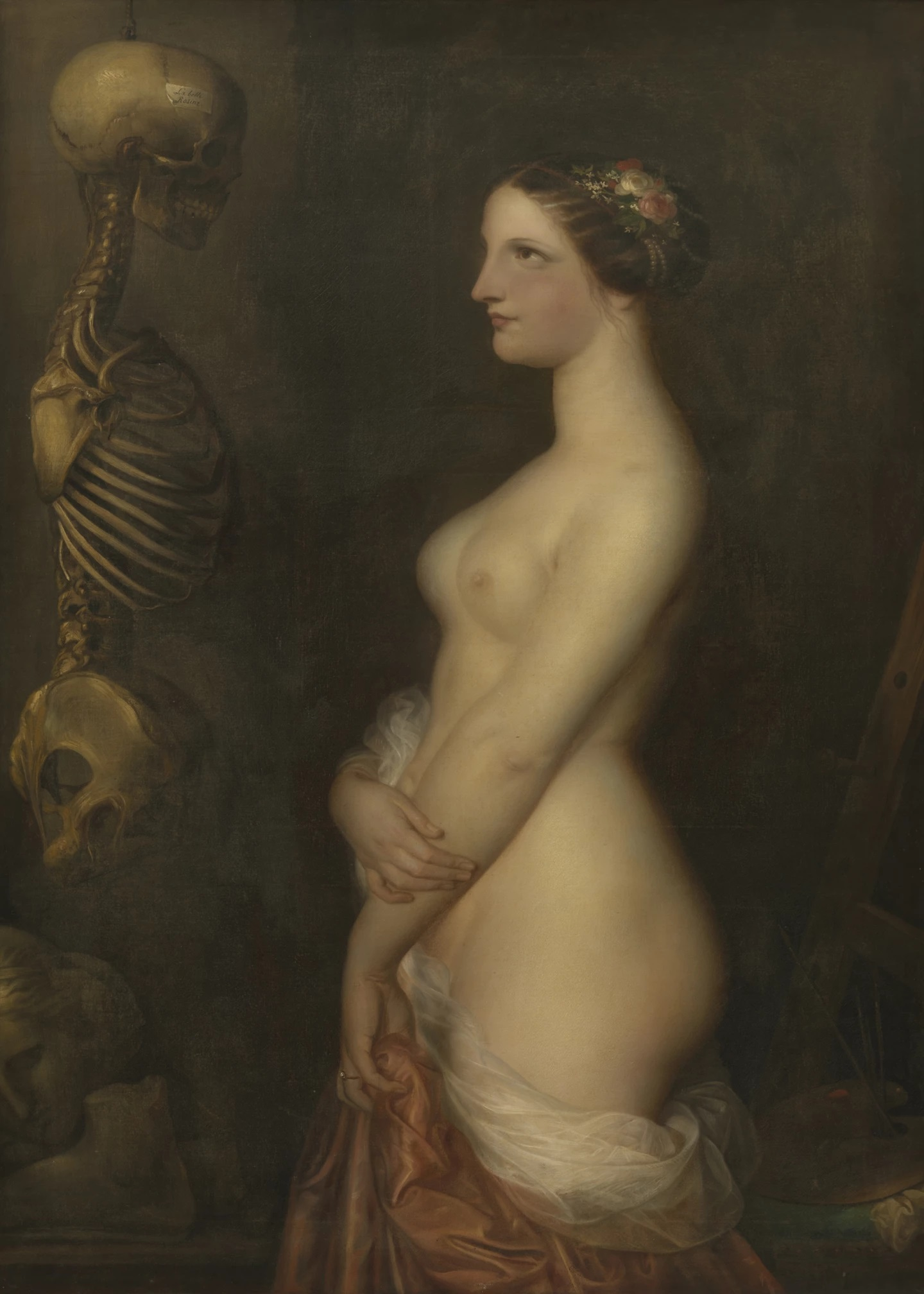
La Belle Rosine (1847), by Antoine Wiertz, Wiertz Museum, Brussels

Belgium was the starting point of symbolism along with France, to the point that artists from both countries were in close contact and participated in exhibitions on both sides of the border. As in the Gallic country, there was a notable literary and artistic circle led by the writers Maurice Maeterlinck and Émile Verhaeren, as well as the art critic Octave Maus, factotum of the artistic groups Les Vingt and La Libre Esthétique. Also as in France, several magazines were founded that served as a platform for Symbolism, such as Jeune Belgique, L'Art moderne, Wallonie and La nouvelle société.

The group Les Vingt was active between 1883 and 1893. It was initially made up of twenty painters, sculptors and writers, although over time there were departures and new additions. It was founded by Octave Maus, with the aim of promoting art in his country through exhibitions, which had room for both plastic and decorative arts as well as music and poetry, in styles ranging from neo and post-impressionism to symbolism, synthetism and modernism. Its initial members included James Ensor, Fernand Khnopff and Théo van Rysselberghe, while later artists such as Félicien Rops, Isidore Verheyden, Henry Van de Velde, Auguste Rodin, Paul Signac and Jan Toorop joined the group. Its medium of dissemination was the newspaper L'Art moderne, founded in 1881. After the dissolution of the group in 1893, Maus and Van Rysselberghe founded La Libre Estéthique, which continued its work popularizing art with a greater emphasis on the decorative arts. This association continued its work until 1914.

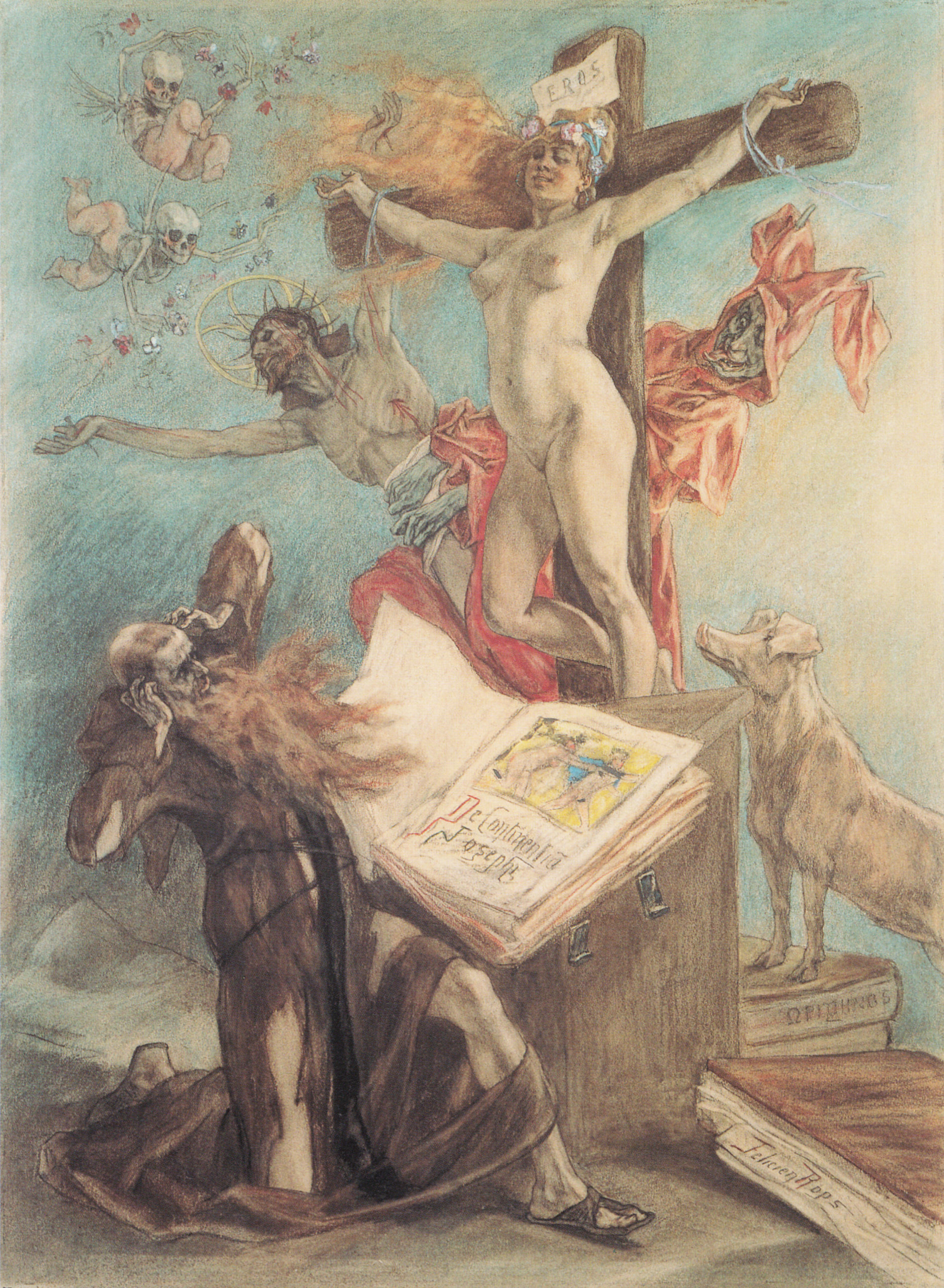
Temptations of Saint Anthony (1878), by Félicien Rops, Cabinet des Estampes de la Bibliothèque Royale Albert Ier, Brussels

An ancestor of symbolism in Belgium was Antoine Wiertz, an artist trained in Romanticism who built a studio in Brussels in the form of a Greek temple, now the Wiertz Museum. His works have an academicist invoice, but the choice of subjects is close to symbolism, as in The Beautiful Rosine (1847, Wiertz Museum, Brussels), where a naked young woman contemplates a skeleton on whose skull is visible an inscription with the title of the work, with the result that the beautiful was not the young woman, but the skeleton.

Félicien Rops was a painter and graphic artist of great imagination, with a predilection for subject matter centered on perversity and eroticism. He was inspired by the world of the fantastic and the supernatural, with a penchant for the satanic and references to death, with an eroticism that reflects the dark and perverted aspect of love. He was admired by Sâr Péladan and by Huysmans, who emphasized the depravity of his work. Huysmans wrote of him, "between purity, whose essence is divine, and lust, which is the devil himself, Félicien Rops, with the soul of an inverted primitive, has penetrated into Satanism". He illustrated books by Baudelaire, Mallarmé and Barbey d'Aurevilly.

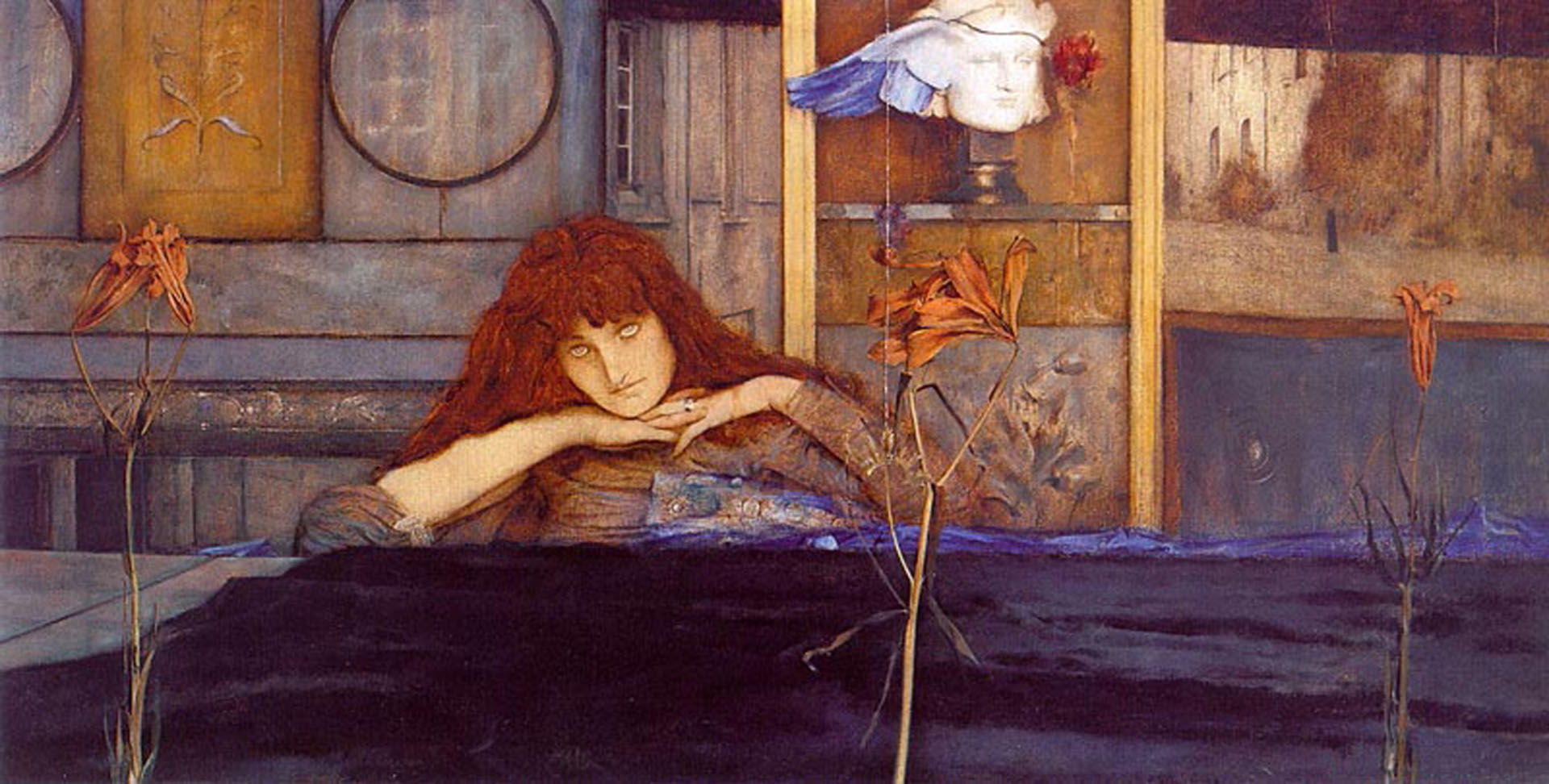
I lock the door upon myself (1891), by Fernand Khnopff, Neue Pinakothek, Munich

Fernand Khnopff developed a dreamlike-allegorical theme of women transformed into angels or sphinxes, with disturbing atmospheres of great technical refinement. Influenced by Dürer, Giorgione, Tintoretto, Ingres, Delacroix, Whistler and the Pre-Raphaelites, developed a work of profound meaning that disdains nature and is inspired by art itself, from which he constructs a second nature. One art critic defined him as a "refined aesthete who only feels life through ancient art." He often used photographs as the basis for his compositions, which sometimes have an almost photographic appearance. Self-proclaimed misogynist and obsessed with his sister's beauty, he elaborated a type of androgynous woman, either dressed as an Amazon warrior in armor or metamorphosed into a sphinx, tiger or jaguar. His images are evanescent, bathed in a kind of crepuscular light, with a preference for pastel and watercolor, as well as blue. Khnopff had a powerful influence on the Viennese Secession and, in particular, on Gustav Klimt.

Jean Delville was interested in occultism and showed in his work secret obsessions, where his figures are a mixture of flesh and spirit. He believed in the existence of a divine fluid, reincarnation, telepathy, ecstasy, hauntings and other concepts typical of occultism. In 1895 he published a book entitled Dialogue between us. Cabalistic, Occult, Idealistic Argumentation, in which he expounded his ideas. His works have a strong oneiric stamp and abound in satanic iconography, as in The Treasures of Satan (1895, Royal Museums of Fine Arts of Belgium, Brussels). He was a disciple of Sâr Péladan, and in his wake founded in his country the Pour l'art circle and the Salon d'art idéaliste.

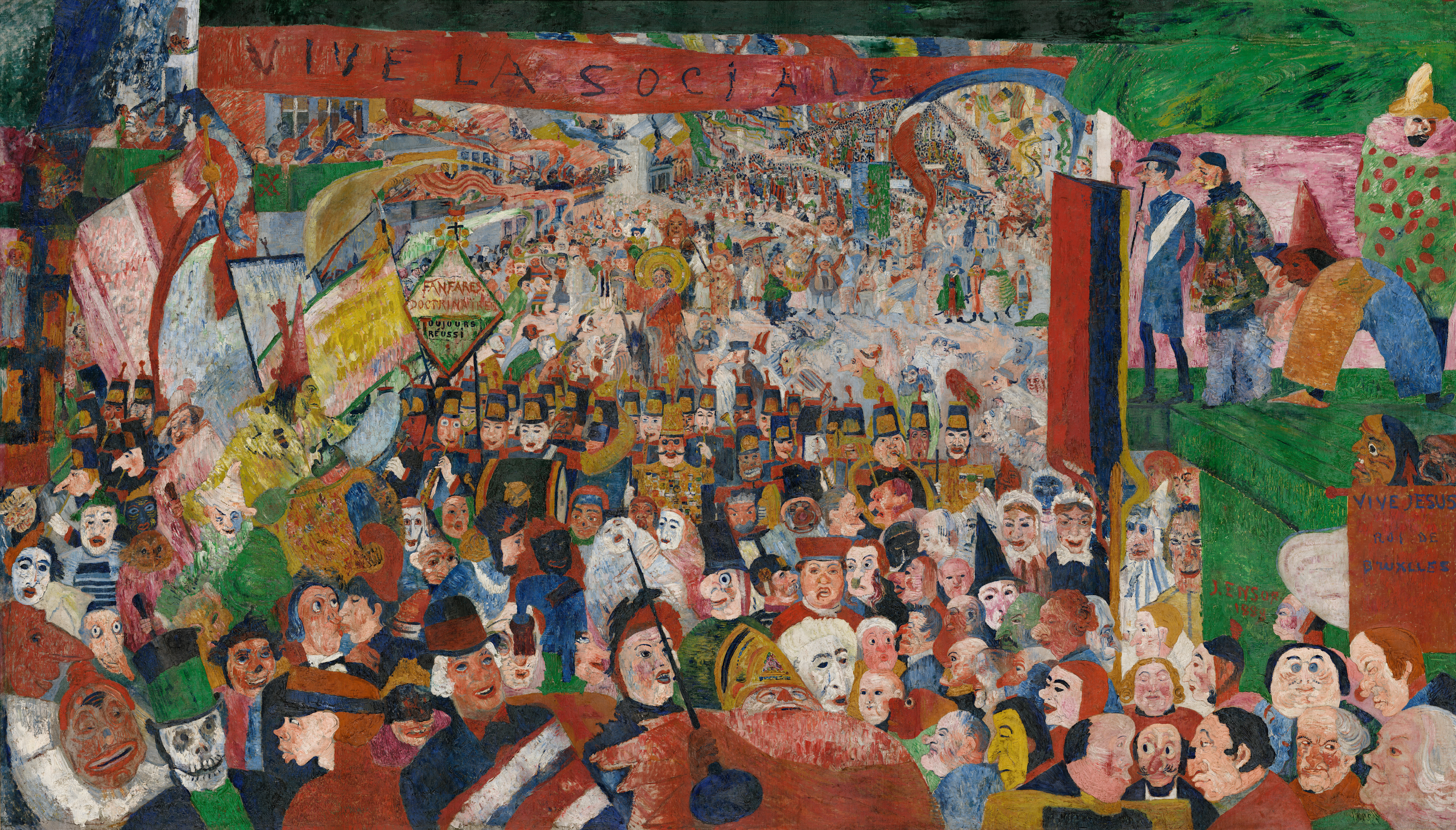
Christ's Entry into Brussels (1889), by James Ensor, Getty Museum, Los Angeles

James Ensor created a world inspired by his family's souvenir store, where objects such as masks, puppets, toys, shells, fossils, porcelain and antiques proliferated. His interest in science, especially the microscopic world, is also evident in his work. Among his artistic references are Brueghel, Bosch, Rembrandt, Goya, Turner and Whistler, as well as the immediate ascendant of Félicien Rops. He joined the group Les Vingt, but was rejected for his caricatured and grotesque vision of the society of his time, as in his work Christ's Entry into Brussels (1888, Getty Museum, Los Angeles), which represents the Passion of Jesus in the middle of a carnival parade, a work that caused a great scandal at the time. He had a preference for popular themes, translating them into enigmatic and irreverent scenes, of an absurd and burlesque character, with an acid and corrosive sense of humor, centered on figures of vagabonds, drunks, skeletons, masks and carnival scenes. His style is delirious, without rules, of a radical modernity that preludes the avant-garde art, in which the forms do not reflect contents, but let them glimpse, they reveal them. They are deformed images, in which a strong psychological introspection, of arbitrary, strident, dissonant colors, with blinding effects of light. As he himself expressed, "a correct line cannot inspire elevated feelings, nor can it express pain, struggle, enthusiasm, restlessness, poetry."

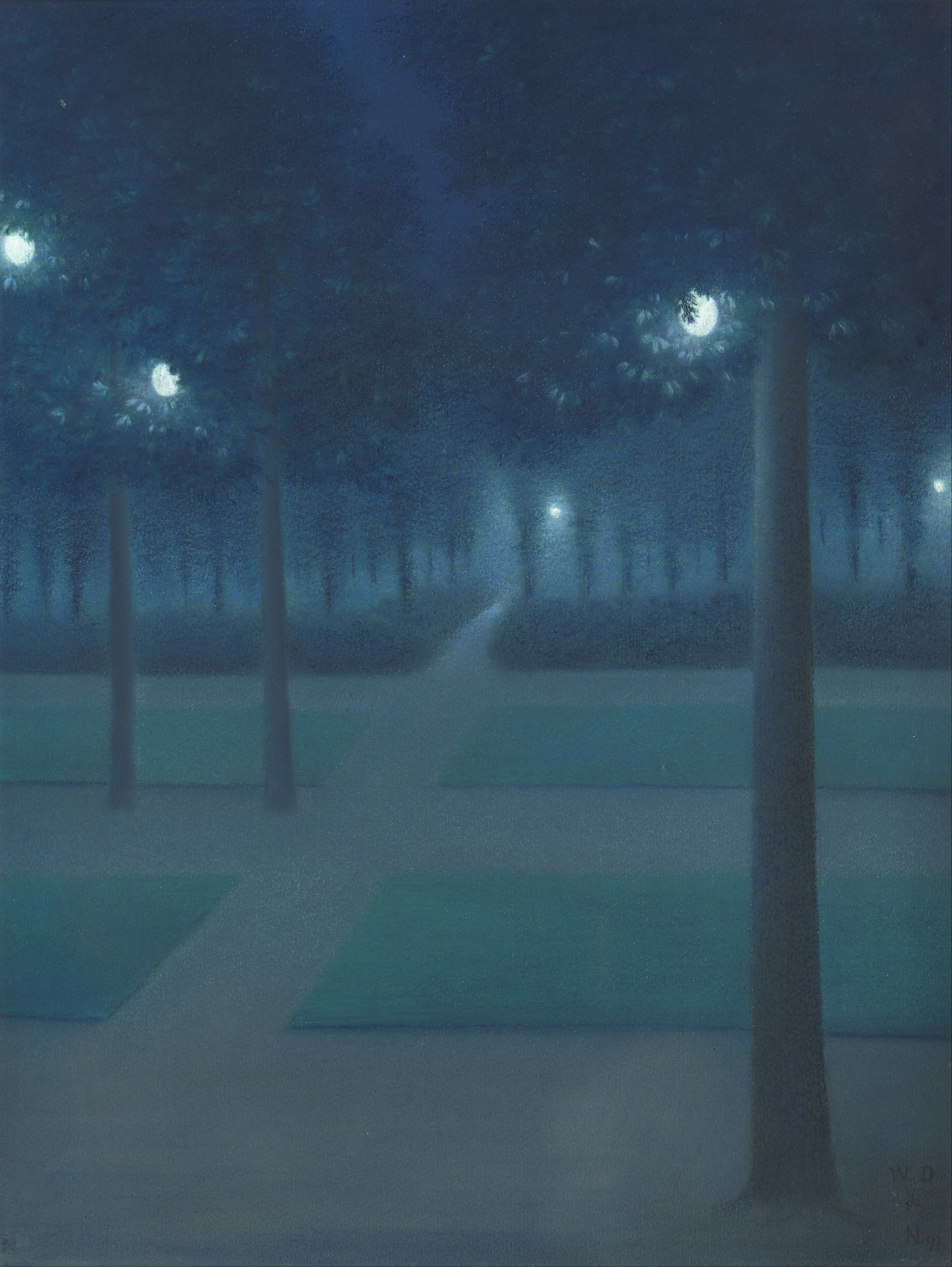
Nocturn in the Parc Royal, Brussels (1897), by William Degouve de Nuncques, Musée d'Orsay, Paris

William Degouve de Nuncques elaborated in his most purely symbolist period (1890s) a series of urban landscapes with a preference for the nocturnal setting, with a dreamlike component precursor of surrealism: Angels of the Night (1891, Kröller-Müller Museum, Otterlo), Black Swan (1896, Kröller-Müller Museum, Otterlo), Night Effect (1896, Ixelles Museum), Aurora (1897, Ghent Museum of Fine Arts). His work The Blind House (1892, Kröller-Müller Museum, Otterlo) influenced The Empire of Lights (1954) by René Magritte. Most of his images evoke childlike, intimately evocative dreams.

Léon Spilliaert developed a style of simple, expressive forms, in which rhythm and emptiness provoke a certain sense of anguish, as in Vertigo (1908, Musée des Beaux-Arts, Ostend) or Moonlight and Lights (1909, Musée d'Orsay, Paris). He suffered from insomnia, so at night he wandered around the city and found in the solitary nocturnal landscapes the inspiration for his works. He also made seascapes with wide deserted beaches and silent seas of horizontal composition. On other occasions he showed a somewhat gruesome eroticism and metaphorical character. His style was somewhat naive, with a tendency towards arabesque and decorativism, in which the Nabi influence is perceptible. It later evolved into Expressionism.

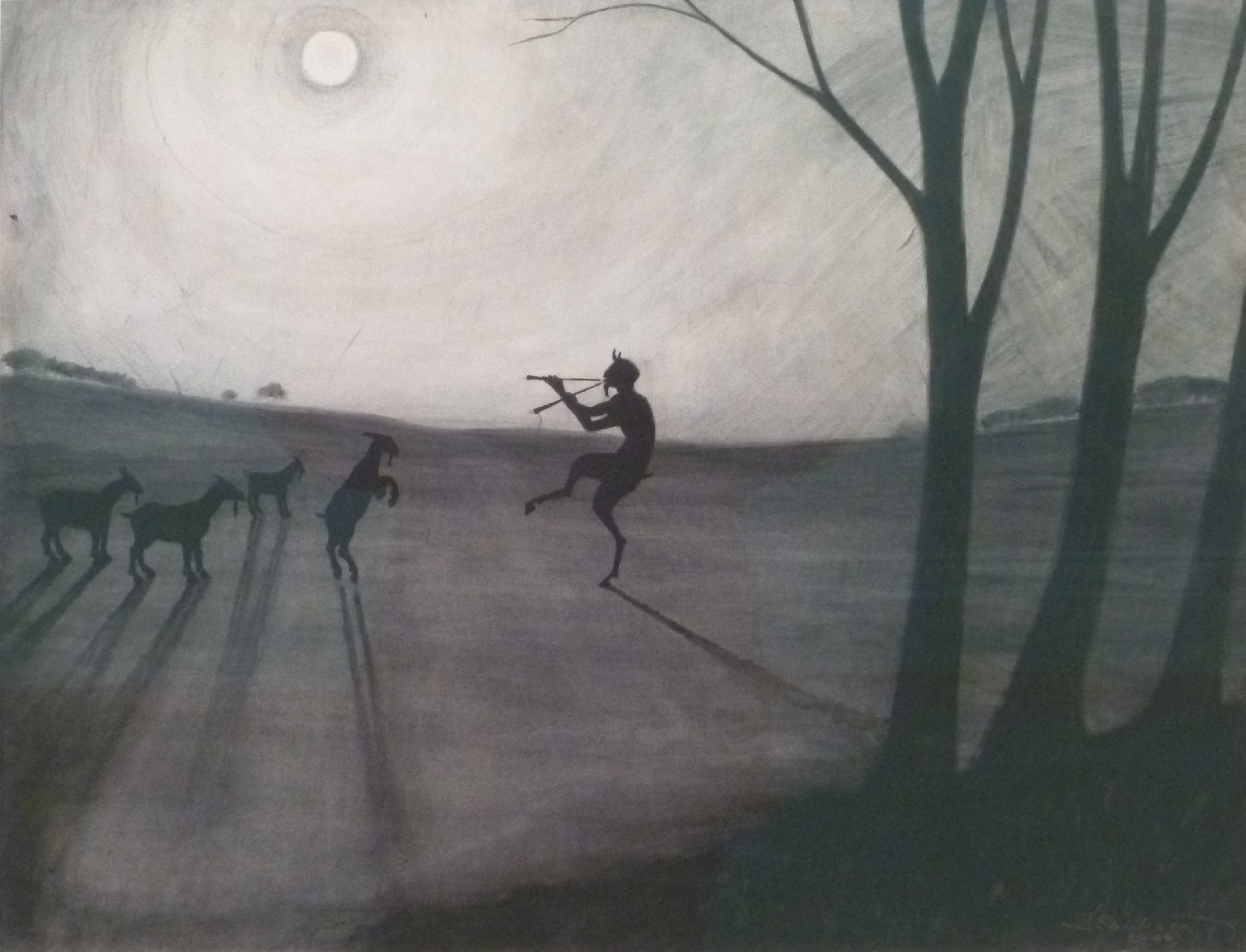
Faun by Moonlight (1900), by Léon Spilliaert, private collection

Xavier Mellery had a classicist training that he complemented in Italy, where he was influenced by the Venetian School—especially Carpaccio—and the Michelangelo of the Sistine Chapel. In 1870 he won the Prix de Rome. From 1885 he practiced mural painting, with allegorical images reminiscent of the work of Puvis de Chavannes. His style was severe and intimate, sometimes close to expressionism, with themes evoking mystery and poetry. He was a member of Les Vingt and exhibited at the Salon de la Rose+Croix. He was Fernand Khnopff's teacher.

Léon Frédéric moved between academicist realism and symbolism, with works of high mysticism in which his social commitment is also revealed. His symbolist period was centered in the 1890s, with a special influence of Pre-Raphaelitism, in a precise, coldly colored style with a strong allegorical component (Thought Awakening, 1891). He often employed the triptych format: The Ages of the Worker (1895–1897, Musée d'Orsay, Paris), The Stream, the Torrent, the Still Water (1897–1900, Royal Museums of Fine Arts of Belgium, Brussels).

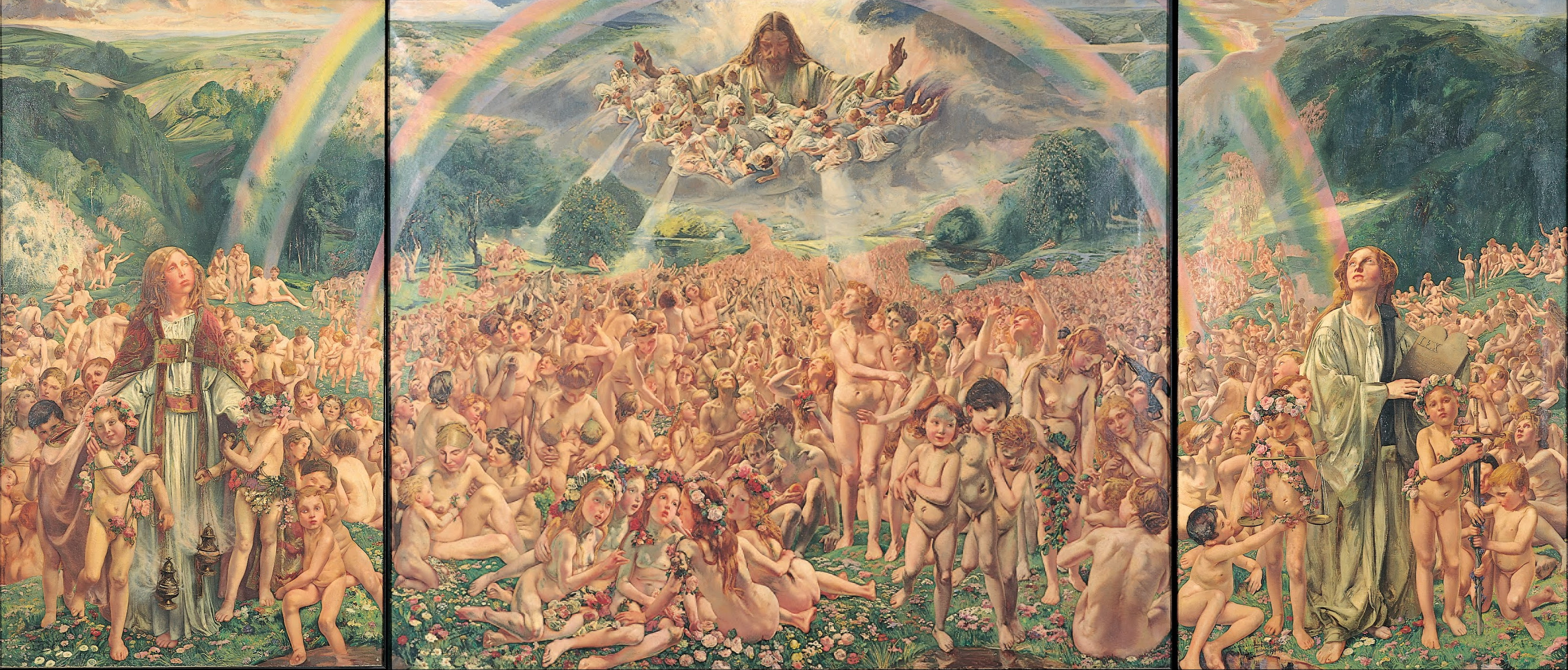
All Things Die, But All Will Be Resurrected through God's Love (1893–1918), by Léon Frédéric, Ohara Art Museum, Kurashiki

Émile Fabry had a style reminiscent of Mannerist, with deformed figures with a melancholic aspect. In 1892 he founded with Delville and Mellery the Cercle pour l'Art. He exhibited at the Salon de la Rose+Croix in 1893 and 1895. From 1900 he devoted himself especially to frescoes for public buildings.

Constant Montald was a painter and decorator, specializing in landscapes. In 1884 he studied at the École des Beaux-Arts in Paris and in 1886 won the Prix de Rome; he also spent stays in Italy and Egypt. Impressed by a visit to the St. Mark's Basilica in Venice, in his works he assiduously used gold backgrounds, one of the characteristics of his production together with the use of profuse vegetation. Influenced by Byzantine art and Pre-Raphaelitism, his style was ornamental, calmly paced, with an emphasis on blue and gold tones.

Henry de Groux was a painter, sculptor and lithographer. He was a member of Les Vingt, but was expelled in 1890 when he refused to have his works exhibited alongside those of Vincent van Gogh. He was a friend of Degouve de Nuncques, with whom he shared a studio in Brussels and Paris. His masterpiece is Christ of Outrages (1889, private collection), in which he portrayed himself as Christ. Strong-willed, his work denotes his personal impulsiveness, but he was esteemed by the likes of Émile Zola and Léon Bloy.

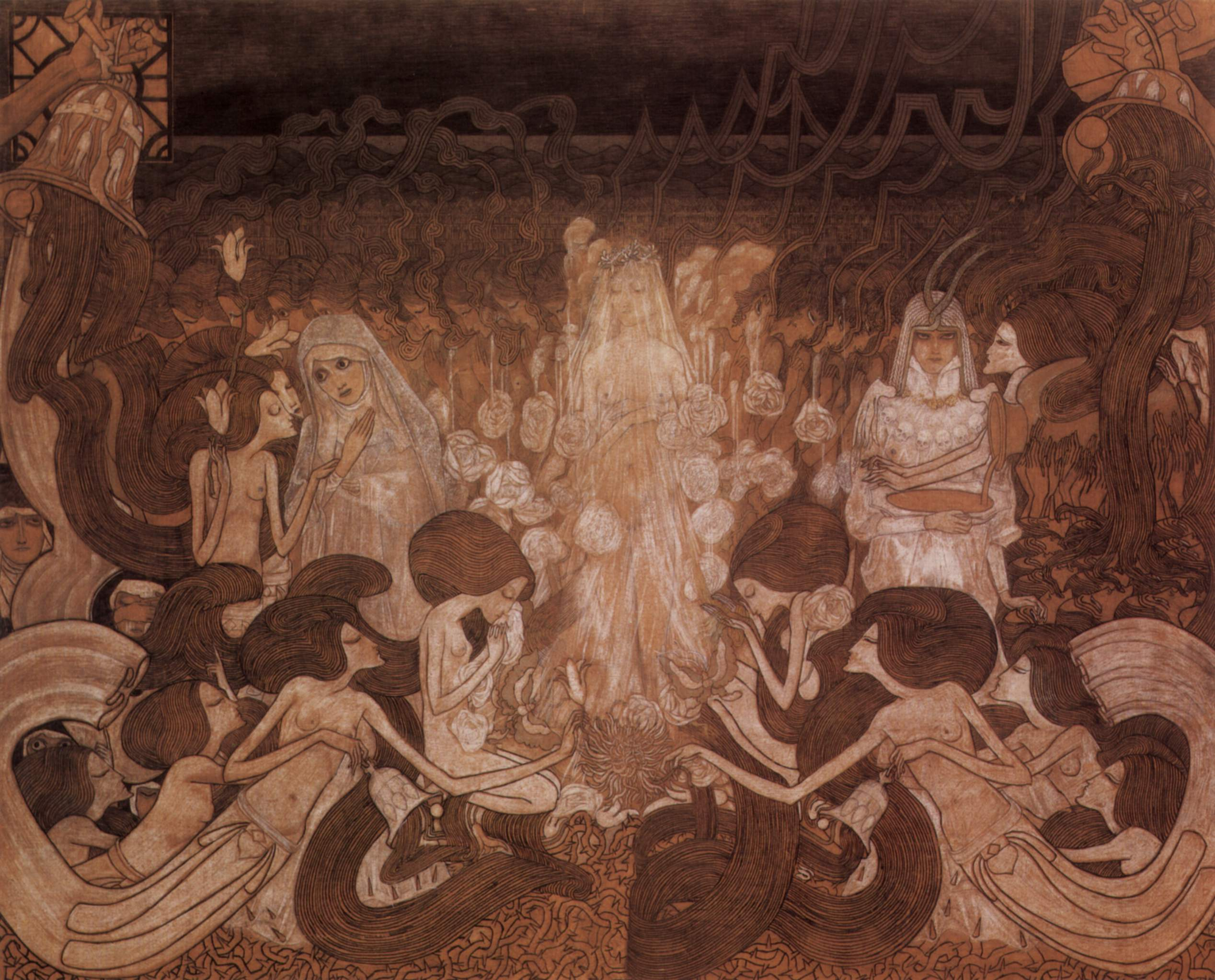
The Three Brides (1893), by Jan Toorop, Kröller-Müller-Museum, Otterlo

In the Netherlands, symbolism was not as widespread as in its neighboring country, being a Protestant country with a capitalist economy, factors that favored rather realism in art, as seen in the Hague School, which dominated the fin-de-siècle art scene. This contributed to the fact that a singular artist such as Vincent van Gogh had to settle in France. Thus, there were few artists who approached Symbolism, among whom the following are worth mentioning. Jan Toorop and Johan Thorn-Prikker, as well as to a lesser extent Richard Roland Holst, who had a Symbolist phase between 1891 and 1900. Other artists close to symbolism were Antoon Derkinderen, Hendrikus Jansen and Theo van Hoytema.

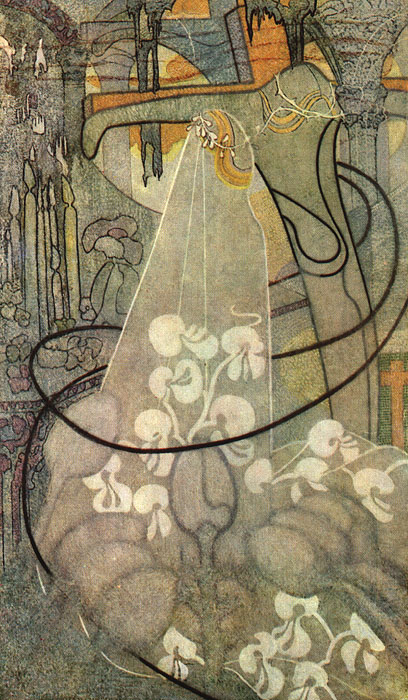
The Bride (1892–1893), by Johan Thorn-Prikker, Kröller-Müller Museum, Otterlo

Toorop was an eclectic artist, who combined various styles in the search for his own language, such as symbolism, modernism, pointillism, Gauguinian synthetism, the linearism of Beardsley and Japanese print. He was particularly devoted to allegorical and symbolic subject matter and, from 1905, to religious subject matter. He was the author of The Three Brides (1893, Kröller-Müller Museum, Otterlo), which denotes the influence of the Java—where he was born—with long-armed figures and delicate silhouettes. According to the author himself, the central bride represented "the most manifest and beautiful will", the one on the left "the suffering of the soul" and the one on the right "the sensual world". Another interpretation makes the one in the center the bride of man, on the left that of Christ and on the right that of Satan. In 1905 he converted to Catholicism and turned to religious subject matter, with a fragmented pointillist technique that steered him towards a degree of expressionism.

Thorn-Prikker moved from Impressionism to Symbolism through the influence of Toorop and through his admiration for the work of Maurice Denis. Even so, his Symbolist phase was short-lived, from 1892 to 1895. Among his themes floral motifs and arabesques abound, with a certain tendency towards abstraction and a certain mannerism for which he was criticized in his day.

Holst Holst had, like Toorop and Thorn-Prikker, contacts with the group Les Vingt and with the Rosicrucians. In his work the influence of Rossetti, Whistler and Beardsley is evident. From 1900 he devoted himself to monumental art.

One of the pioneers of the avant-garde, Piet Mondrian, before coming to abstraction neoplasticist, made some symbolist works, generated by his interest in esotericism. He was influenced by Toorop, as well as Gauguin, Matisse and Van Dongen. In this stage, centered between 1907 and 1910, he began to work with primary colors, which would be one of his distinctive signs already in his abstract phase. He used in his works of these years a vivid chromatism divided into zones, reminiscent of both Fauvism and Pointillism, with a formal simplification that brought him closer to Cubism, and later, abstraction.

== Germanic countries ==
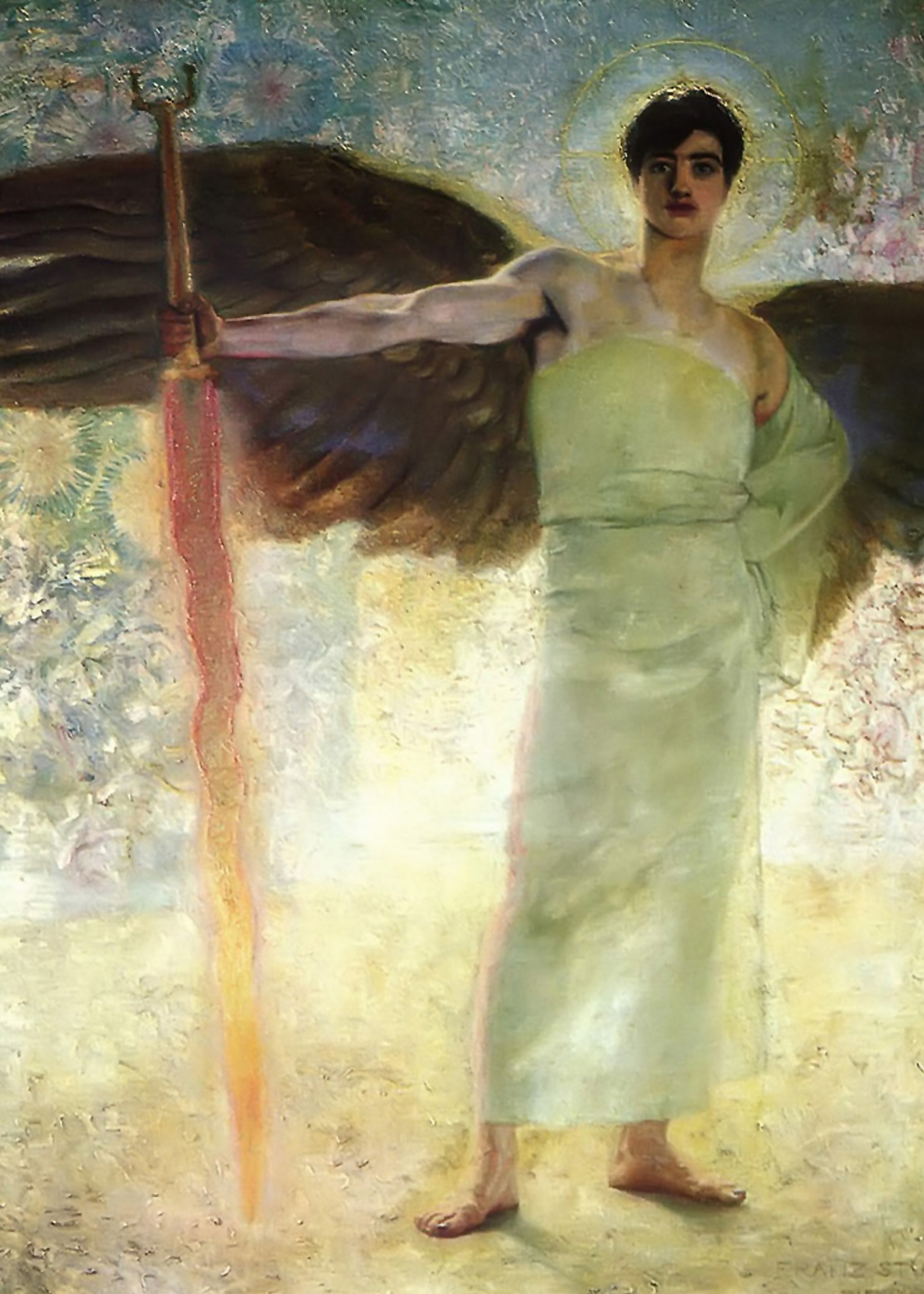
The Guardian of Paradise (1899), by Franz von Stuck, Museum Villa Stuck, Munich

Germanic symbolism was a direct heir of Romanticism and its passion for medieval legends, such as those of the Nibelungen cycle. It was also strongly related to literature and music, a field in which the work of Richard Wagner exerted a powerful influence. Among the literary figures of the symbolist circle were Hugo von Hofmannsthal, Stefan George and Rainer Maria Rilke, as well as, in the field of philosophy, Friedrich Nietzsche. Several magazines were also founded here, such as Jugend, Pan, Fliegende Blätter and Simplicissimus. The main exhibition centers were in Vienna, Berlin and Munich, cities in which artistic groups known as Sezession were created: Munich in 1892, Vienna in 1897 and Berlin in 1899. Although more closely linked to modernism than to symbolism, they had in common with the latter an eagerness to renew art away from academicism, and promoted in their exhibitions the work of several symbolist artists. According to Emile Langui, "in Germany and Austria Symbolism is practically confused with art nouveau, with the Munich Secession and the Vienna Secession."

In Germany, the pioneer of symbolism was Hans von Marées. Classically trained, after a pointillist phase the influence of Böcklin steered him towards symbolism, in works focused on the interrelation and harmony between human beings and nature, as denoted in The Arcadia and The Golden Age.

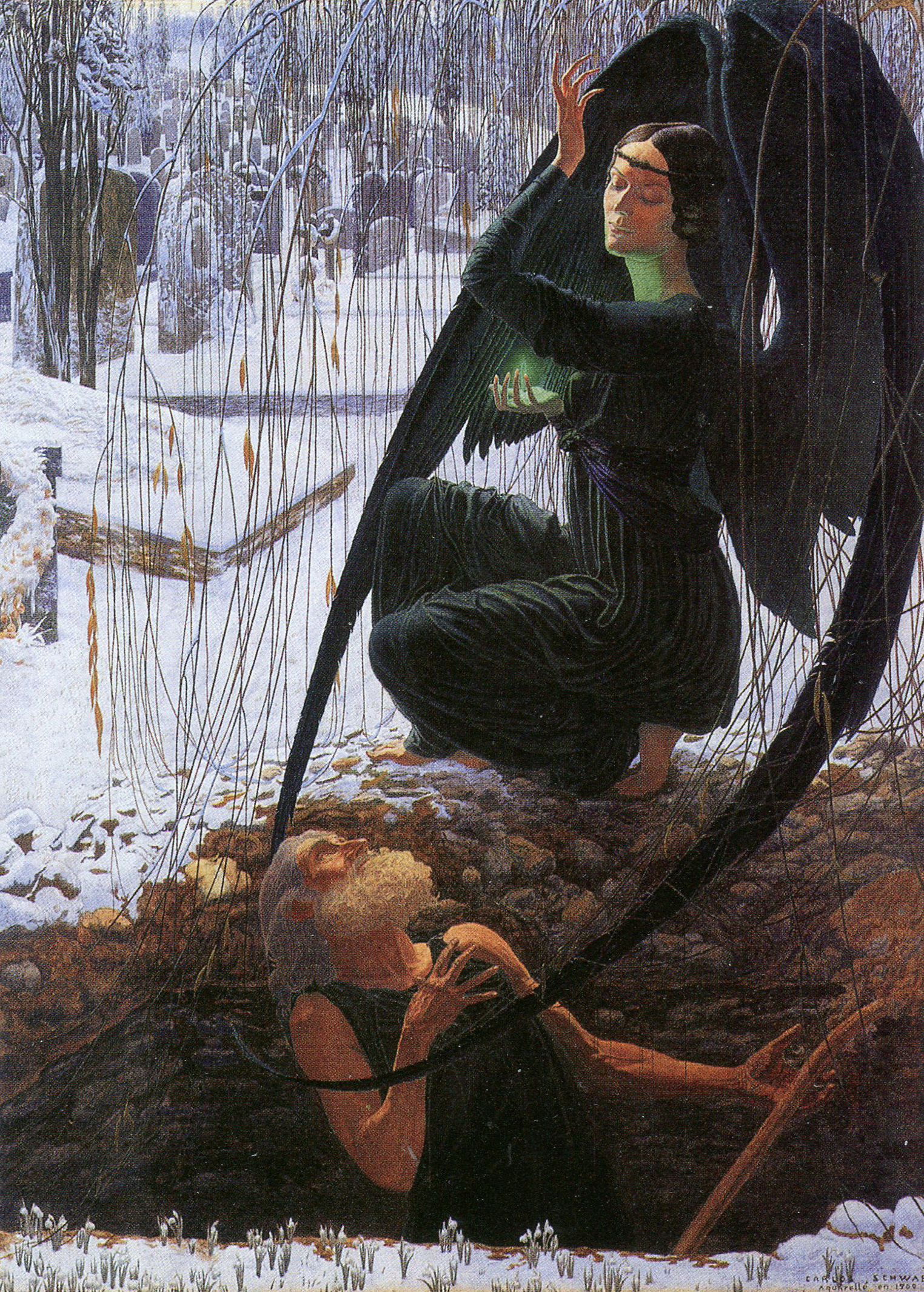
Death and the Gravedigger (1895–1900), by Carlos Schwabe, Louvre Museum, Paris

Max Klinger was a painter, sculptor and engraver. His work shows the influence of Goya, Menzel and Rembrandt, as well as the music of Brahms and Beethoven, and an attraction to the fantastic and disturbing. Of great technical and stylistic complexity, his work is full of fantasy and symbolic allusions. Notable in his pictorial work is his Judgment of Paris (1885–1887, Kunsthistorisches Museum, Vienna), in which he also designed the frame, integrating it into a structured whole. He was more innovative as a graphic artist, especially in etching, in a style that predates surrealism, as denoted in his series Adventures of a Glove (1881), centered on fetishism.

Franz von Stuck was a painter, engraver, sculptor and architect, one of the founders of the Munich Sezession. He developed a decorative style close to modernism, although due to its subject matter it is more symbolist, with an eroticism of torrid sensuality that reflects a concept of woman as the personification of perversity: Sin (1893, Neue Pinakothek, Munich), Kiss of the Sphinx (1895, Szépművészeti Múzeum, Budapest), Salome (1906, Städtische Galerie, Munich). He was a teacher of Vasili Kandinsky, Alexej von Jawlensky and Paul Klee.

Charles Schwabe was the most international of the Germanic artists: born in Germany, he spent his childhood and youth in Switzerland, while as an adult he settled in France, where he was active in the Rosicrucian salons. In his work the Pre-Raphaelite influence is denoted. He had a special predilection for flowers, in whose representation he achieved great mastery, to which he applied a complex symbolism related to the states of mind.

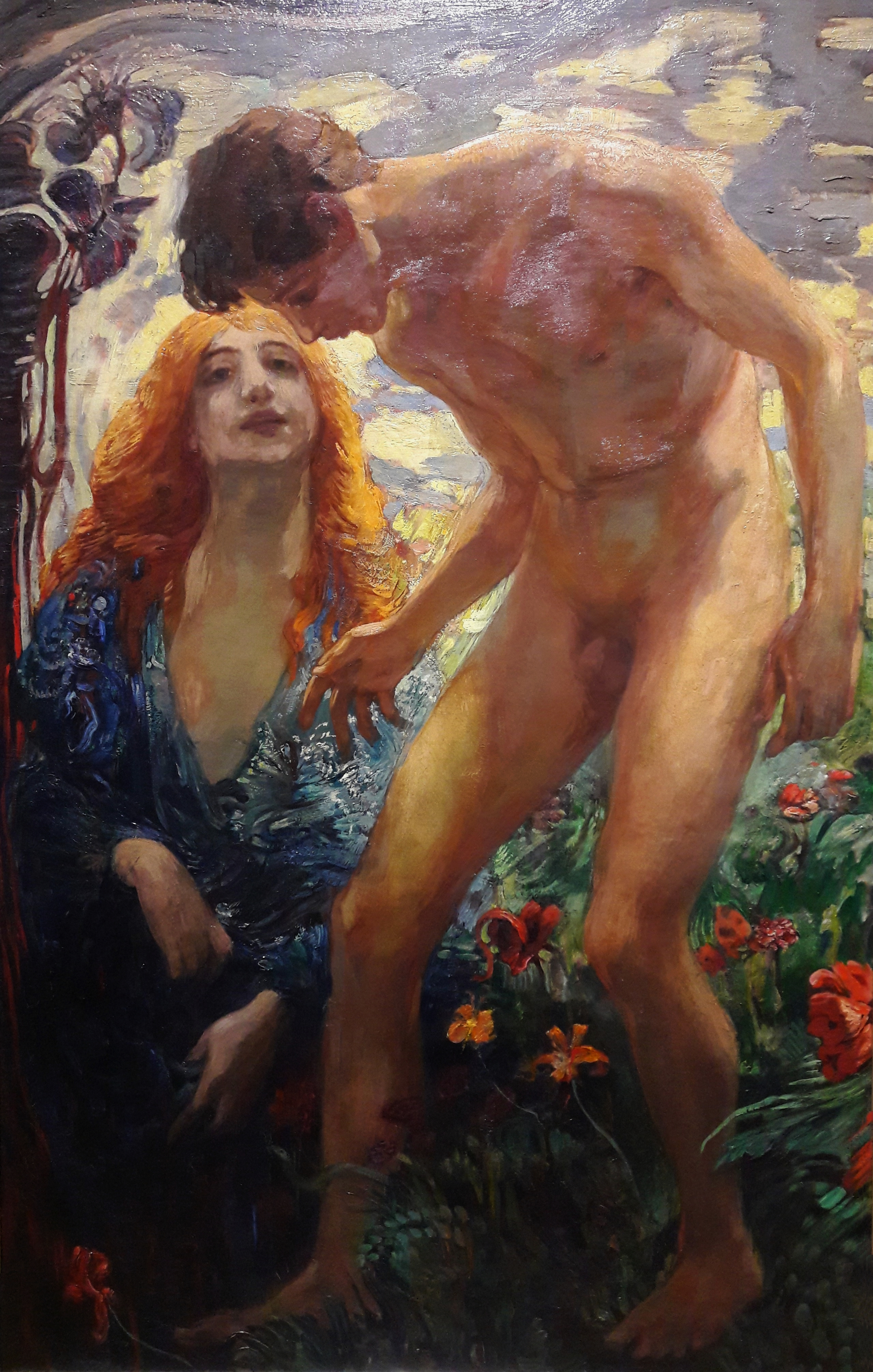
Narcissus (1900), by Ludwig von Hofmann, National Museum of Warsaw

Ludwig von Hofmann studied first in Dresden and Karlsruhe, and completed his training at the Académie Julian in Paris. He was influenced by Puvis de Chavannes and Max Klinger. In his paintings—mainly landscapes—he combined modernist decorativism with symbolist subject matter.

Otto Greiner received an academic education, but during a stay in Italy he met Max Klinger, whose work greatly influenced him. A painter, draughtsman and engraver, his style is characterized by sensuality and refinement, quite close to the bourgeois taste of the time, and with a special inventiveness in its symbolic and allegorical side.

Ferdinand Keller was a painter of a rather academicist cut—he was a professor and director of the Academy of Fine Arts in Karlsruhe—who, thanks to the influence of Böcklin, around 1900 turned to symbolism, especially in landscapes of saturated colors and decorative appearance.

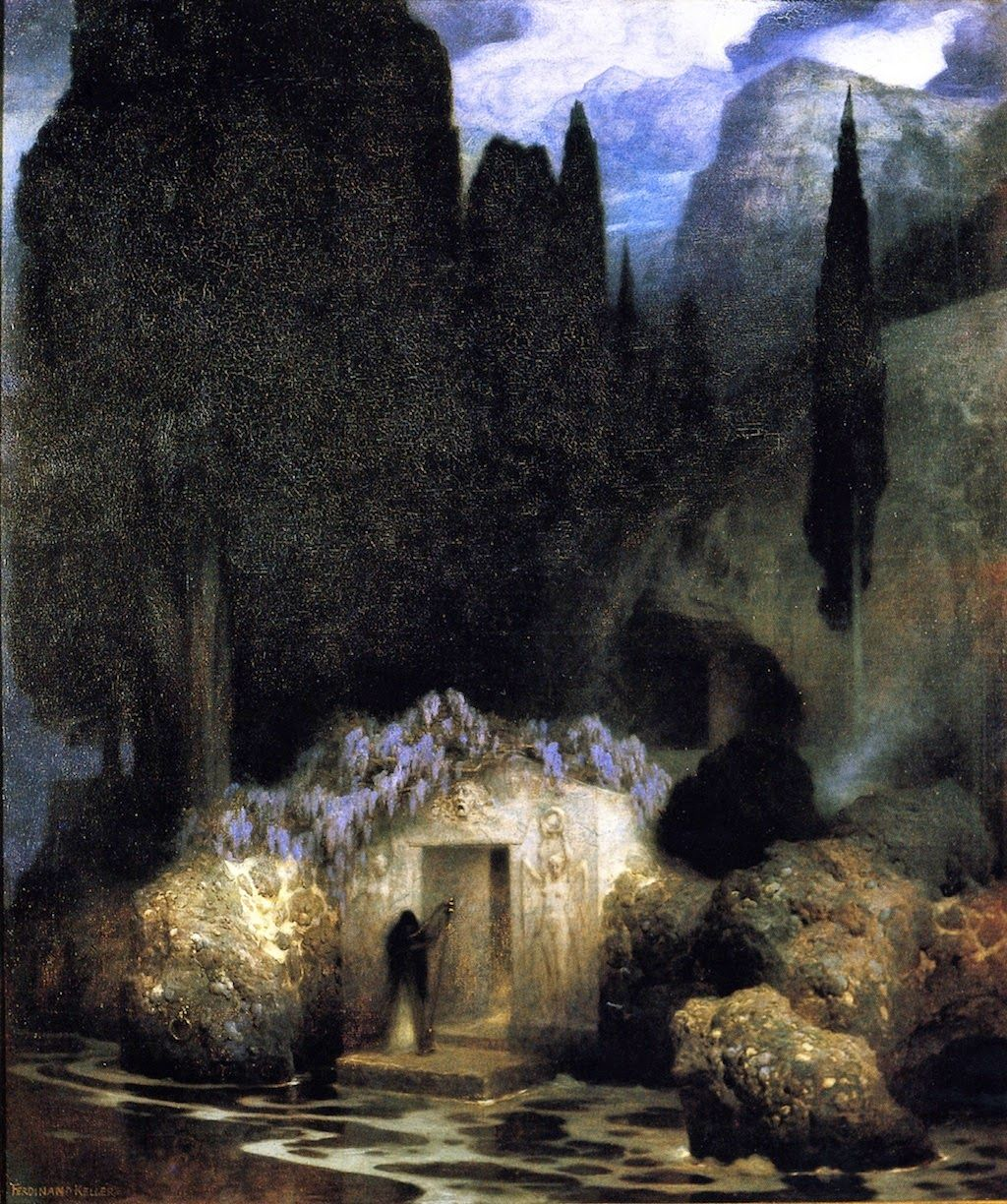
Tomb of Böcklin (1901–1902), by Ferdinand Keller, Staatliche Kunsthalle, Karlsruhe

Franz Marc was influenced by symbolism in his youth. Trained in the academicist environment, on a trip to Paris in 1903 he came into contact with post-impressionism and the Nabis, as well as Gauguin and symbolism. From 1906 he devoted himself to painting animals, in which he found a perfect allegory of natural purity. In 1910 he came into contact with August Macke and Vasili Kandinsky, who introduced him to the expressive and symbolic use of color. He was one of the founders of the group Der Blaue Reiter, with whom he delved into expressionism. He was later interested in Orphism and Futurism, and approached abstraction, although his career was cut short with his death at the front in World War I.

In Switzerland, Arnold Böcklin was a direct heir of German Romanticism and in his landscapes the influence of Caspar David Friedrich is denoted. His themes exalt solitude, sadness, melancholy, death as liberation. His landscapes are ideal, alien to objective reality, but with a somber tone that reflects his inner concerns. He specialized in a theme of fantastic beings, such as nymphs, satyrs, tritons or naiads, with a somewhat morbid style. From his trips to Italy he picked up a taste for mythological themes and the presence of ruins in his works, always with that atmosphere of mystery that characterizes him. His best-known work is The Island of the Dead (1880, Metropolitan Museum of Art, New York), where a pale, cold and whitish light envelops the atmosphere of the island where the boat of Charon is headed. His work influenced Munch, Kandinski, Chirico, and Dalí.

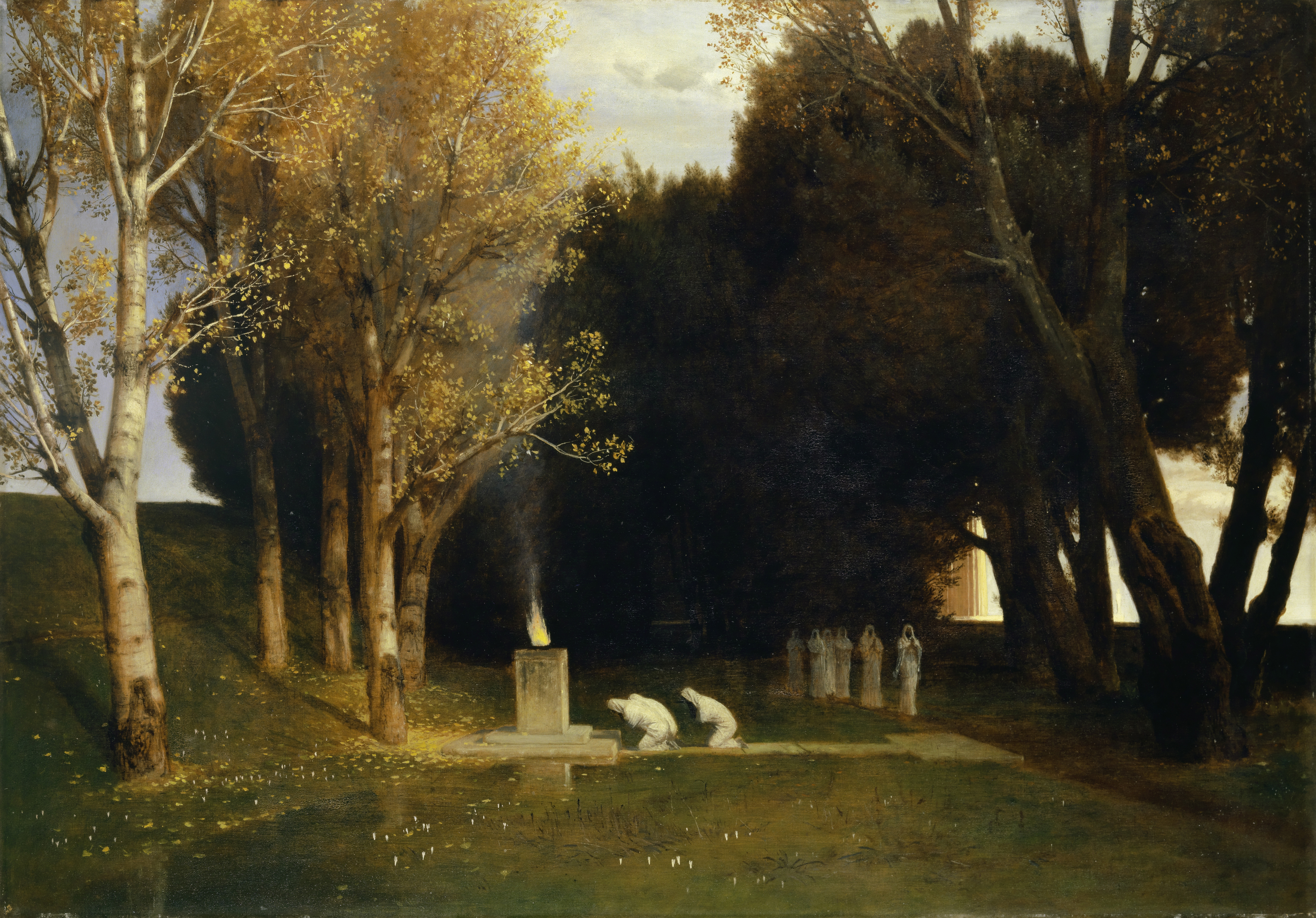
The Sacred Forest (1882), by Arnold Böcklin, Kunstmuseum, Basel

The other major figure in Swiss painting was Ferdinand Hodler, whose style developed from naturalism to a personal one he called "parallelism", characterized by rhythmic schemes in which line, form and color are reproduced repetitively, with simplified and monumental figures. His works are framed in a semi-abstract space, with isolated figures that seem to be cut out on empty landscapes, in which the influence of Puvis de Chavannes is evident. They are stylized, theatrical works, which transcend a strong mysticism, with flat backgrounds from the medieval influence of Holbein. He was also impressed by the work of Velázquez, whom he met on a trip to Madrid in 1878–1879. In Paris in 1890–1891 he became acquainted with the work of Puvis de Chavannes, as well as with Blake and Pre-Raphaelitism. His work The Night (1890) caused a scandal in Geneva, although it was well received in the French capital, especially by the Nabis. In his work, the human figure personifies ideas, spiritual behaviors, and vital rhythms.

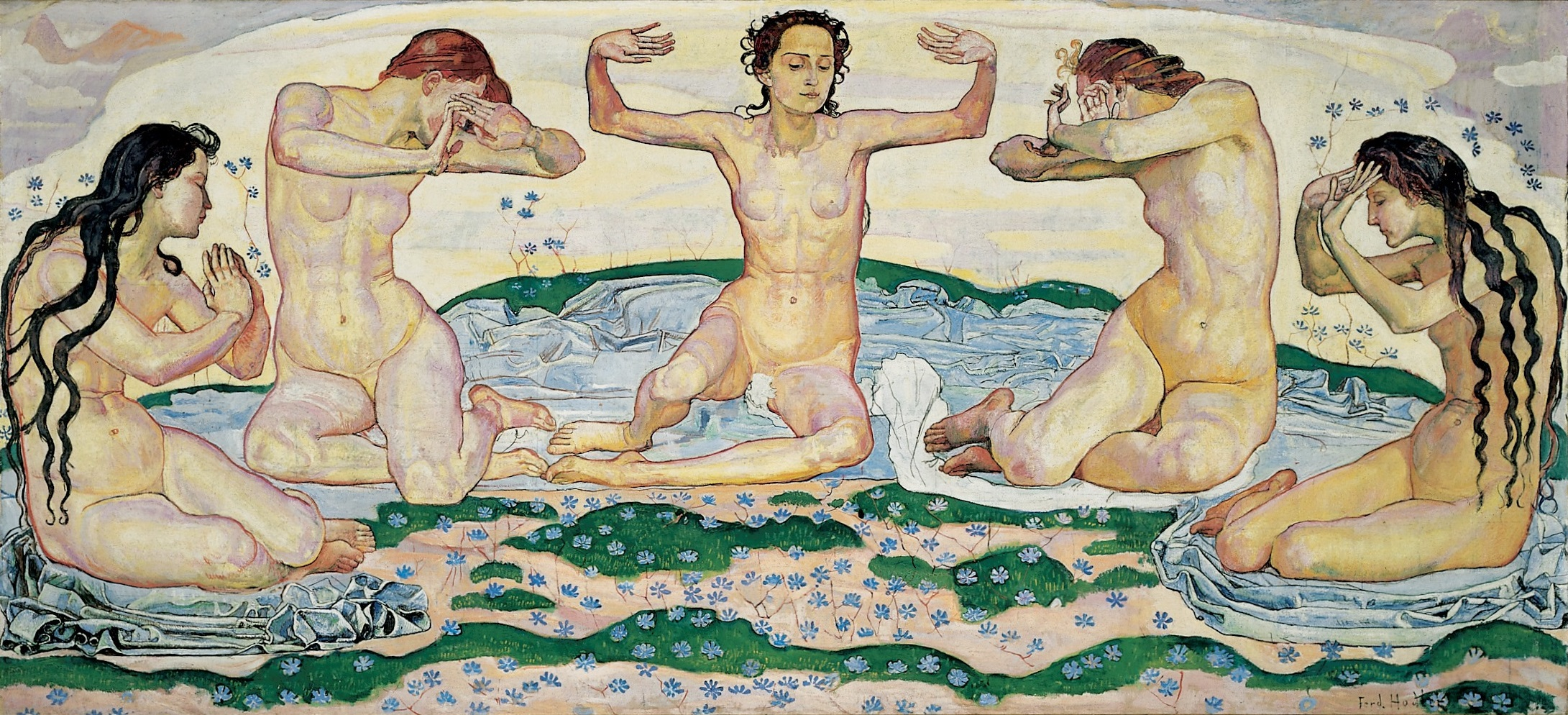
Day (1900), by Ferdinand Hodler, Kunstmuseum, Bern

In Austria, the works by Gustav Klimt stood out. He had an academic training, to lead to a personal style that synthesized impressionism, modernism and symbolism. He had a preference for mural painting, with an allegorical theme with a tendency towards eroticism, and with a decorative style populated with arabesques, butterfly wings or peacocks, and with a taste for the golden color that gave his works an intense luminosity. Son of a goldsmith father, he studied at the School of Applied Arts in Vienna, which explains the intense decorativism of his work. His style is also influenced by the Byzantine mosaics of Ravenna, a city he visited in 1903. In his work he recreated a fantasy world of strong erotic component, with a classicist composition of ornamental style, where sex and death are intertwined, dealing without taboos sexuality in aspects such as pregnancy, lesbianism or masturbation. Klimt's rococo sumptuousness enclosed in the background the multiple concerns that populated his inner world: hope, dream, death, the longing for eternity. His major influence early in his career was Hans Makart, a pompier painter fashionable in the 1870s and 1880s, as well as the academicists Gérôme and Boulanger, or the neo-Hellenists Leighton and Alma-Tadema. He was later influenced by Gustave Moreau, Whistler, Beardsley, Jan Toorop and Franz von Stuck, which led him to abandon academicism. He was also influenced by Péladan and the Rosicrucians, especially in terms of sexual absolutism. A final point of reference would be Japanese art. All this led him to an original combination of symbolism and modernism, which he developed in works such as the ceiling of the Aula Magna of the University of Vienna (1900–1907, destroyed in 1945), Beethoven's Frieze (1902, Österreichische Galerie Belvedere, Vienna), The Three Ages of Woman (1905, National Gallery of Modern Art, Rome), The Kiss (1907–1908, Österreichische Galerie Belvedere, Vienna) and the frieze of the Stoclet Palace (1911, Brussels).

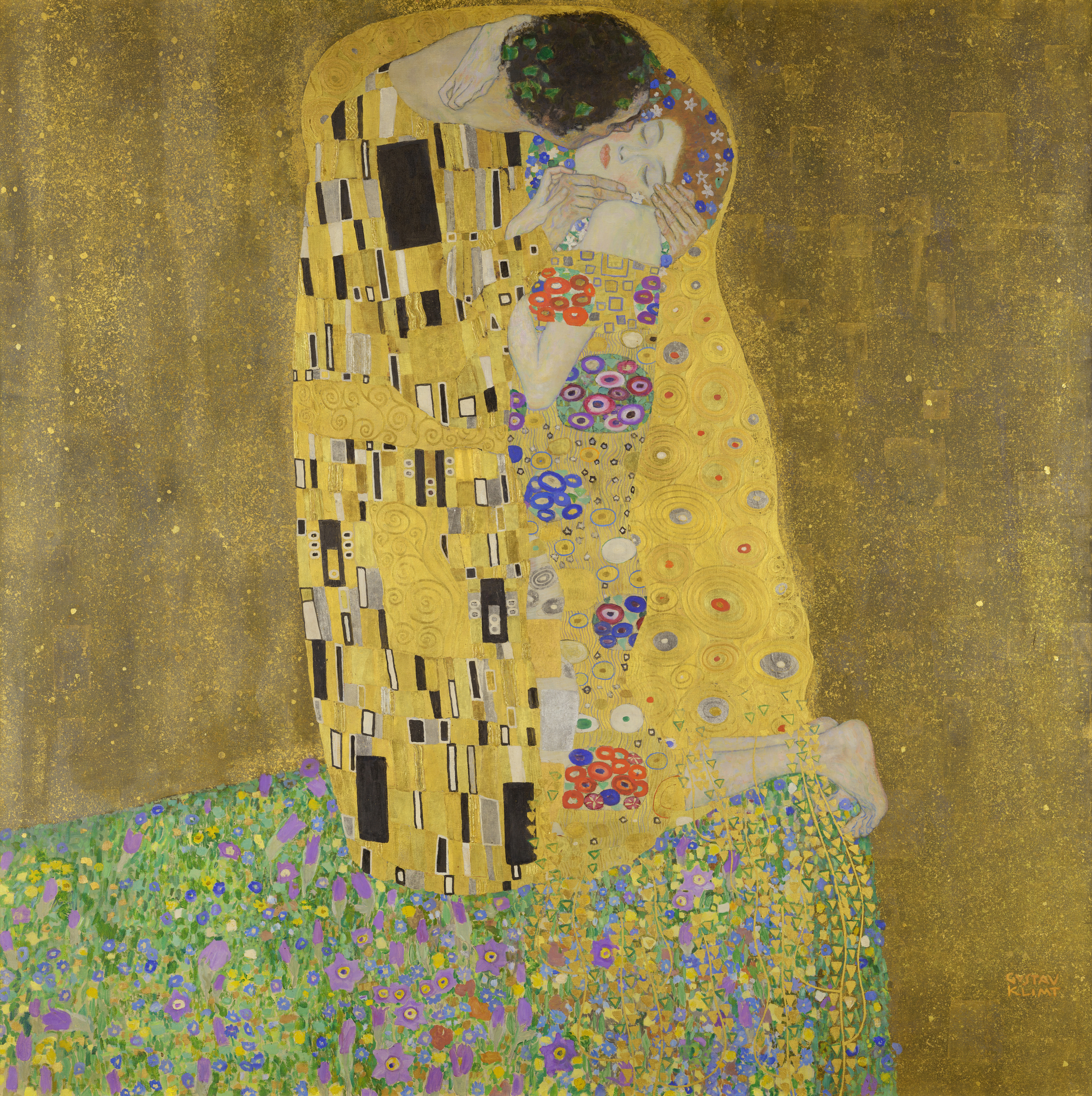
The Kiss (1907–1908), by Gustav Klimt, Österreichische Galerie Belvedere, Vienna

Alfred Kubin was above all a draftsman: he expressed in his drawings a terrifying world of loneliness and despair, populated by monsters, skeletons, insects and hideous animals, with explicit references to sex, where the female presence plays an evil and disturbing role. Influenced by Goya, Munch, Ensor, Redon and by his most direct ascendant, Max Klinger, his work reflects existential anguish—he attempted suicide but his gun jammed—and a deep despair that was partially cured in the practice of art. He illustrated works by Poe, Wilde, Nerval and Strindberg. He later ascribed to expressionism and was a member of Der Blaue Reiter, as well as a friend of Franz Marc and Paul Klee.

Symbolism is also discernible in the early work of two young artists who later excelled in Expressionism: Egon Schiele and Oskar Kokoschka. Schiele was a disciple of Klimt. His work revolved around a theme based on sexuality, loneliness and isolation, with a certain air of voyeurism, with very explicit works for which he was even imprisoned, accused of pornography. Devoted mainly to drawing, he gave an essential role to the line, with which he based his compositions, with stylized figures immersed in an oppressive, tense space. He recreated a reiterative human typology, with an elongated, schematic canon, far from naturalism, with vivid, exalted colors, emphasizing the linear character, the outline.

Kokoschka was influenced by Van Gogh and the classical past, mainly the Baroque (Rembrandt) and the Venetian school (Tintoretto, Veronese). He was also linked to the figure of Klimt, as well as the architect Adolf Loos. His first works had a medieval and symbolist style close to the Nabis or the blue period of Picasso. Later he created his own personal style, visionary and tormented, in compositions where space takes on great importance, a dense, sinuous space, where the figures are submerged, floating in it immersed in a centrifugal current that produces a spiral movement. His subject matter used to be love, sexuality and death, and sometimes he also painted portraits and landscapes.

== United Kingdom ==
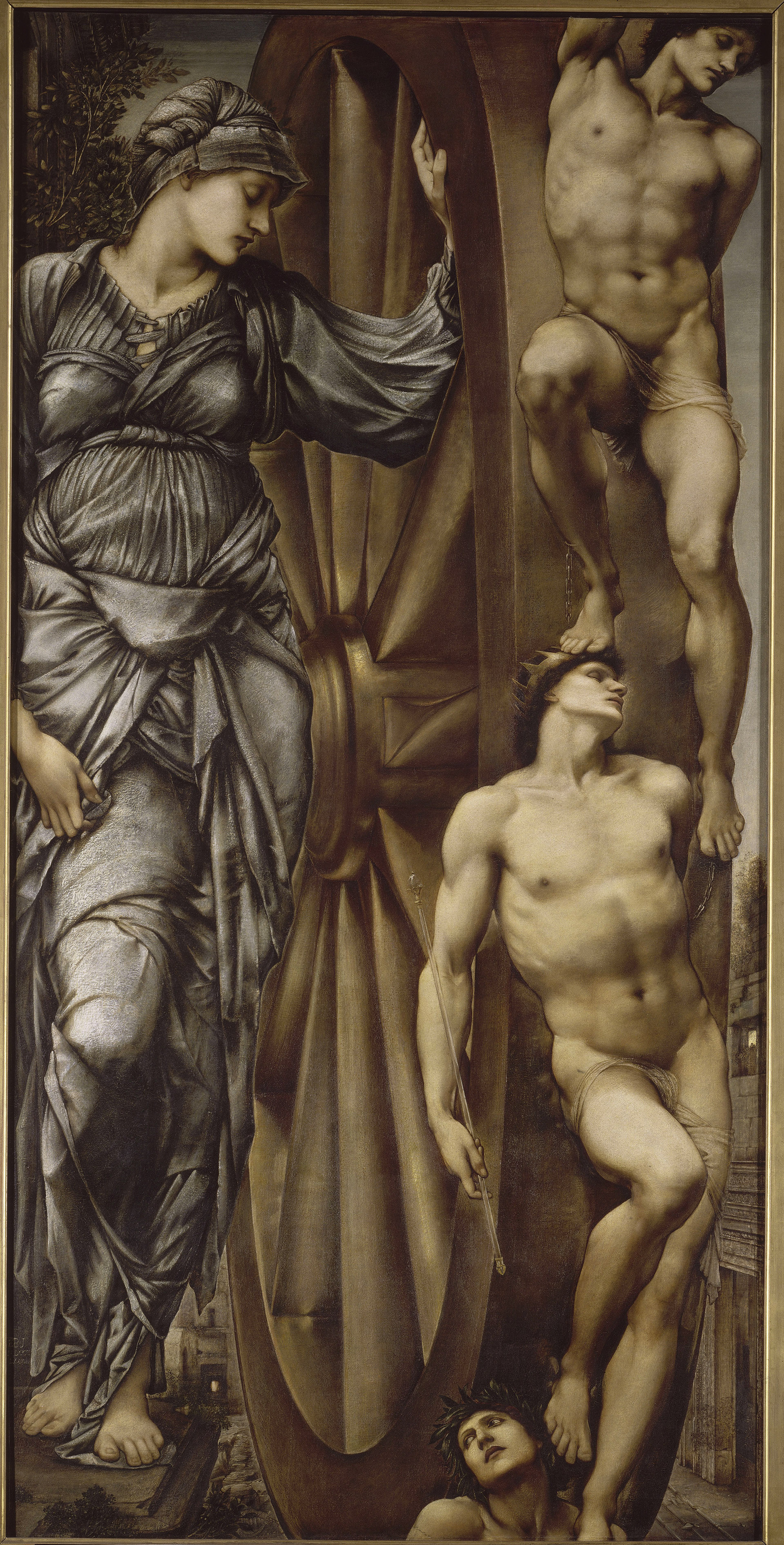
Wheel of Fortune (1883), by Edward Burne-Jones, Musée d'Orsay, Paris

English Symbolist art was greatly influenced by the literature of Oscar Wilde and Edgar Allan Poe. Here the imprint left by Pre-Raphaelitism had great relevance, in fact some Pre-Raphaelite artists switched to Symbolism in their late work, such as Edward Burne-Jones. Starting from Pre-Raphaelite medievalism and with a special influence from Renaissance artists such as Leonardo, Mantegna, Botticelli, Signorelli and Michelangelo, Burne-Jones elaborated his own language of great formal inventiveness, experimenting with new techniques and formats: he had a special predilection for tall, narrow formats, with elongated figures and unnatural spaces. As with many other Symbolist artists, some of his figures have an androgynous aspect, such as his Aphrodite from Pygmalion: The Fires of Divinity (1878, Birmingham Museum and Art Gallery).

Aubrey Vincent Beardsley was primarily a draughtsman, characterized by a sinuous line style very close to modernism, although he is considered a symbolist because of his choice of subjects, often with strong erotic content. His drawing was influenced by Greek vase painting, with a decorative and somewhat perverse style, rhythmic and elegant, frivolous and tending towards the grotesque. Other influences included Burne-Jones, Whistler, Mantegna, Botticelli, Rococo and Japanese art. A prototypical example of a dandy, his favorite subjects were also some of the most recurrent themes of symbolism: the femme fatale, the Arthurian cycle and the Wagnerian artistic universe. In 1891 he illustrated Oscar Wilde's Salome, where he transformed ugliness and perversion into beauty and dreamlike suggestion, bringing together the modernist line with symbolist idealism in one of the best works of fin-de-siècle art. According to Arthur Symons, "Beardsley is the satirist of an age that lacks convictions of its own and therefore, like Baudelaire, cannot paint hell without pointing to a present paradise as a counterpart." He died of tuberculosis at the age of twenty-six.

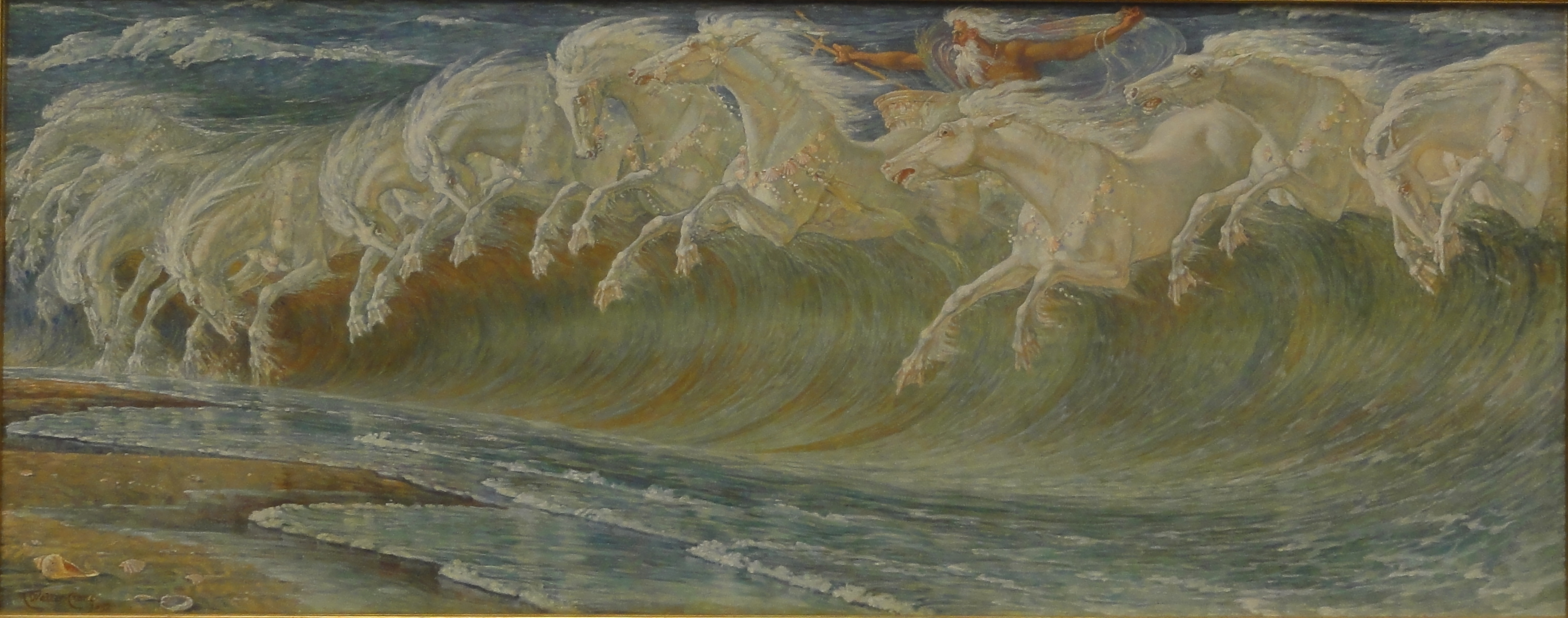
Neptune's Horses (1892), by Walter Crane, State Painting Collections, Munich

Walter Crane was a painter, illustrator, typographer and designer of ceramics, stained glass, textiles, jewelry and posters. He began his artistic career in the Pre-Raphaelite style, influenced by the Romantic William Blake, whose style based on vibrant lines and arabesques had a powerful influence on English modernism and symbolism. Also decisive in his work were the Florentine Quattrocento and Japanese woodcut. He was involved in the Arts & Crafts movement, of whose Exhibition Society he was a member of the board of directors. He was also an important theorist and his treatise Line and Form (1900) was widely read in the United Kingdom and the United States. He focused on literary and mythological themes, with a language of symbols of a fabulous and dreamlike cut in which metamorphosed figures and the elements of nature shown in all their power and splendor are prominent, as in his Neptune's Horses (1892, Staatsgemäldesammlungen, Munich).

Charles Ricketts was a painter, sculptor, engraver, set designer, writer and art collector, but it was in his illustrations that he was most clearly symbolist, as in those he made for Oscar Wilde's poem The Sphinx. In his early days he was especially devoted to illustration and it was not until 1904 that he began to devote himself more fully to painting.

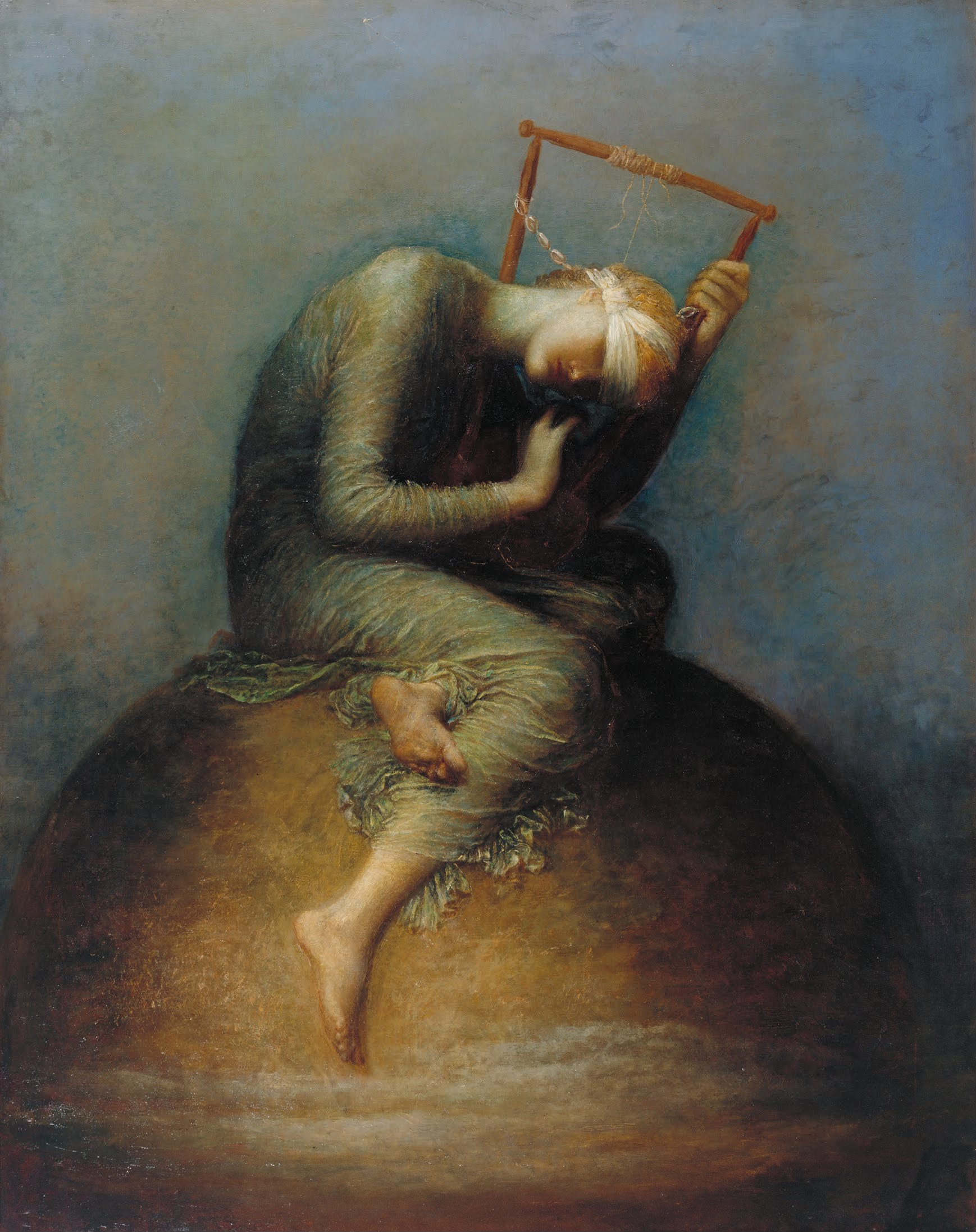
Hope (1886), by George Frederick Watts, Tate Gallery, London

George Frederick Watts sought in his works a "poetry painted on canvas", a mysterious painting influenced by Dante Gabriel Rossetti, Edward Burne-Jones and Fernand Khnopff, as well as Titian and Joseph Mallord William Turner. His aim was to paint "great ideas", seeking concordance between painting, literature and music, which was reflected in a series of mystical and allegorical images of visionary origin, with a tendency to the aesthetics of the sublime. His best-known image is the allegory of Hope (1886, Tate Gallery, London), in the form of a girl dressed in a tunic, with a Pre-Raphaelite appearance, seated on a globe, with a lyre in her hands and blindfolded, alluding to blind hope. However, the melancholic image of the young girl provokes more a sense of hopelessness than hope, playing with typical symbolist ambiguity.

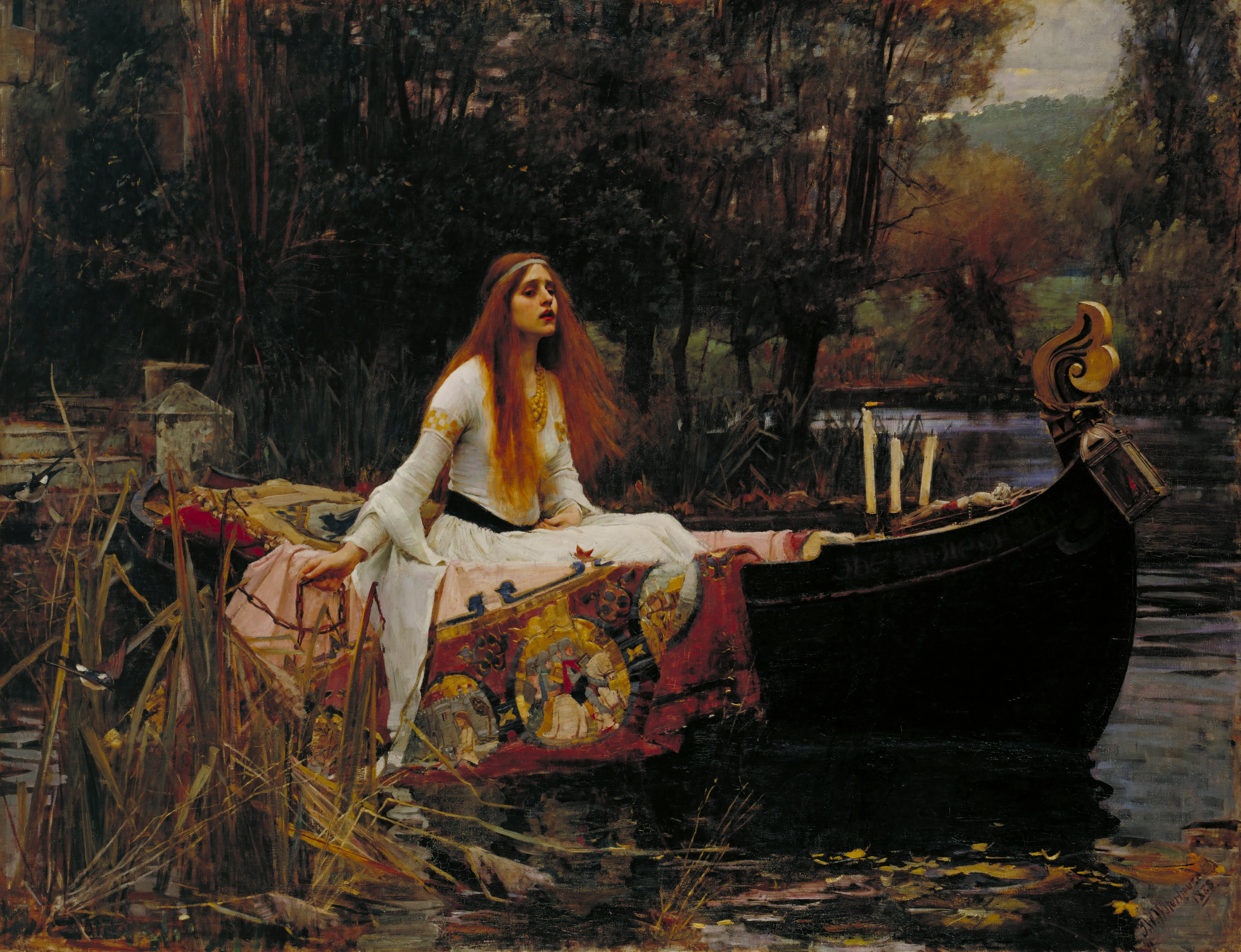
The Lady of Shalott (1888), by John William Waterhouse, Tate Gallery, Londres

Frederic Leighton was an academicist painter, but on many occasions he showed a taste close to symbolism in the choice of subjects. His portraits of cold and distant women, but beautiful and sensual, obtained a remarkable fame in his time. A good example is The Spirit of the Summit (1894, Auckland Art Gallery Toi o Tāmaki, Auckland), in which a beautiful young woman dressed in a classical robe observes a night firmament seated on a throne on a mountain.

John William Waterhouse was also preferably academicist, but from 1880 he moved towards a Pre-Raphaelite-influenced symbolism based on literary themes, with a romantic and dreamy, sensual and visually rich style: The Lady of Shalott (1888, Tate Gallery, London), Hylas and the Nymphs (1896, City Art Gallery, Manchester).

Charles Conder, who lived much of his life in France, where he became part of the Symbolist and Rosicrucian milieu and was a friend of Bonnard and Toulouse-Lautrec, developed a body of work powerfully influenced by the rococo painter Jean-Antoine Watteau whose style Conder sought to translate into symbolism, producing a series of works—mostly inspired by Arthurian legends—set in the typical scenes of Watteauian fête galante.

Also noteworthy is the work of the sisters Frances and Margaret Macdonald, members of the so-called Glasgow School, a modernist circle devoted primarily to architecture and the decorative arts led by the architect Charles Rennie Mackintosh—Margaret's husband. His designs were aimed more at decoration, but are reflective of a symbolism of an abstracting tendency denoting the influence of Jan Toorop.

== Scandinavian countries ==
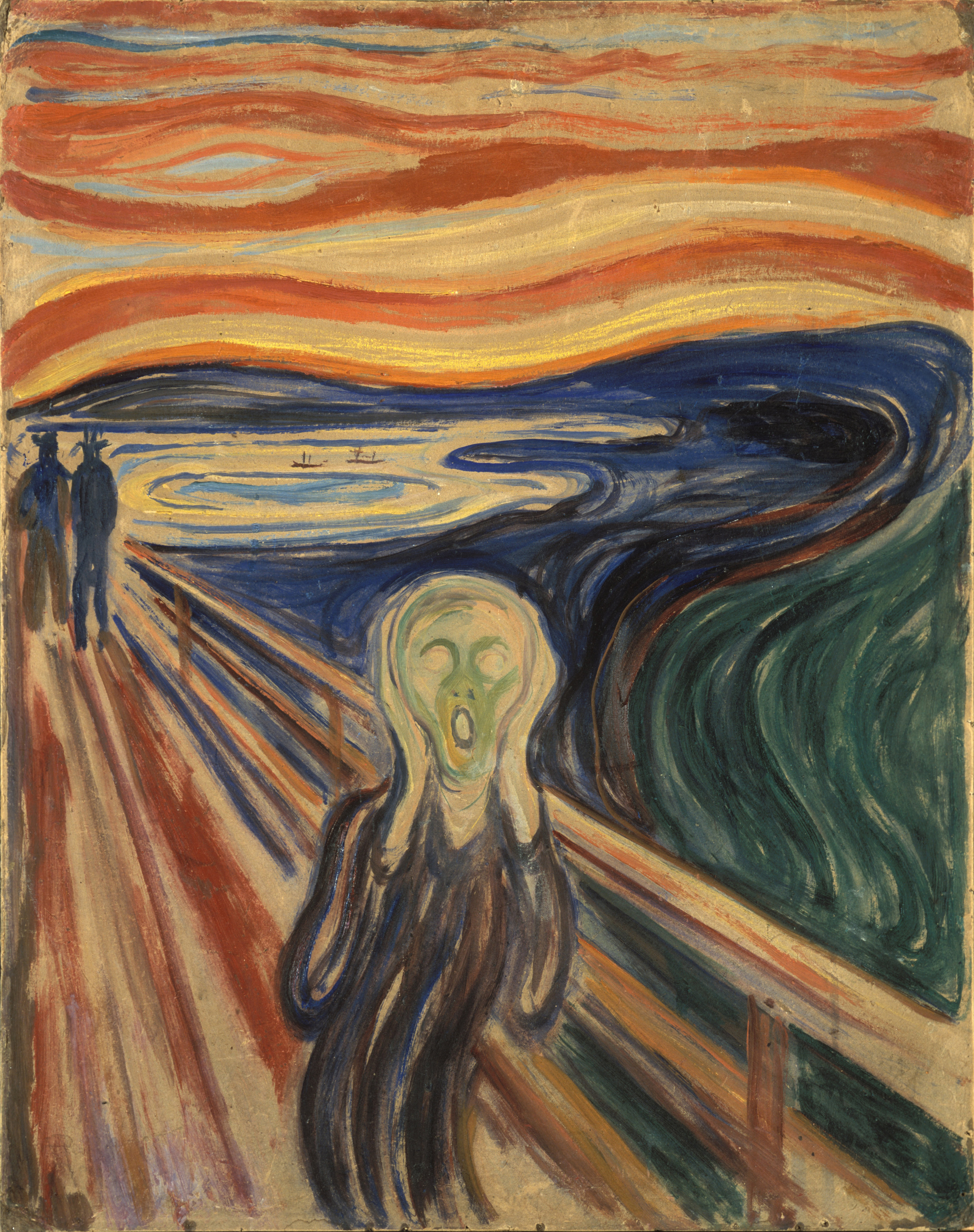
The Scream (1893), by Edvard Munch, National Gallery of Norway, Oslo

As in other countries, the interrelation between literature and art in Scandinavia was intense, and writers such as Bjørnstjerne Bjørnson, Henrik Ibsen and August Strindberg were clear references of Scandinavian symbolism.

The main Nordic exponent of symbolism was the Norwegian Edvard Munch, who created in his work a personal universe reflecting his existential anxieties, in which the influence of Nietzschean philosophy is denoted. His work revolves around his personal obsessions regarding love and sex, as well as his conception of society as a hostile and oppressive environment. After his beginnings in naturalism and impressionism, his painting The Sick Girl (1885) initiates his most personal path, marked by the expression of the deepest feelings—on one occasion he commented that his objective was to "dissect the soul". On a trip to Paris in 1889 he was influenced by Van Gogh, Gauguin, Redon and Toulouse-Lautrec, while the vision of a great city of rectilinear avenues inspired him a series of works on the loneliness of the human being in the midst of large crowds of people (Sunset on Karl Johan Street, 1892, Bergen Kunstmuseum, Bergen; The Scream, 1893, Norwegian National Gallery, Oslo; Anxiety, 1894, Munch Museum, Oslo). Gradually he became more enclosed in his obsessions (eroticism, loneliness, death) and moved away from realistic representation to transcribe his feelings in images, in which color no longer describes, but symbolizes, becomes a language of inner expression; the line is sometimes curved, rhythmic and undulating, sometimes excessively straight; and the atmosphere is transformed into violent whirlwinds that envelop the figures to emphasize their loneliness. The feminine image in his works is part of the Pre-Raphaelite influence but more abstracted, in which more than the physical description he is concerned with psychological introspection (Puberty, 1886, National Gallery of Norway, Oslo). Munch's work connected with the expressionism of the early 20th century, of which he was considered one of its main masters.

In Norway, Halfdan Egedius and Harald Sohlberg also stood out. Egedius was a precocious talent who died at the age of twenty-two. He focused basically on scenes of peasant life and Norse sagas. Sohlberg focused on landscapes of mysterious tone evoking human loneliness.

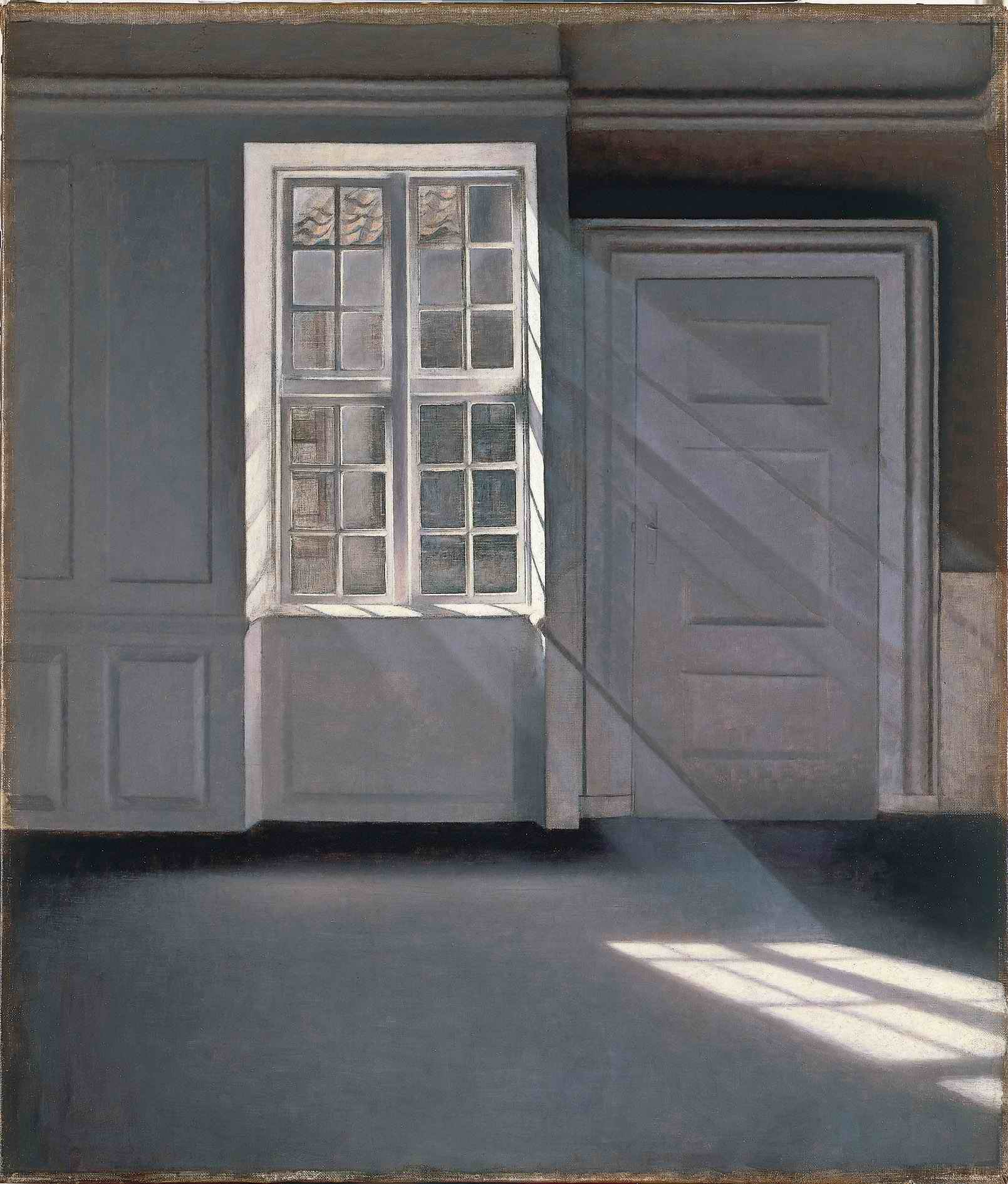
Støvkornenes dans i solstrålerne (1900), by Vilhelm Hammershøi, Ordrupgaard Museum, Copenhagen

In Denmark, Vilhelm Hammershøi and Jens Ferdinand Willumsen stood out. Hammershøi was a virtuoso in the handling of light, which he considered the main protagonist of his works. Most of his paintings were set in interior spaces with lights filtered through doors or windows, with figures generally with their backs turned. Willumsen evolved from realism to symbolism and, finally, expressionism. He developed a personal style drawing on the influence of Gauguin, with a taste for bright colors, as in After the Storm (1905, National Gallery of Norway, Oslo), a marine with a dazzling sun that seems to burst into the sky.

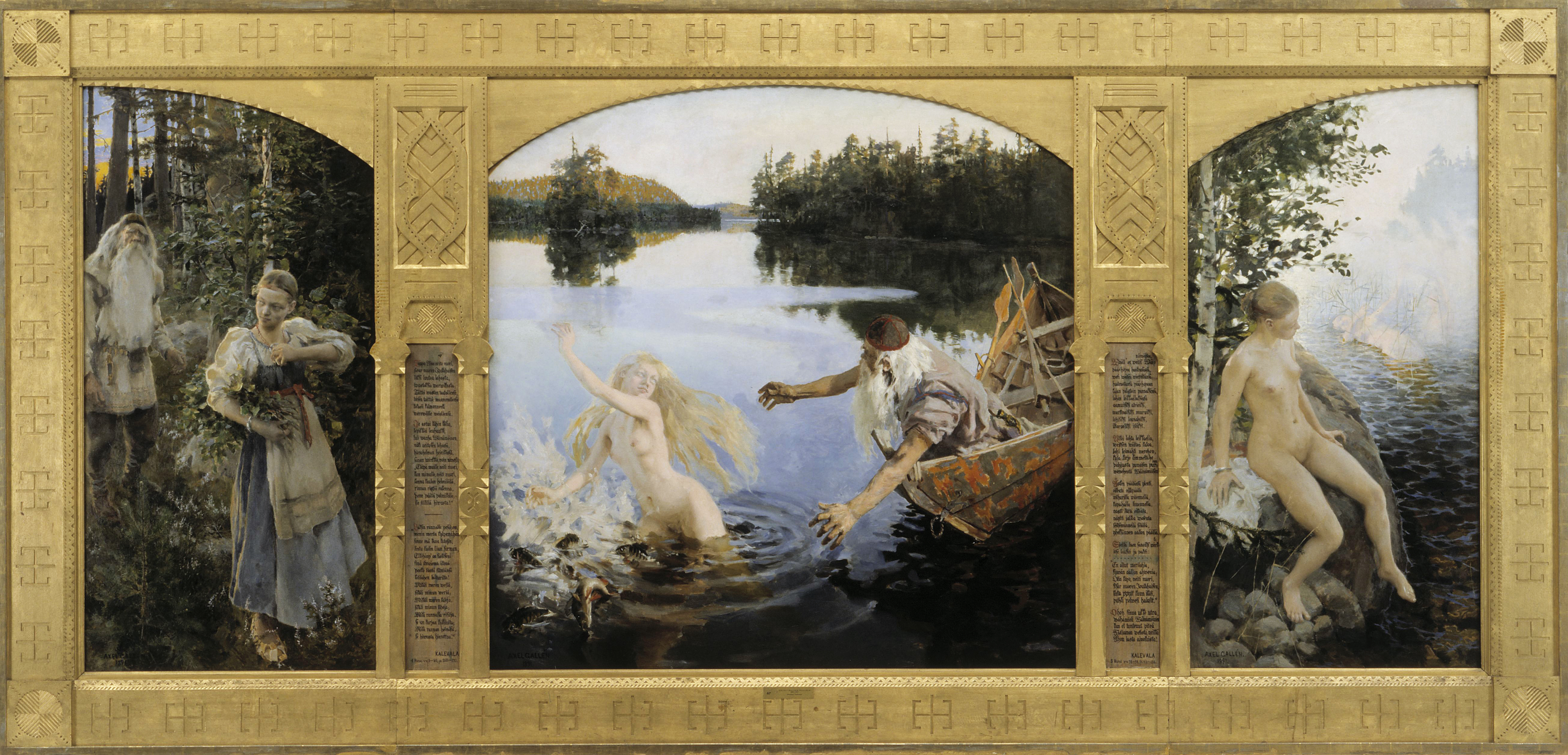
The Aino Myth triptych (1891), by Akseli Gallen-Kallela, Ateneumin Taidemuseum, Helsinki

In Finland the leading figure was Akseli Gallen-Kallela, trained at the Helsinki School of Fine Arts and at the Parisian Académie Julian, where he was a student of Fernand Cormon. In the French capital he became acquainted with the work of Puvis de Chavannes and Jules Bastien-Lepage, who made a deep impression on him. Back in his homeland he developed a naturalistic style work based on the tradition and epic legends of Finnish folklore, such as the epic Kalevala. His style combined decorativism and expressiveness, with sharp contours and flat colors.

A disciple of Gallen-Kallela was Hugo Simberg, who was also influenced by Böcklin and Burne-Jones. His work, populated by strange animals and evil spirits, focuses on death, which he often depicts performing everyday tasks such as tending a garden (The Garden of Death, 1896, Ateneumin Taidemuseum, Helsinki).

Another Finnish artist was Magnus Enckell, who was influenced by Manet, Carrière and Puvis de Chavannes during a stay in Paris, as well as by Péladan and Édouard Schuré in the spiritual field. Later he traveled through Italy, Germany and Switzerland, where he was influenced by Böcklin. With the turn of the century he broke with symbolism.

In Sweden, Ernst Abraham Josephson stood out. He began in academicist painting, but from 1881—perhaps due to psychic illness—his work moved into symbolism, generally of a mystical and somewhat paranoid bent. Settled in Brittany, he engaged in spiritualist practices in which he believed he communicated with the Swedish mystic Emanuel Swedenborg. He later lived in Stockholm retired from public life. He produced portraits, landscapes and paintings inspired by Norse legends and classical mythology, such as the paintings dedicated to the undines. His style is characterized by a highly contrasted chromaticism, which influenced Fauvism and Expressionism. He was the leader of the secessionist movement Konstnärförbundet.

Carl Fredrik Hill was initiated in impressionism after settling in Paris in 1873. However, in 1878 he was diagnosed with schizophrenia and, once back in his native country, his style took a great turn and his production—especially in drawing—focused on fantastic and hallucinatory visions, such as unreal landscapes, imaginary architectures, strange animals and apocalyptic visions. Almost unknown during his lifetime, an exhibition in Lund in 1911 revealed him as one of the most gifted Swedish artists of his time.

It is also worth mentioning August Strindberg, a distinguished writer and playwright who also dabbled in painting. His early works were close to the schools of Düsseldorf and Barbizon school but, after a period of inactivity, between 1890 and 1895 and 1900–1907 he approached symbolism, with a subject matter often centered on the sea and a technique that preludes the tachism of the 1940s–1950s.

== Italy ==
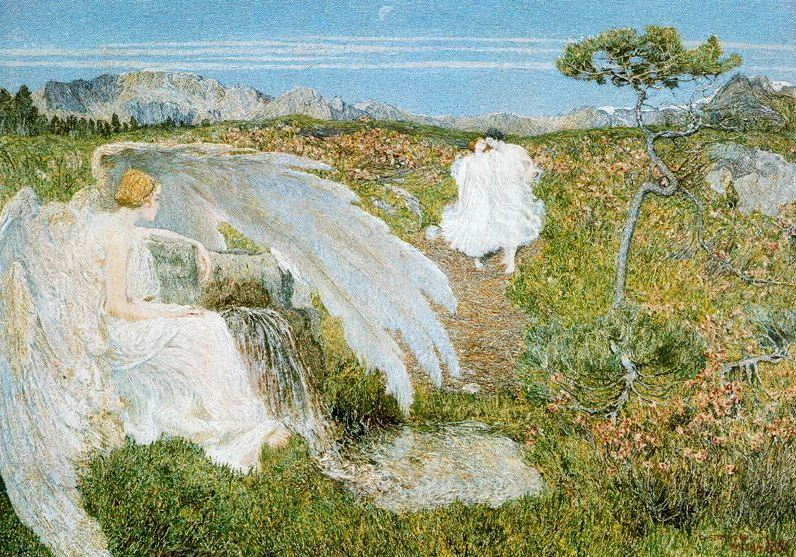
Love at the Fountains of Life (1896), by Giovanni Segantini, Galleria Civica d'Arte Moderna, Milan

As in other countries, Italian art of the period was linked to writers such as Gabriele D'Annunzio and magazines such as Il Convito. The major center of diffusion of Symbolist art was Milan, an important industrial and commercial center in the north of the country.

Giovanni Segantini was a painter difficult to classify, of neo-Impressionist workmanship but with a choice of themes often related to symbolism, in which the Pre-Raphaelite imprint is perceptible. He was interested in literature and philosophy: among his favorite authors were Goethe, Nietzsche, Maeterlinck and D'Annunzio, and he was interested in Eastern philosophy, especially Hindu philosophy. His most symbolist period began in 1891, with a series of allegorical works marked by a decadentist spirituality (The Angel of Life, 1894, Galleria Civica d'Arte Moderna, Milan). In 1894 he retired to the high Alpine mountains, in search of a more personal relationship with nature, as well as the desire for solitude and meditation. His technique became divisionist but his subject matter became more symbolic, seeking in nature a latent religiosity (Triptych of the Alps: nature, life and death, 1896–1899, Segantini Museum, Saint-Moritz).

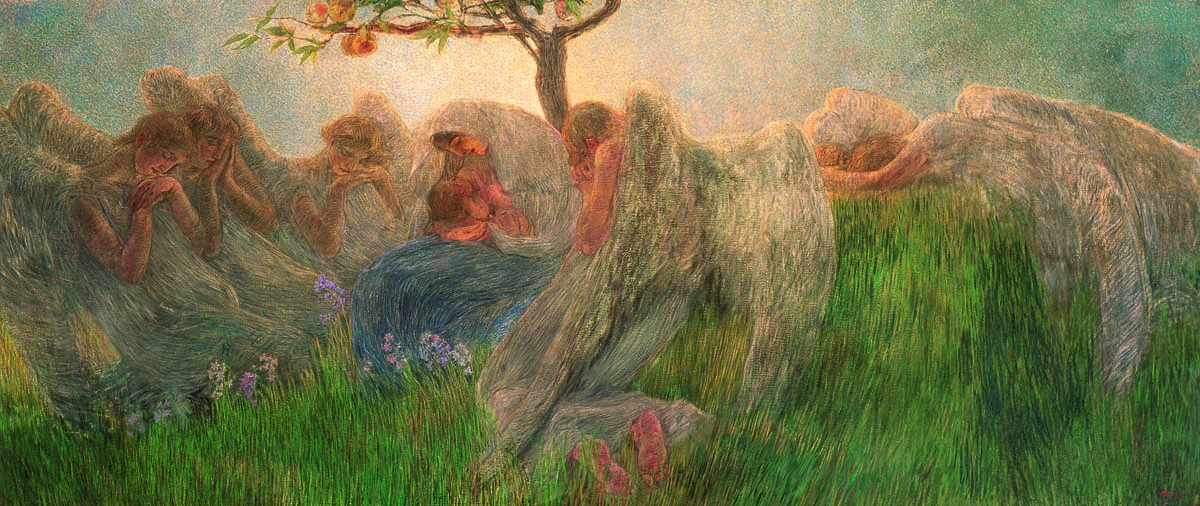
Maternità (1891), by Gaetano Previati, Banco Popular de Novara

Gaetano Previati developed an allegorical and sentimental style, much admired by the Futurists. Initiated in Scapigliatura, which oriented him towards romantic themes, from 1890 his technique became divisionist, but his themes became more idealistic and closer to symbolism, with some influence of Rops and Redon. His work Maternity (1891, Popular Bank of Novara) caused great controversy in his country, but earned him an invitation to the Salon de la Rose + Croix in Paris. His style is characterized by a lively chromaticism of intense luminosity and anti-naturalistic aspect: Triptych of the Day (1907, Milan Chamber of Commerce), The Fall of the Angels (1912–1913, National Gallery of Modern Art, Rome).

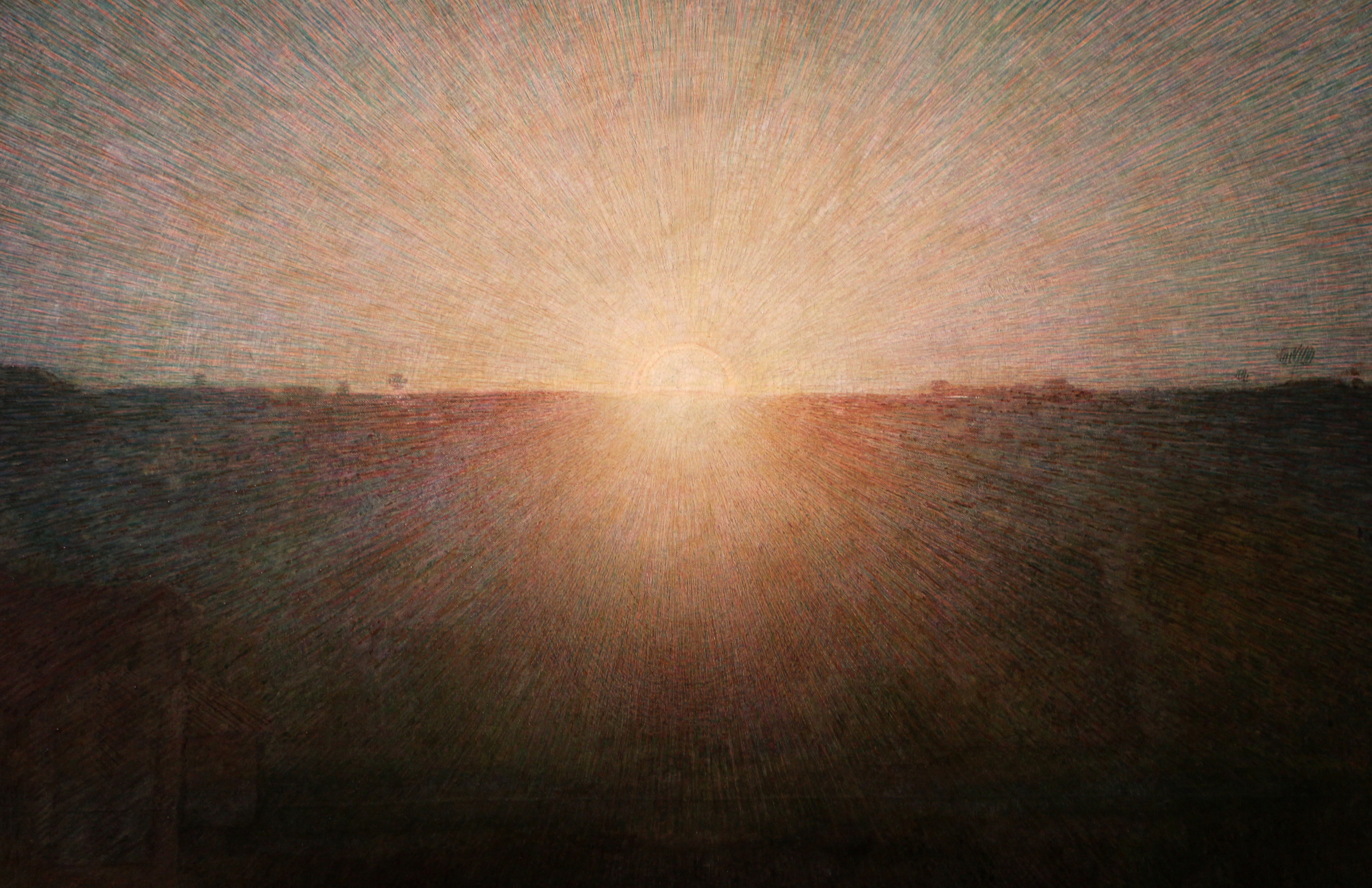
The Sun (1903–1904), by Giuseppe Pellizza da Volpedo, National Gallery of Modern Art, Rome

Giuseppe Pellizza da Volpedo, trained in the divisionist environment, evolved to a personal style marked by an intense and vibrant light, whose starting point is his work Lost Hopes (1894, Ponti-Grün collection, Rome). In The Sun (1903–1904, National Gallery of Modern Art, Rome) he portrayed a refulgent dawn light that peeks over a mountainous horizon and seems to burst into a myriad of rays that scatter in all directions, with a symbolic reading that points to the artist's social and political commitment, since the rising sun was taken by socialism as a metaphor for the new society to which this ideology aspired.

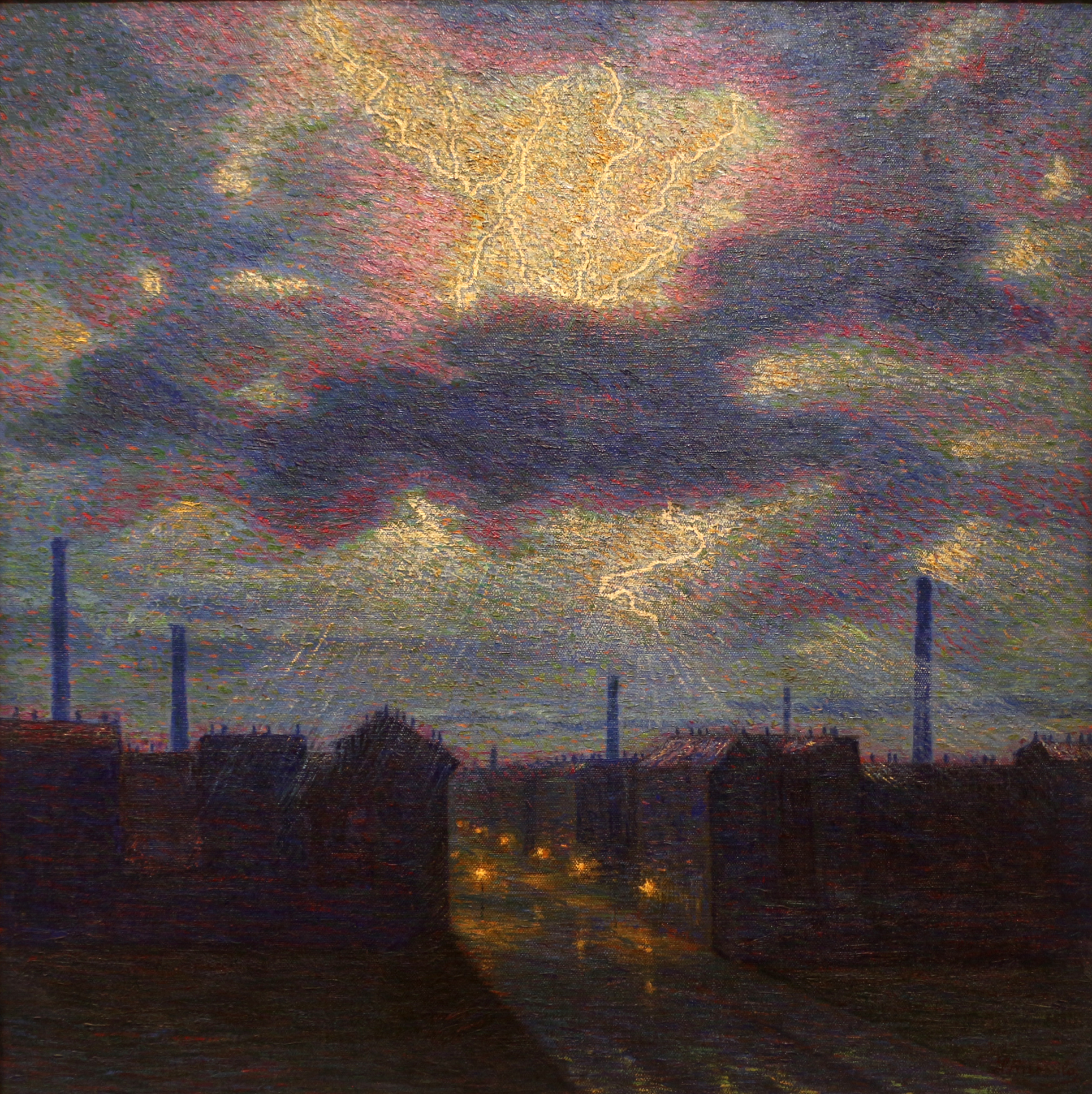
Lightning (1910), by Luigi Russolo, Galleria Nazionale d'Arte Moderna, Rome

Alberto Martini was above all an illustrator, considered the best draftsman of Italian symbolism. Influenced by Dürer, Cranach, Moreau and Redon, his themes focused on the fantastic, grotesque and macabre. He illustrated works by Dante, Boccaccio, Edgar Allan Poe, Mallarmé, Verlaine and Rimbaud. His dreamlike and psychologically introspective work influenced Surrealism, whose artists considered him a forerunner.

Giulio Aristide Sartorio was a pupil of Mariano Fortuny. He was linked to the In Arte, Libertas movement founded by Nino Costa, of Pre-Raphaelite tendency. In his production stands out the representation of the fatal woman, in works such as Diana of Ephesus (1895–1899, National Gallery of Modern Art, Rome) and The Gorgon and the Heroes (1897, National Gallery of Modern Art, Rome).

Other lesser representatives of Italian Symbolism included Felice Casorati, Luigi Bonazza, Vittorio Zecchin, and Guido Cadorin.

Mention should also be made of a group of young painters who would later become prominent representatives of futurism, who at the beginning of their career went through a symbolist phase, such as Umberto Boccioni, Giacomo Balla and Luigi Russolo. Boccioni was trained in divisionism. In 1907 he met Previati in Milan, who passed on to him his interest in the psychology of the image; he was also influenced by the Sezession and Edvard Munch (The Mourning, 1910, private collection). Balla likewise started from divisionism, while he was later influenced by Segantini, Pellizza and Previati; he focused on social aspects, a reflection of his socialist and humanitarian ideals. Russolo was also trained in divisionism, but under the influence of Previati and Boccioni he developed a series of works focused on the urban environment and the industrial era interpreted in a symbolist key: Lightning, 1909–1910, National Gallery of Modern Art, Rome.

Ultimately it would be appropriate to recall the symbolist stage of Giorgio de Chirico, who would later be the main exponent of metaphysical painting. He studied at the Academy of Fine Arts, Munich, where he came into contact with the philosophy of Nietzsche and Schopenhauer, and the painting of Böcklin and Max Klinger. His works were inspired by the classical Greco-Roman world, with some semblance of scenography: The Wounded Centaur, 1909, private collection.

== Spain ==
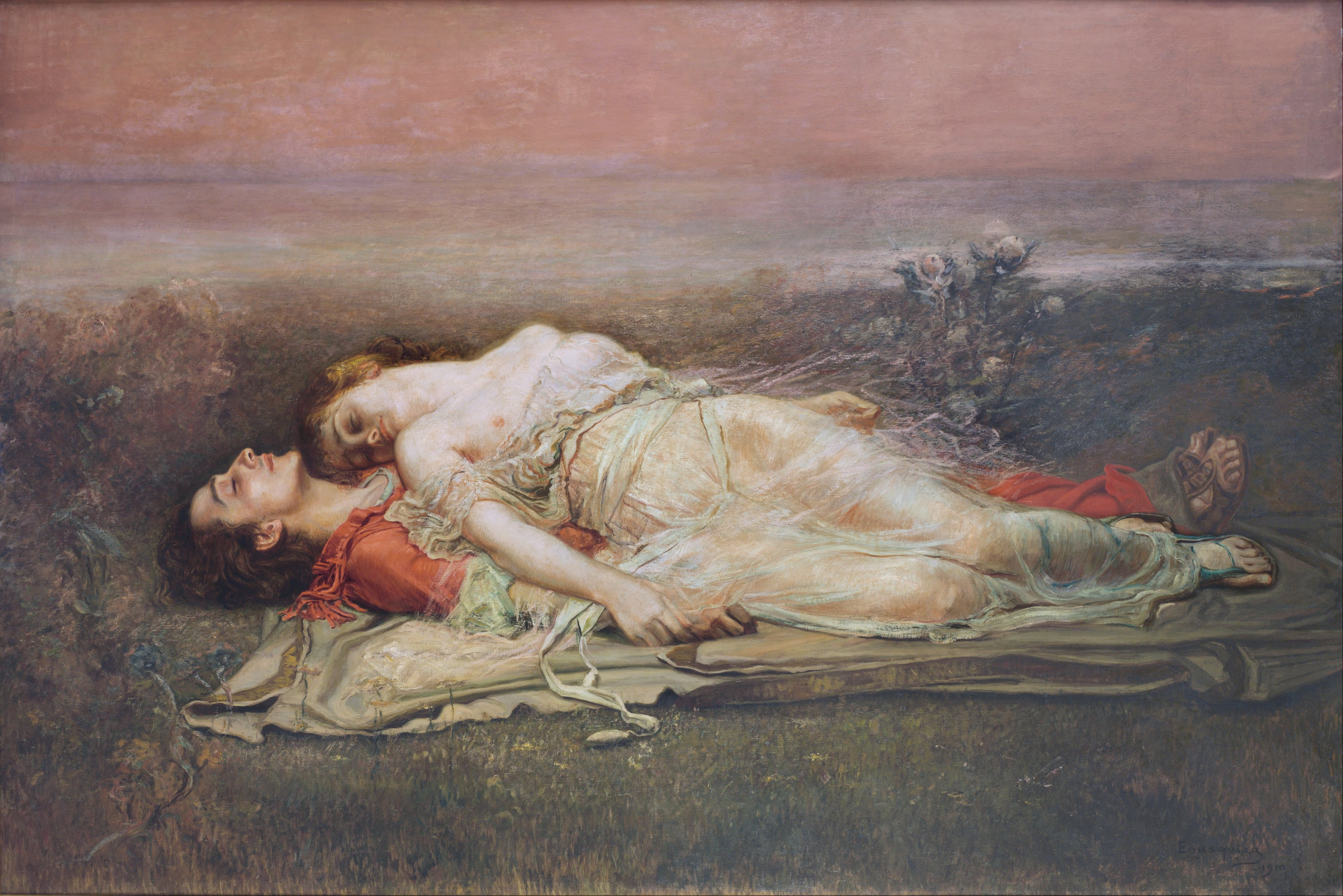
Tristan and Isolt (Death) (1910), by Rogelio de Egusquiza, Bilbao Fine Arts Museum

The art scene in fin-de-siècle Spain was monopolized by academic painting, which had as its platform the National Exhibition of Fine Arts, refractory to encouraging any artistic novelty, unlike the Parisian salons. Despite everything, some artists maintained contacts with European art—especially through France—so they were able to develop a more modern style, linked above all to Impressionism, as denoted in the work of Aureliano de Beruete and Agustín Riancho, or to the so-called Valencian Luminism, represented by Joaquín Sorolla. However, examples of Symbolist painting were rather scarce and circumscribed to the work of a few individual artists.

Darío de Regoyos lived for a time in Belgium and was a founding member of the group Les Vingt. He also frequented the impressionists in Paris and the Barcelona modernist circle of Els Quatre Gats—in 1910 he settled permanently in Barcelona. His style was rather close to impressionism—short brushstroke, clear palette—but some of his themes are close to symbolism because of his interest in marginal themes, as is denoted in his series of illustrations La España Negra, coming from a trip to the peninsula in 1888 with the Belgian poet Émile Verhaeren, in which he developed a series of images of bitter and, sometimes, somewhat gloomy tone of the Spain of the moment.

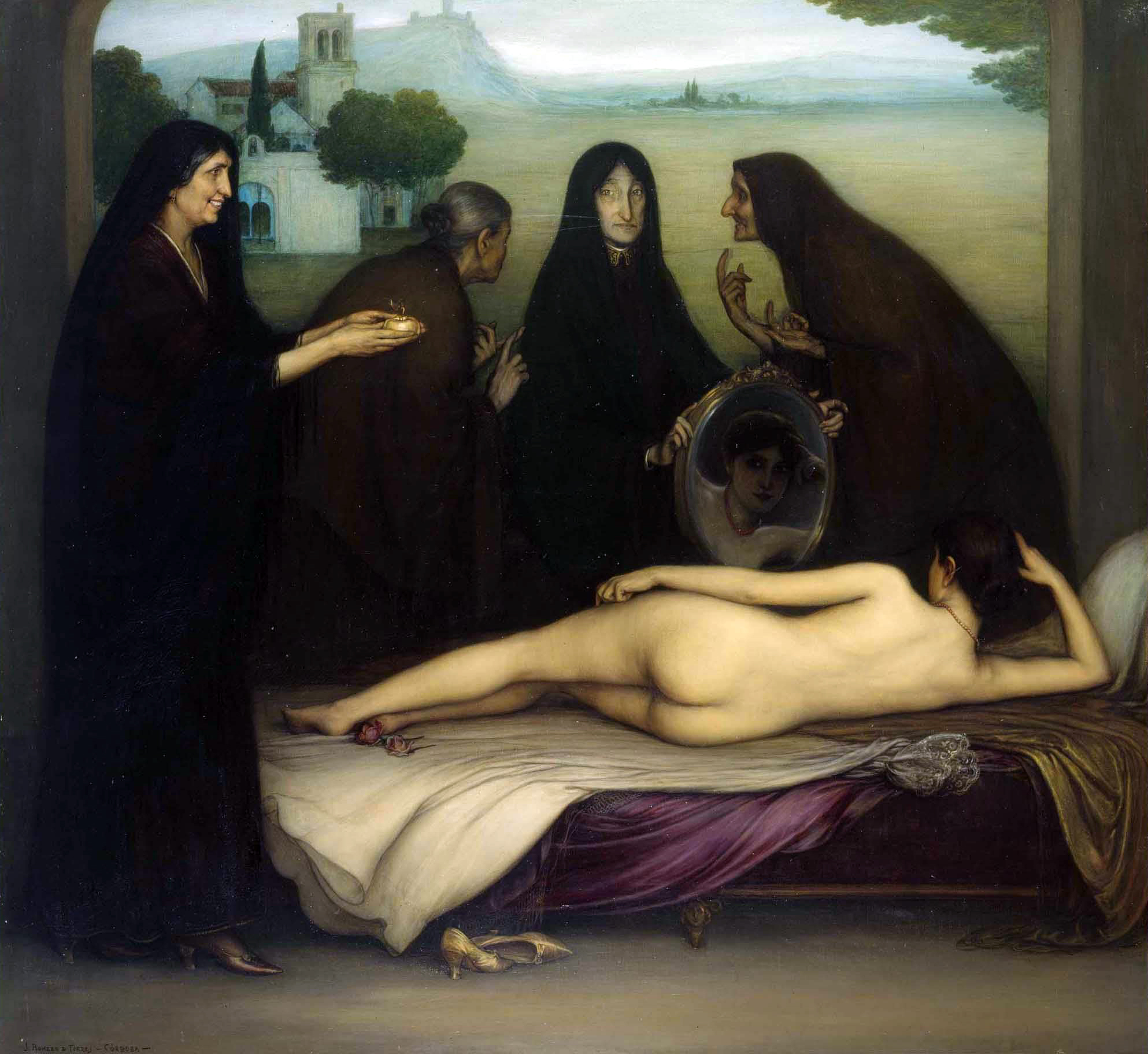
The Sin (1913), by Julio Romero de Torres, Museo Julio Romero de Torres, Córdoba

Ignacio Zuloaga was also an interpreter of that vision of an atavistic and tremendist Spain, which he captured in his trips to Las Hurdes or the sierra de Gredos with Doctor Gregorio Marañón. He lived for a time in France and Italy, and was an admirer of Goya and el Greco. His work is notable for a stark realism, gray and somber palette, with subject matter centered on popular Spanish scenes.

Rogelio de Egusquiza was a singular painter who evolved from academicism and a brief phase of fortunyista influence to a decorativist and exuberant symbolism strongly influenced by the work of Wagner, many of whose plots and characters he recreated in his paintings.

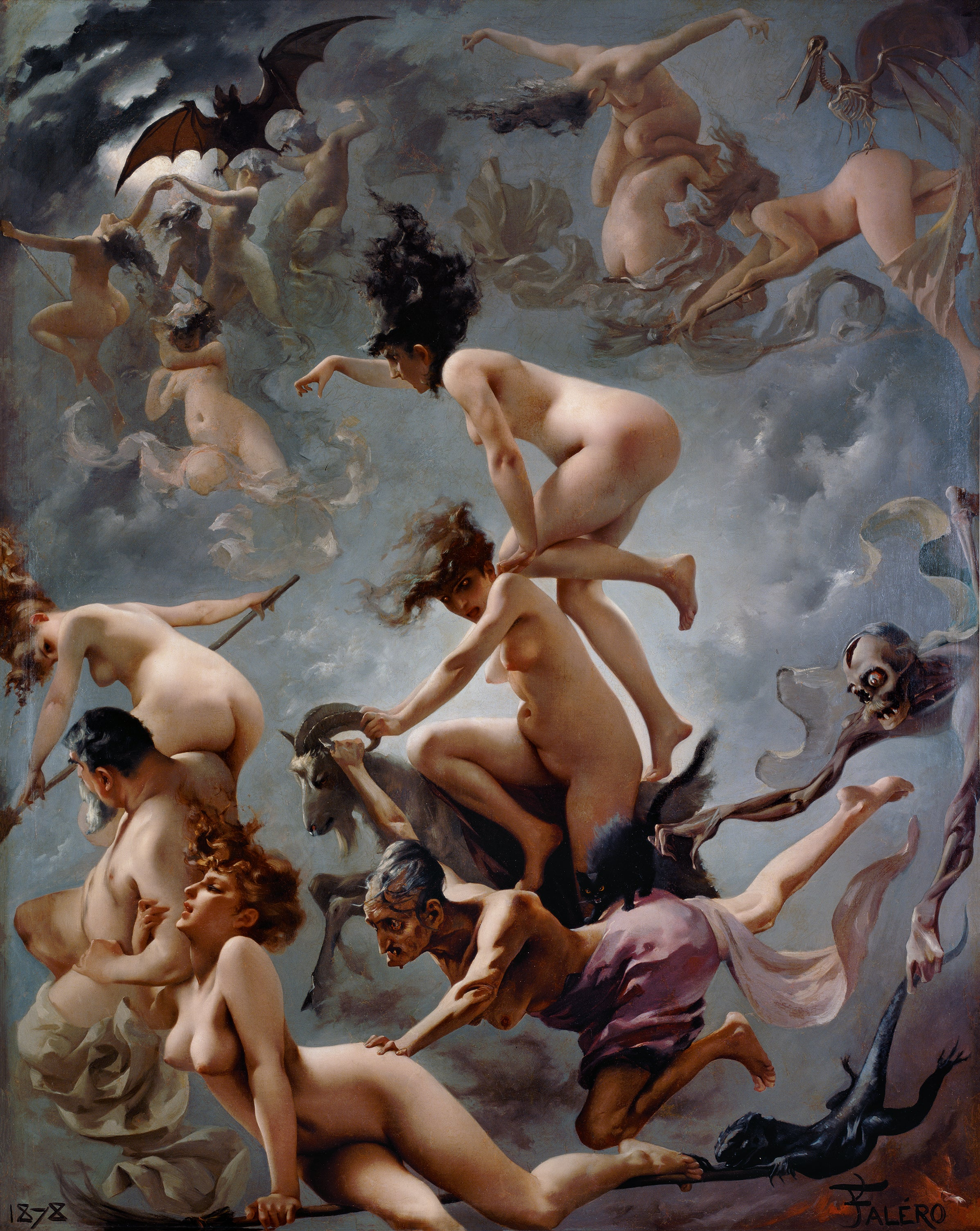
Witches on the Sabbath (1878), by Luis Ricardo Falero

Julio Romero de Torres developed a realistic style with a certain archaizing tendency in which, starting from typical genre scenes, he gives these themes a greater allegorical transcendence that moves them away from the tedious picturesqueness of Spanish 19th century painting to turn them into scenes of almost mystical evocation. In his work the presence of the Andalusian woman stands out, in representations that agglutinate mysticism and eroticism, wrapped in a mysterious halo, generally in desolate landscapes that are lost in the infinity that precede some of the surrealist landscapes.

Close to Romero's style is Miquel Viladrich, a Catalan trained in Madrid and Paris who triumphed especially in United States, Argentina and Morocco. He practiced like Romero an archaizing realism but with a more naïve aspect, more popular roots and a more gloomy tone.

Eduardo Chicharro combined modernist arabesque with symbolist idealism, as in his triptych Los amores de Armida y Reinaldo (1904, Museo de Jaén), which denotes Pre-Raphaelite influence. He also produced costumbrist works close to the style of Zuloaga.

Luis Ricardo Falero, with a rather academicist technique, dealt especially with the female nude—generally fairies and nymphs—sometimes with a touch of orientalist, as well as magical, astronomical and witchcraft themes. He lived much of his life in London, so he is not well known in Spain, a country in which no work of his is preserved.

Lastly, it is worth mentioning Néstor Martín-Fernández de la Torre, better known simply as Néstor, a painter somewhere between modernism and symbolism. Between 1904 and 1907, he traveled through France, Belgium and the United Kingdom, where he was influenced by Whistler and the Pre-Raphaelites. His specialty was fantastic paintings in aquatic environments, with scenes of sea monsters fighting with young naked ephebs, as an allegory of elemental forces that can only be overcome with effort. His compositions were bombastic, overloaded, dynamic and intensely colorful, sometimes approaching kitsch. A good example is La noche, "poema del Atlántico" (1917–1918, Museo Néstor, Las Palmas de Gran Canaria). After his death his work fell into oblivion, but his figure was recovered by Salvador Dalí.

=== Catalan modernism ===
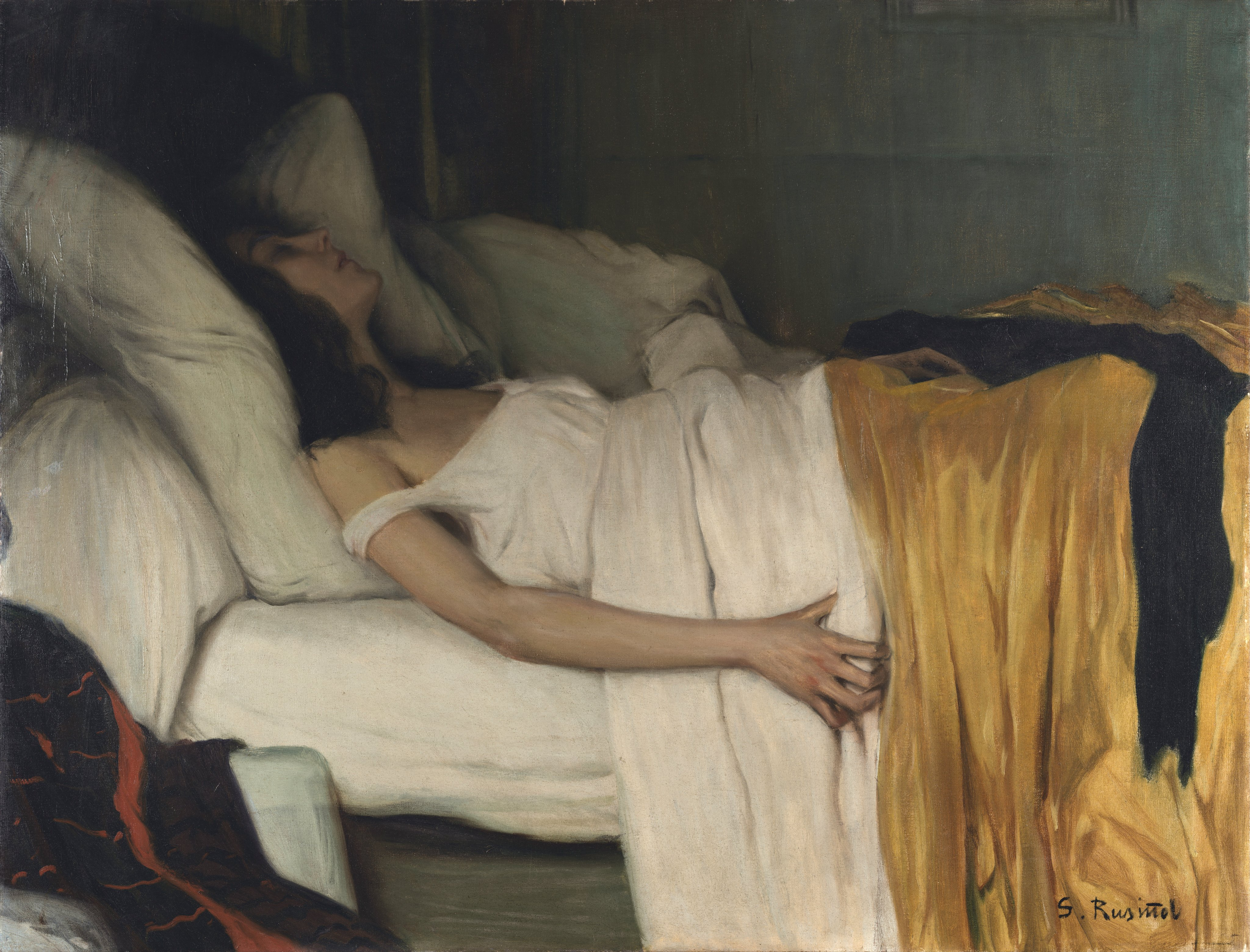
The Morphine's Girl (1894), by Santiago Rusiñol, Cau Ferrat Museum, Sitges

In Catalonia developed between the late 19th and early 20th centuries the Catalan modernism, a style linked to international art nouveau modernism but which here had its own characteristics linked to the rebirth of Catalan culture (Renaixença). It stood out especially in architecture, with renowned figures such as Antoni Gaudí, Lluís Domènech i Montaner and Josep Puig i Cadafalch, but also in painting and sculpture. It was a heterogeneous movement, which brought together various stylistic trends: according to a classification by Joan Ainaud de Lasarte (Modernism in Spain, 1969), Catalan modernism could be divided into symbolist, impressionist and post-impressionist modernism. The first would be the closest to international symbolism, with influences coming from Romanticism and Pre-Raphaelitism, although also from naturalism and other styles, which provided a great amalgam and complexity that was translated in different ways in each artist. In his production is perceived an idealism that gives great relevance to the iconography and that translates into the expression in the characters of ideas or feelings, with special predilection for the female figure. His main characteristics were asymmetry, two-dimensionality, sinuous lines, a taste for floral decoration, a certain medievalizing tendency and, especially with regard to symbolism, a predilection for allegory and symbolic subject matter.

One of the leading representatives of this movement was Santiago Rusiñol, established in 1890 in Paris together with Ramón Casas, where they entered the impressionist movement, with a special influence of Manet and Degas, that is, of impressionism with a more traditional base, of long and diffuse brushstrokes as opposed to the short and loose of the most avant-garde impressionism. However, around 1893–1894 Rusiñol evolved towards a more fully symbolist style: he abandoned realism and steered his work towards a more mythical and aestheticizing, almost evasionist tone, as denoted in his decorative plafonds for the Cau Ferrat of Sitges in 1896 (La Pintura, La Poesía, La Música). With the beginning of the 20th century he moved more towards landscape painting, still with a certain symbolist stamp but with a greater tendency towards realism.

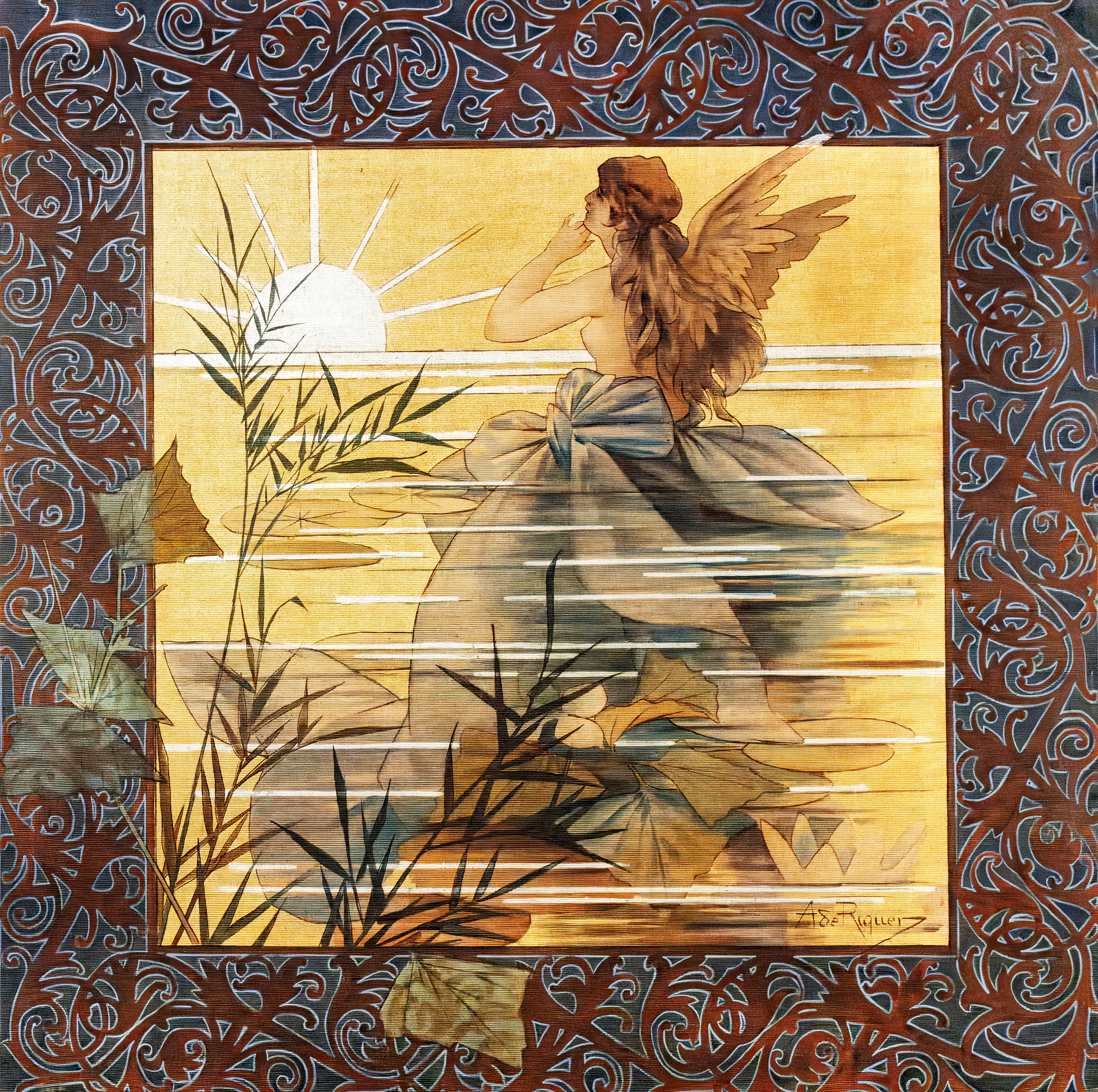
Composition with winged nymph at sunrise (1887), by Alexandre de Riquer, National Art Museum of Catalonia, Barcelona

Alexandre de Riquer was a painter, engraver, decorator, illustrator and poster artist, as well as a poet and art theorist. He lived for a time in London, where he was influenced by Pre-Raphaelitism and the Arts & Crafts movement. He excelled especially in book illustration (Crisantemes, 1899; Anyoranses, 1902) and in the design of ex-libris, a genre he raised to heights of great quality.

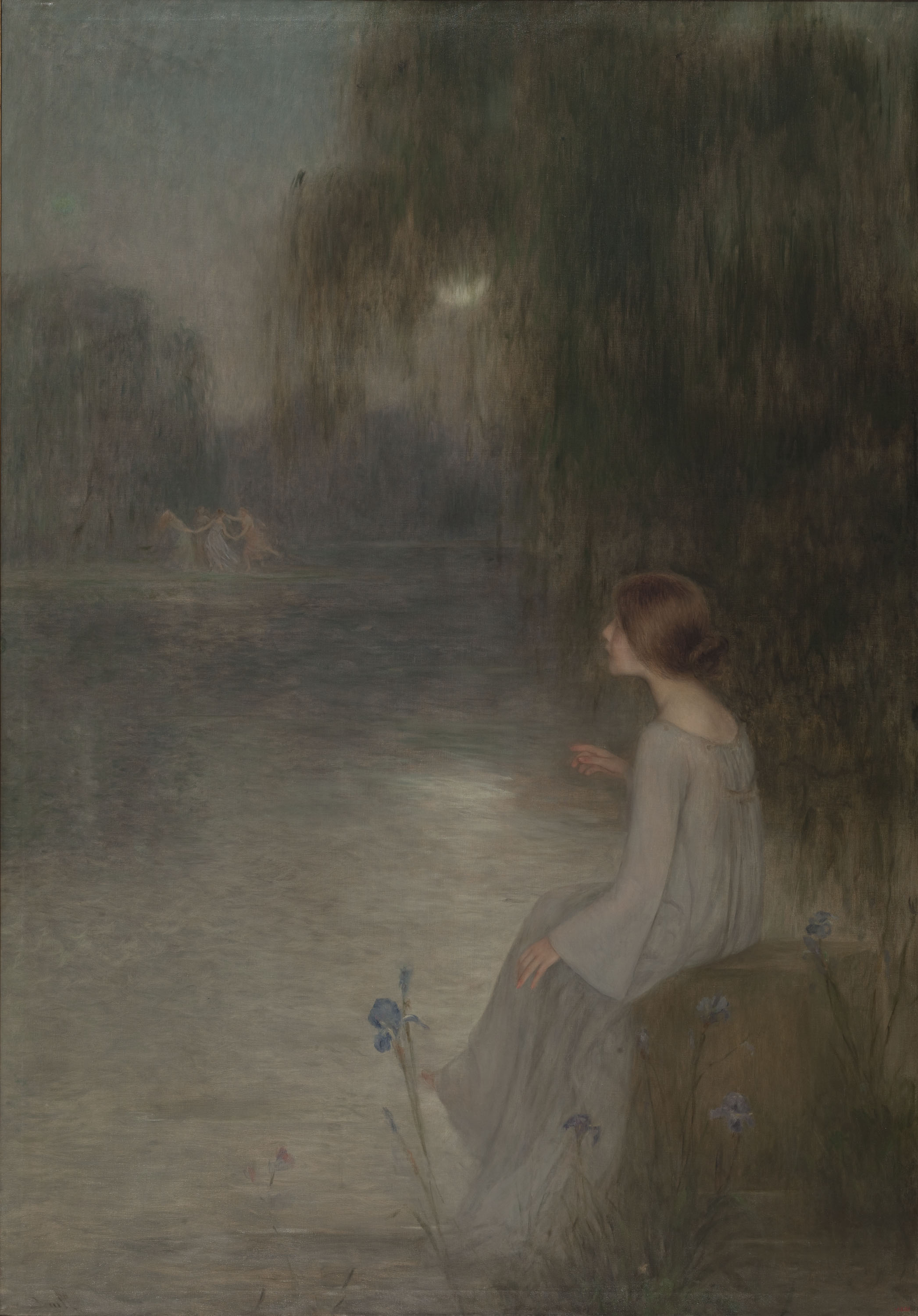
Ensueño (1897) by Joan Brull, National Museum of Art of Catalonia, Barcelona

Joan Llimona, founder of the Cercle Artístic de Sant Lluc, leaned towards a mysticism of strong religiosity, as denoted in his paintings for the dome of the camarín of the church of the Monastery of Montserrat (1898) or the murals of the dining room of the Recolons house in Barcelona (1905). Trained at the Escola de la Llotja, he furthered his studies in Italy for four years. His first works were of genre costumbrista, but by 1890 his painting focused on religion, with compositions that combine formal realism with the idealism of the subjects, with a style sometimes compared to Millet and Puvis de Chavannes.

Joan Brull studied in Barcelona with Simó Gómez and in Paris with Raphaël Collin. His most symbolist stage was centered between 1898 and 1900. In his work the representation of the female figure stands out, with girls of ethereal beauty who often take the form of fairies or nymphs, as in Calypso (1896, National Art Museum of Catalonia, Barcelona) or Ensueño (1897, National Art Museum of Catalonia, Barcelona).

Josep Maria Tamburini developed a similar aesthetic of idealized female figures, as in Harmonies of the Forest (1896, National Art Museum of Catalonia, Barcelona). Initiated in academicism, in which he showed great technical perfection, he was later one of the modernist painters most akin to symbolism, especially for his subject matter of romantic content.

Sebastià Junyent was a restless artist, initiated in Parisian impressionism at the same time as Casas and Rusiñol but who was developing a personal work in which his most symbolist phase is found between 1899, year of his Clorosis of Whistlerian influence, and 1903, date in which he made an Annunciation that already indicated a more archaizing style. His best work in these years was Ave María (1902, Junyent collection, Barcelona), which shows an idealism close to Henri Martin. He may have influenced Pablo Picasso, with whom he shared a studio in Barcelona and whom he accompanied to Paris.

Among the younger ones were Adrià Gual and Lluís Masriera. Gual was, in addition to painter, playwright, set designer, theater director and film pioneer. Initiated in realism, he made a radical turn towards a modernism of symbolist tendency in 1896 with his illustrated book Nocturno. Andante moderado. His best work is El rocío (1897, Museo Nacional de Arte de Cataluña, Barcelona). Masriera stood out more as a goldsmith than as a painter, but he also developed a work of notable symbolist content of refined and decorative tone.

Other artists within this current were Aleix Clapés, Lluís Graner, Laureà Barrau, Joaquim Vancells, Ramon Pichot and Josep Maria Xiró Xiró.

=== Picasso ===
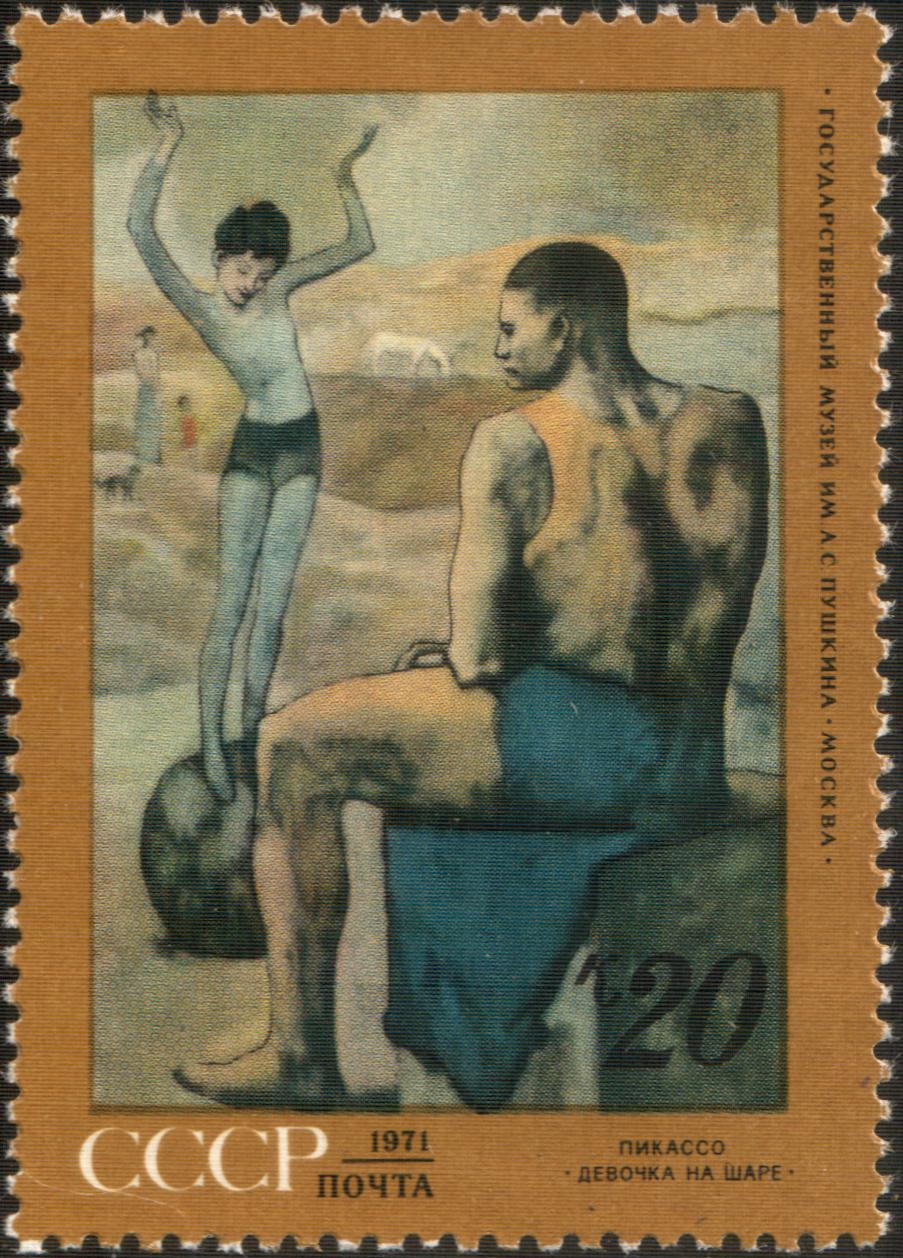
Soviet postage stamp from 1971, commemorating Pablo Picasso's work entitled Acrobat on a ball, made during the painter's rose period. The original painting is at the Pushkin Museum, Moscow

Finally, it is worth mentioning the symbolist period of Pablo Picasso. After an academic training and a first contact with modern art during his stay in Barcelona, where he joined the modernist circle, between 1901 and 1907 he opted for a style close to symbolism, which resulted in the blue (1901–1904) and rose (1904–1907) periods of the Malaga-born artist.

In the artistic-literary environment of the Barcelona brewery Els Quatre Gats, Picasso came into contact with impressionism, the Nabis, the English symbolists (Burne-Jones, Whistler, Beardsley), the philosophy of Nietzsche and Schopenhauer, the literature of Ibsen, Strindberg and Maeterlinck, and the music of Wagner. All these influences contributed to a period of sadness and melancholy in the artist's mood—increased by the suicide of his friend Carles Casagemas in 1901—which resulted in his blue period. By then he had made his first trip to Paris in 1900, where he was influenced by Toulouse-Lautrec, Carrière, Daumier and Théophile Steinlen. The influence of Isidre Nonell is also noticeable at this stage, especially in the modeling and simplified contours. His works from this period focus on poverty and solitude, as well as motherhood and old age (Life, 1903, Cleveland Museum of Art; Forsaken, 1903, Museu Picasso, Barcelona). His main stylistic feature is the predominance of the color blue, probably influenced by Whistler's Nocturnes, the greenish blue tones of Burne-Jones's late works and the painting The Vigil of Saint Geneviève by Puvis de Chavannes, of an almost monochromatic blue, as well as the symbolic association of this color with spirituality and—in the work of Verlaine and Mallarmé—with decadence. In 1904, already settled in Paris, the influence of Spanish mannerist and baroque artists such as el Greco, Velázquez and Zurbarán is perceptible.

In the rose period he moved from sadness to joy, with more jovial subjects centering on circus figures, acrobats, dancers and acrobats (The Ball Acrobat, 1905, Pushkin Museum, Moscow; Sitting Acrobats with Boy, 1906, Kunsthaus Zürich). This was also reflected in his palette, centered on pastel tones, with a preference for pink, as well as gray. Settled in Paris, he met relevant figures of art and culture, such as Sergey Shchukin, Daniel Henry Kahnweiler, Leo and Gertrude Stein, Henri Matisse and Guillaume Apollinaire. The greater success in his career and his relationship with Fernande Olivier led him to a greater optimism, which translated into kinder subjects and softer coloring, with images plagued by tenderness and a certain nostalgia. Even so, at times the dramatism of the previous stage is glimpsed, with sad and melancholic characters and scenes with a certain mystery, as in La familia de saltimbanquis (1905, National Gallery of Art, Washington D.C.).

== Eastern Europe ==
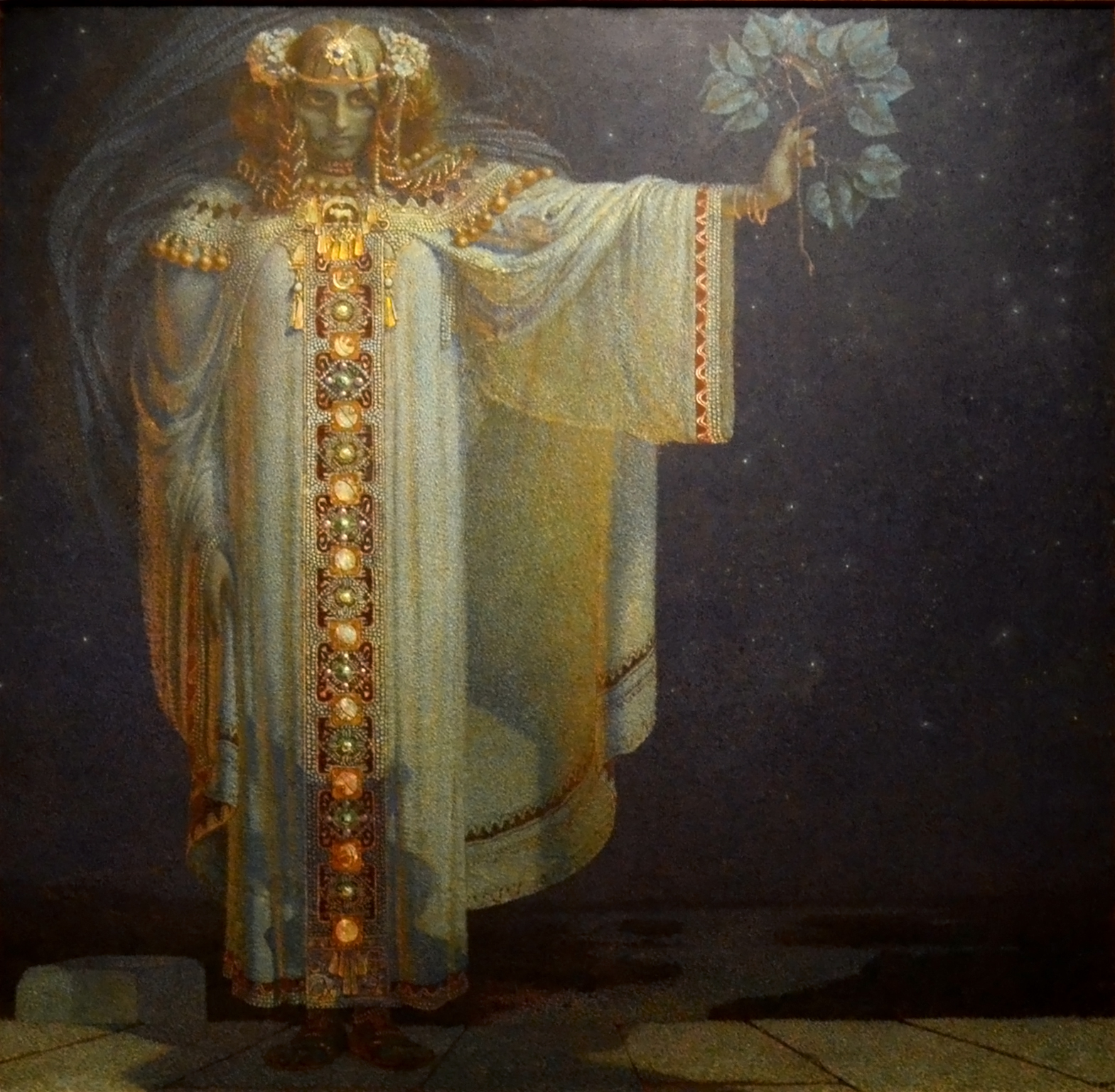
Libuše (1893), de Karel Vítězslav Mašek, Museo de Orsay, París

One of the countries where Symbolism was most developed was Bohemia (present day Czech Republic), belonging until 1918 to the Austro-Hungarian Empire and therefore immersed in the Western artistic sphere, especially the Germanic one. One of its best exponents was František Kupka, a disciple of the Nazarene painter František Sequens, who to pay for his classes worked as a spiritualist medium. In 1895 he traveled to Paris, where he was influenced by Ensor and Toulouse-Lautrec. Interested in occultism, he produced works of a decorative, fantastic and dramatic mysticism: Woman and Money (1899, Národní Galerie, Prague), Ballad of Epona (The Joys) (1900, Národní Galerie, Prague), The Beginning of Life (1900–1903, Centre Georges Pompidou, Paris). From the 1910s his work moved towards abstraction.

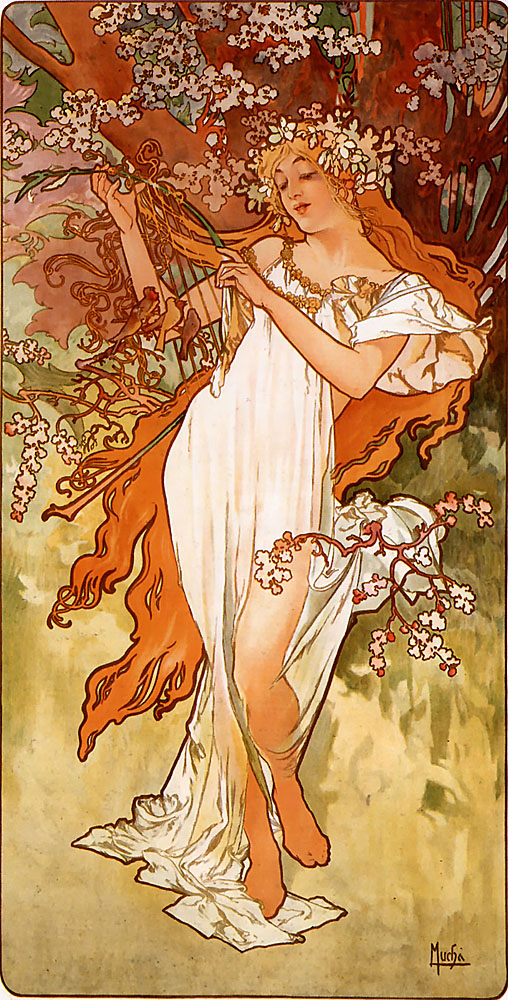
Spring (1896), by Alfons Mucha, private collection

Alfons Mucha was an artist halfway between modernism and symbolism. He lived and worked in Vienna and Munich before settling in Paris in 1887, where he studied at the Académie Julian. He then lived for several years in the United States (1904–1911), until he returned to his homeland, where he devoted himself to monumental format. He was a painter, engraver, draftsman, poster artist, photographer and jewelry designer. He worked as an illustrator for the newspaper La plume and reaped great success in the making of theatrical posters, especially those made for Sarah Bernhardt. His compositions were often based on photography, with a light and elegant style in which the female image stands out, endowed with a supernatural beauty, as well as a taste for arabesque and floral decoration.

Jan Preisler generally depicted spiritual themes, moods turned into something tangible, in which the artist himself stated his intentions in the work. He has here an element in common with Edvard Munch, an artist whom Preisler admired. He was influenced by Hans von Marées, Maurice Denis and Puvis de Chavannes. His work shows a concern for the human being in all facets of life, from the sentimental to the fantasy of tales and myths, and points in good measure toward Expressionism.

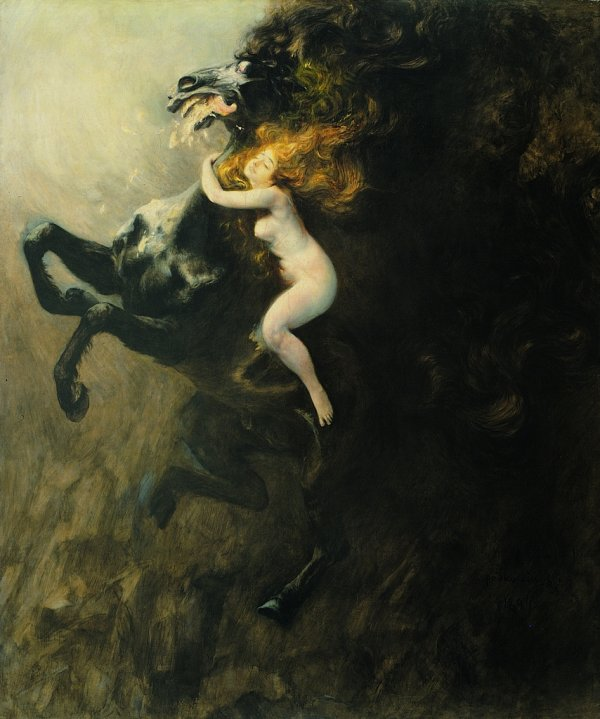
Frenzy of Exultations (1893), by Władysław Podkowiński, National Museum of Kraków

Karel Vítězslav Mašek was a painter and architect. During a stay in Paris, where he was a student of Alphonse Osbert and Henri Martin, he adopted the pointillism of Seurat, to later opt for symbolism. His work shows a strong decorativism, not for nothing was he a professor at the School of Decorative Arts in Prague. He sometimes used luminescent colored mosaics, like Klimt.

Other representatives of Czech symbolism include Jakub Schikaneder, Max Švabinský, Antonín Slavíček and Ludvík Kuba.

Poland was going through a difficult time at this time, with its territory divided into three parts between Russia, Prussia and the Austro-Hungarian Empire, and its language and culture outlawed in the Russian and Prussian spheres; on the Austrian side—centered in Kraków—less repressive, it was on the Austrian side that Polish culture developed the most. In relation to symbolism, an essential factor was the work of the writer Stanisław Przybyszewski, poet and art theorist, a provocative character supporter of Satanism, who spread symbolism in his country. Together with Stanisław Wyspiański he founded the magazine Życie (Life), which was the organ of an artistic association called Młoda Polska (Young Poland), which promoted symbolism of a decadentist tone, as well as neo-romanticism, impressionism and modernism.

Wyspiański was a painter, poet and playwright. A pupil of the academicist Jan Matejko, he also studied literature and art history. He furthered his studies at the Parisian Académie Colarossi, between 1890 and 1894. On his return to his country he introduced secessionist decorativism into the art scene, which helped its renewal. He excelled as a portraitist and illustrator, and also designed stained glass windows, such as those in the Franciscan church in Kraków.

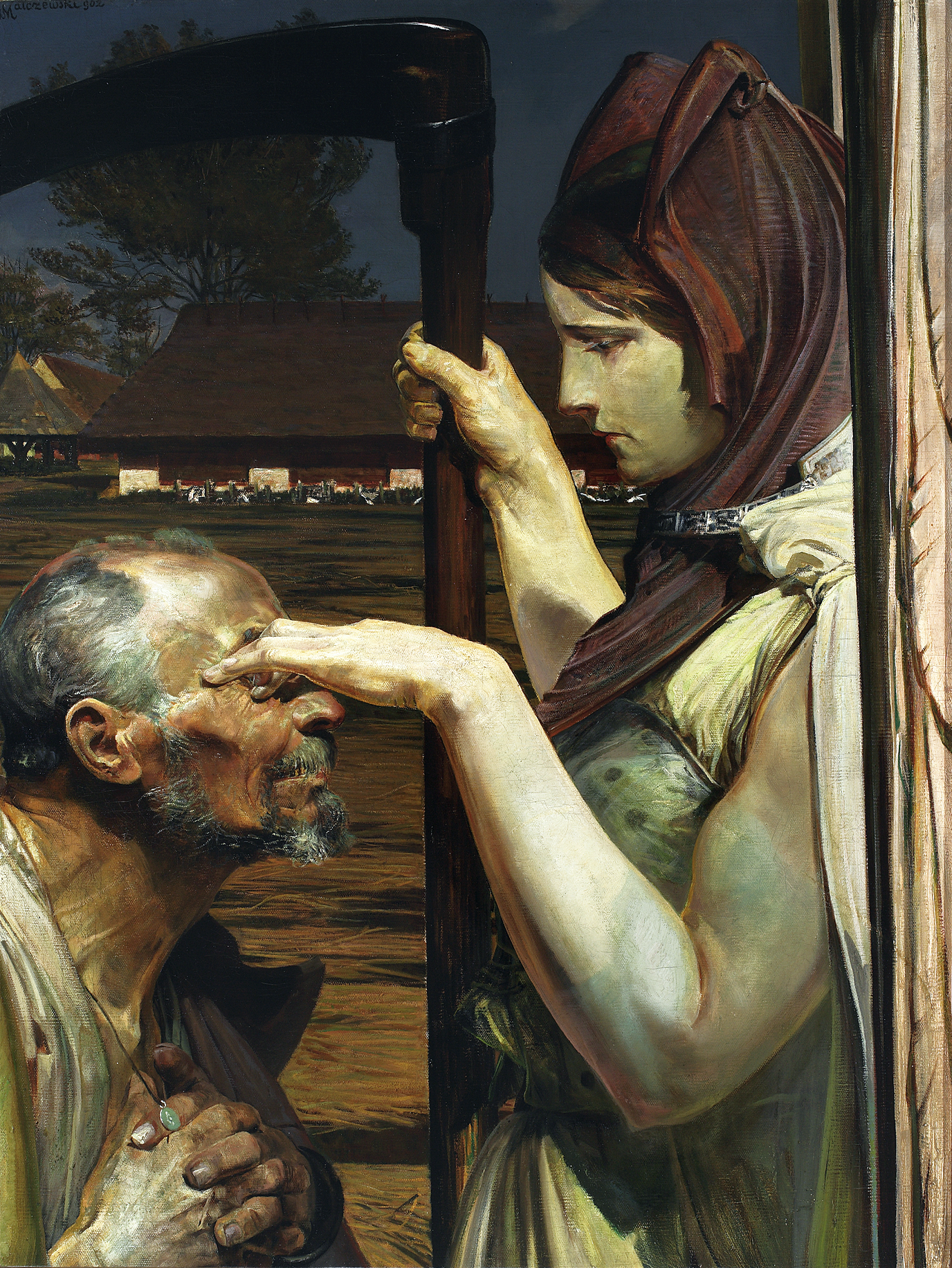
Death (1902), by Jacek Malczewski, National Museum of Warsaw

Like the previous one, Józef Mehoffer was a pupil of Jan Matejko and studied at the Académie Colarossi in Paris, where he befriended Gauguin and Mucha. He produced illustrations for the magazines Życie and Chimera. He also designed stained-glass windows, such as those in the church of St. Nicholas in Fribourg.

Jacek Malczewski was also a pupil of Jan Matejko, from whom he took a taste for historical as well as mythological and religious subjects. He painted numerous self-portraits in various costumes, sometimes in interplay with a beautiful woman representing death. Concerned about the situation in his country, in his Polish Hamlet (1903, National Museum in Warsaw) he painted two women, one with her hands bound and the other breaking her chains, representing the old and the new Poland.

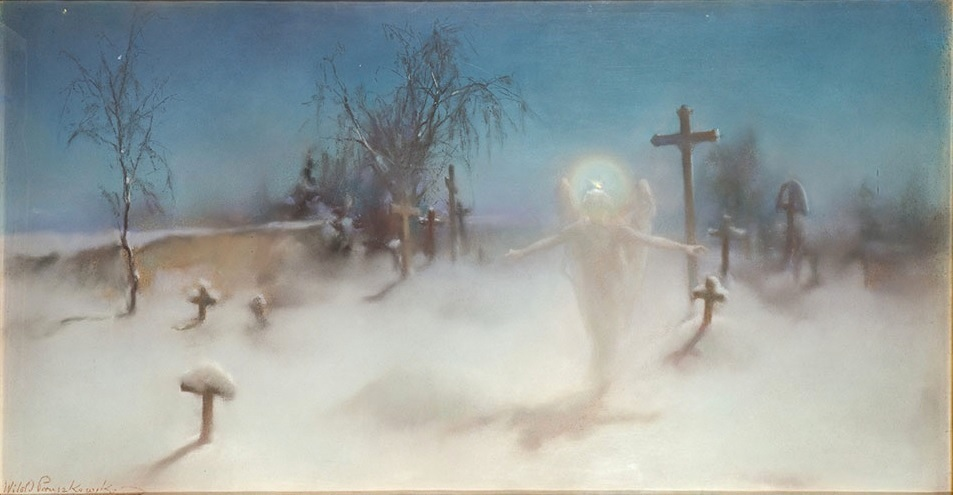
Eloé (1892), de Witold Pruszkowski, National Museum, Wrocław

Józef Pankiewicz began in Impressionism and also had contacts with Viennese Secessionism, but was later influenced by Symbolism, with a preference for the genre of the nocturne (Swans in the Saxon Garden, 1896, Kraków Museum). He was a member of the Sztuka (Art) society, founded in Kraków in 1897 with the aim of promoting art contrary to academicism and encouraging the exhibition circuit in Poland. Members of this group displayed artistic tendencies ranging from Impressionism and symbolism to Expressionism.

Witold Wojtkiewicz focused on the world of childhood and the circus, with a style combining the lyrical and the grotesque and approaching expressionism and surrealism. He died at the age of thirty.

Other exponents of Polish symbolism were Bruno Schulz, Władysław Ślewiński, Wojciech Weiss, Władysław Podkowiński and Witold Pruszkowski.

In Hungary, József Rippl-Rónai stood out. A disciple of the academicist Mihály Munkácsy, he moved to Paris and came into contact with the symbolist environment of that city; he also visited the artistic colony of Pont-Aven, frequented the Nabis and befriended Whistler and Carrière. In 1897 the art dealer Samuel Bing organized an exhibition of his work with 130 of his paintings. In 1902 he returned to his native country. His work shows a certain monumentality and a solemn air, with a tendency to monochrome and to synthesize form and color, and a clear and friendly palette.

János Vaszary was influenced by Puvis de Chavannes, which is denoted in his taste for mural painting, especially in landscapes of stylized composition with fine black line contours, with naturalistic figures of correct anatomical drawing. Another representative was Aladár Körösfői-Kriesch, similar in style to the previous one in his contrast of flat forms and anatomically well-defined figures, with a certain influence of Gustav Klimt and the Nazarene Melchior Lechter. His work denotes a certain classicism, with a cold chromaticism that contrasts with his taste for golden color.

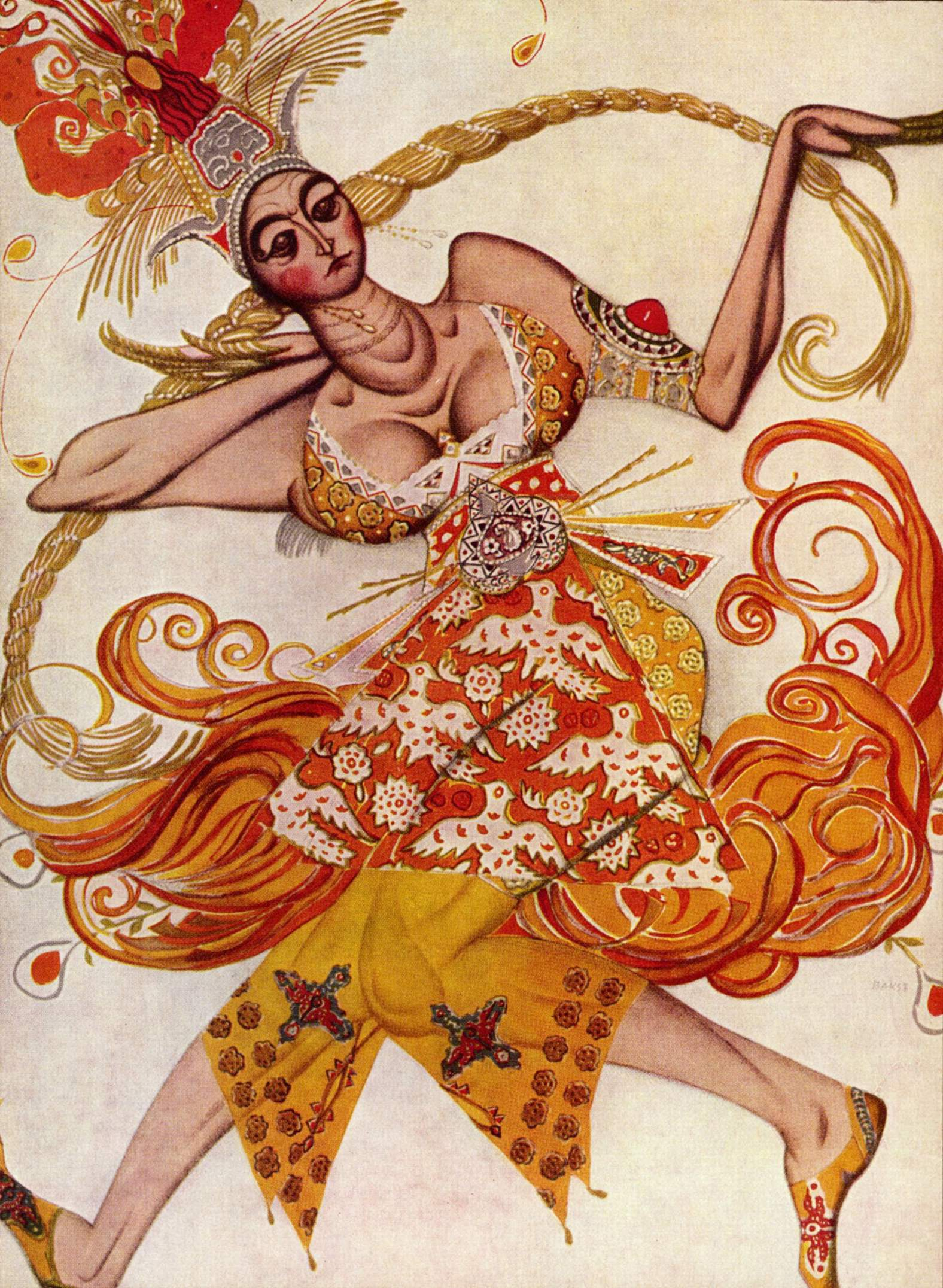
Dancer design for The Firebird (1910), by Lev Bakst

In Russia, symbolism developed in extensive interrelation with the literature of Tolstoy and Dostoyevsky and the music of Rimski-Korsakov. In 1898, Alexandre Benois and Sergey Diaghilev founded the Mir Iskusstva (Art World) group in Saint Petersburg, with the aim of renewing the Russian art scene and breaking away from academicism. Among their influences, in addition to modernism and symbolism, were folk and medieval art, as well as children's drawing and primitive art, from which they drew their preference for formal simplification and bright colors, two of their main hallmarks. Like the Nabis, they aimed to achieve a synthesis of the arts, so they were equally concerned with painting and sculpture as with ceramics or wood, and also ventured into the scenographic arts, as manifested in Diaghilev's Ballets Russes. In 1900 joined the group Lev Bakst, painter, set designer and costume designer, influenced by modernism and oriental art. The group edited a magazine of the same name, Mir Iskusstva, and organized exhibitions of Western artists. The first took place in St. Petersburg in 1899, with works by Degas, Monet, Moreau, Böcklin, Puvis de Chavannes and Whistler. The last one, in 1906, marked the debut of some avant-garde artists such as Mikhail Larionov, Natalia Goncharova and Alekséj von Jawlensky. That same year Diáguilev organized an exhibition of Russian art at the Salon d'Autumne in Paris. After the exhibition the group was dissolved. Between 1910 and 1924 its name was used as an exhibition company, but focused on avant-garde art.

The Ballets Russes was a ballet company created in 1909 by Diáguilev, composed mainly of dancers from the Imperial Ballet of the Mariinsky Theatre of Saint Petersburg, among whom Vaslav Nijinsky was prominent. She was successively based in Paris, Monte Carlo, Paris and London. In addition to music and ballet, it was especially noted for its scenery, sets and costumes, designed mainly by Benois and Bakst, as well as other artists such as Nikolai Roerich, Konstantin Korovin and Aleksandr Golovin. Alexandre Benois, of French descent, was a painter, scenographer, historian and art critic. In his stage designs he combined traditional Russian art with some elements of French rococo. Lev Bakst studied at the Parisian Académie Julian and was a pupil of Jean-Léon Gérôme. He combined Russian folk art with modern French art, with a coloristic style noted for its sense of rhythm. Among the company's major productions are: Polovtsian Dances from Prince Igor, with sets and costumes by Roerich (1909); The Feast, with sets by Korovin and costumes by Korovin, Bakst and Benois (1909); The Gardens of Armida, by Benois (1909); Cleopatra, by Bakst (1909); Les Sylphides, by Benois (1909); The Firebird, by Golovin (1910); Scheherezade, by Bakst (1910), Petrushka, by Benois (1911); The Spectre of the Rose, by Bakst (1911); Afternoon of a Faun, by Bakst (1912); and The Legend of Joseph (1914), by Bakst and Josep Maria Sert. From 1914 the ballets moved away from the symbolist style. The company was dissolved in 1929, after Diáguilev's death.

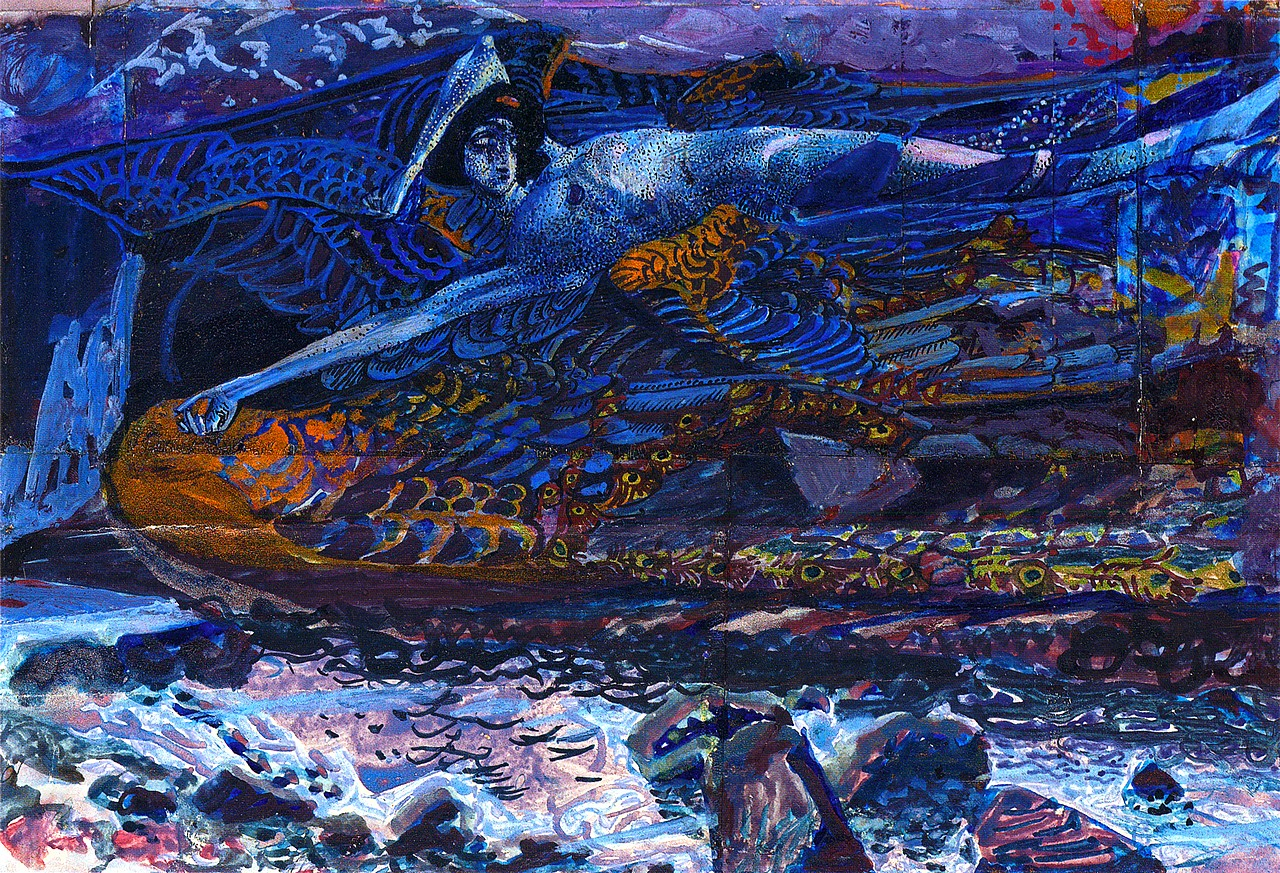
Fallen Demon (1901), by Mikhail Vrubel, Pushkin Museum, Moscow

Outside this group, the work of Mikhail Vrubel stands out. He studied law before taking up painting at the age of twenty-four, and spent five years restoring the frescoes in the church of St. Cyril in Kyiv, later settling in Moscow to begin his personal career. His favorite themes were portraits, ballet scenes and mythological and allegorical representations. For fifteen years he produced several works inspired by Lermontov's The Demon, in which a demon falls in love with a young woman and, to possess her, kills her fiancé; when the young woman is secluded in a convent he seduces her, but she dies and the demon is left alone. In Vrúbel's work the demon evolves from a being of superhuman beauty to a crushed and desperate being. At the age of thirty-six he began to have symptoms of dementia, at forty he lost his sight and died at forty-four. Dubbed the Russian Cézanne by Naum Gabo, his work influenced Malevich and Kandinski.

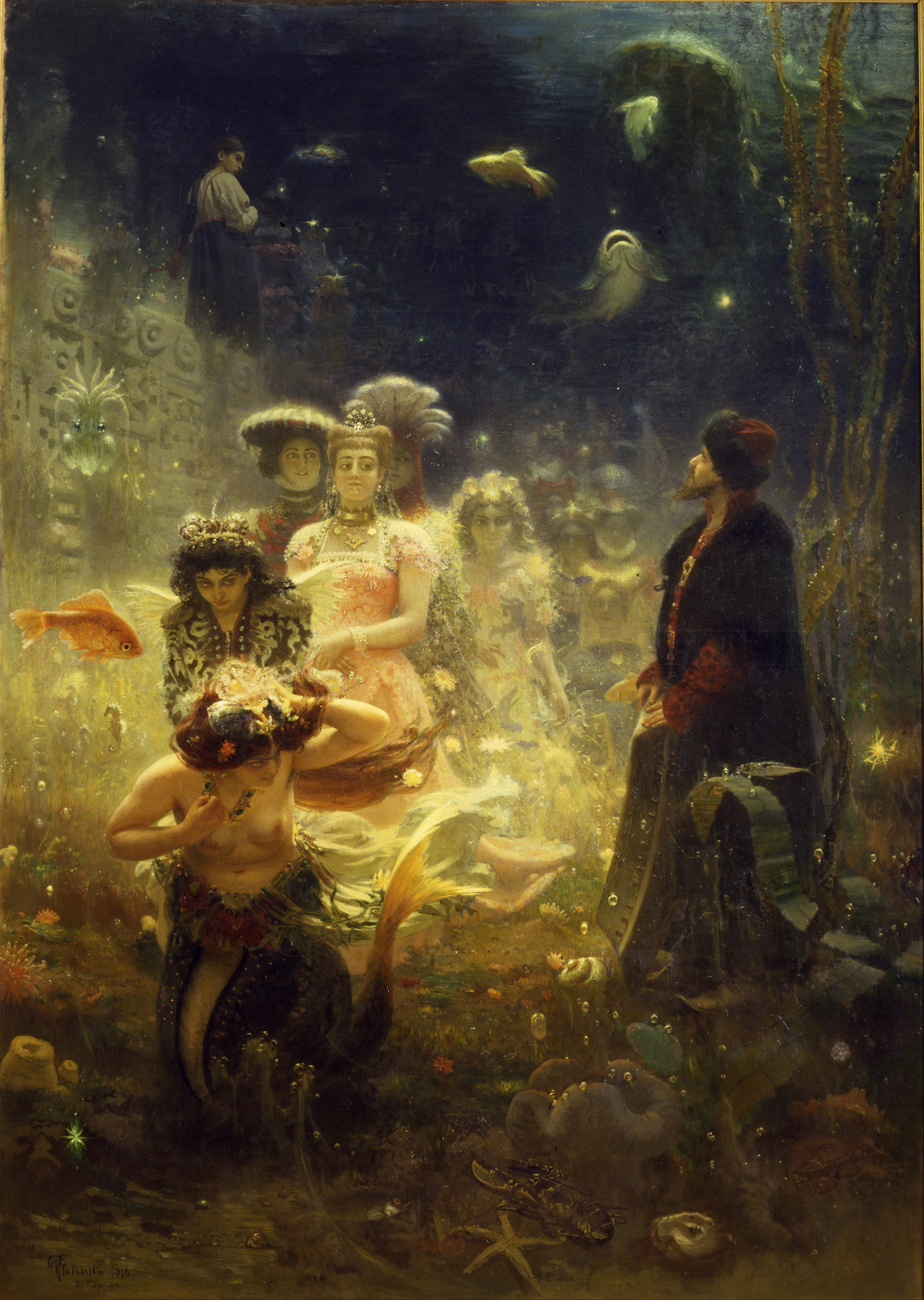
Sadko (1876), by Ilya Repin, State Russian Museum, St. Petersburg

Symbolism also influenced the mature work of Ilya Repin, a realist painter who was a member of the Peredvízhniki (Ambulants) group, with a melodramatic style of psychological introspection. In 1890 he joined the circle of Mir Iskusstva and went through a symbolist phase. He was a member of the magazine's editorial board and participated in several exhibitions organized by Diáguilev. However, he soon broke away from the group, which he considered dilettante, and continued with his realist style.

Kuzma Petrov-Vodkin studied in Moscow and Paris, and traveled in France, Italy, Greece and Africa. He was influenced by Puvis de Chavannes, Hodler and Denis. His work focuses on ideal concepts such as beauty, love and happiness. His style, often inspired by traditional Russian icons, is characterized by strong chromatic contrasts and the use of top-down perspectives. In his last stage he evolved towards realism.

Valentin Serov was a pupil of Repin and furthered his studies in Paris and Monaco. He was an outstanding portraitist who made images of Nicholas II, Maksim Gorky and Nikolai Rimski-Korsakov, among others. He was a member of Mir Iskusstva and a collaborator of Diáguilev. He evolved from a certain impressionism towards a symbolism influenced by traditional Russian art and classical Greek art.

Other exponents of Russian symbolism included Viktor Zamiraylo, Konstantin Somov, Viktor Borisov-Musatov and Viktor Vasnetsov.

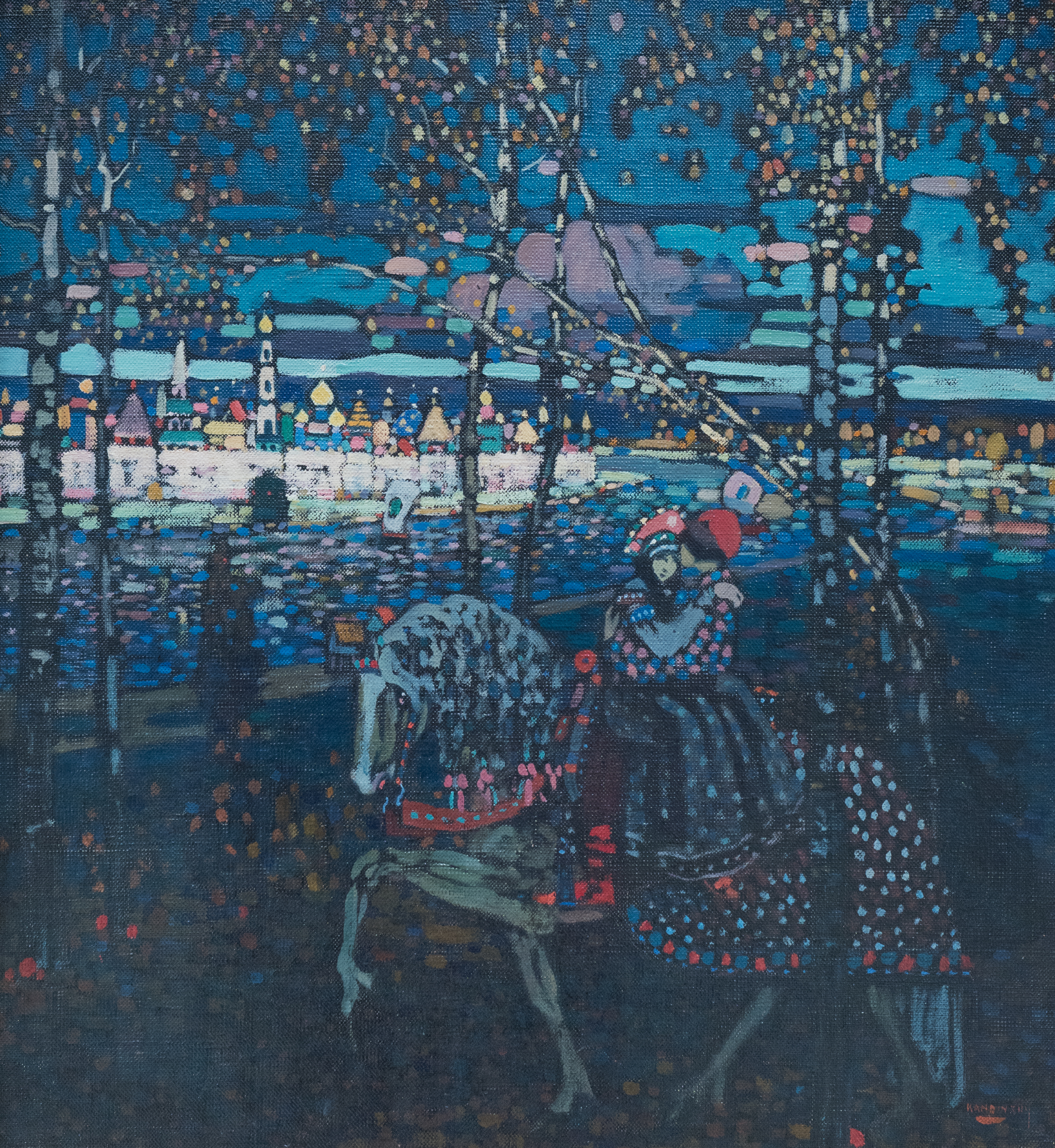
Couple Riding (1907), by Vasili Kandinsky

In Russia, it is also worth mentioning the symbolist phase of two young artists who would later stand out in avant-garde art: Vasili Kandinsky and Kasimir Malevich. Kandinski studied law, economics and politics before turning to art. In 1899 he settled in Munich, where he studied with Anton Ažbe and Franz von Stuck. Between 1903 and 1907 he traveled through Italy, France and Africa. Between 1907 and 1914 he lived between Berlin and Munich. After a few years back in Russia, in 1922 he returned to Germany and in 1933 he settled in France. The first phase of his work can be framed in symbolism, in which his source of inspiration were Slavic tales and legends, as well as elements of Orthodox religiosity and a certain tendency to occultism, perceptible for example in the symbolic transcription of his colors. In 1911 he joined the expressionist group Der Blaue Reiter and gradually moved towards abstraction, of which he was one of its pioneers.

Malevich, future founder of suprematism, had in his beginnings a symbolist phase, characterized by eroticism coupled with a certain mysticism of esoteric cut, with a style tending to monochrome, with a predominance of red and yellow: Woman picking flowers (1908, private collection), Oak and dryads (1908, private collection). He was a pupil of Borisov-Musatov, who in turn had been a pupil of Moreau. Influenced by Maurice Denis, his drawing had a certain tendency toward primitivism.

Last should be mentioned the Lithuanian Mikalojus Konstantinas Čiurlionis, painter and composer, an innovative artist with a tendency towards abstraction. Interested in Lithuanian mythology and the philosophy of Nietzsche and Rudolf Steiner, his style moved between symbolism and abstraction, in which a strong inspiration from music is denoted. Between 1906 and 1908 he produced a series of "musical abstractions" (Composition, Sea Sonata, Pyramidal Sonata) that sought to transcribe musical rhythms into the pictorial realm, in works of an abstracting tendency that sought to reflect in simplified lines the cosmic energies that he intended to capture with his work. He died poor at the age of thirty-six.

== United States ==
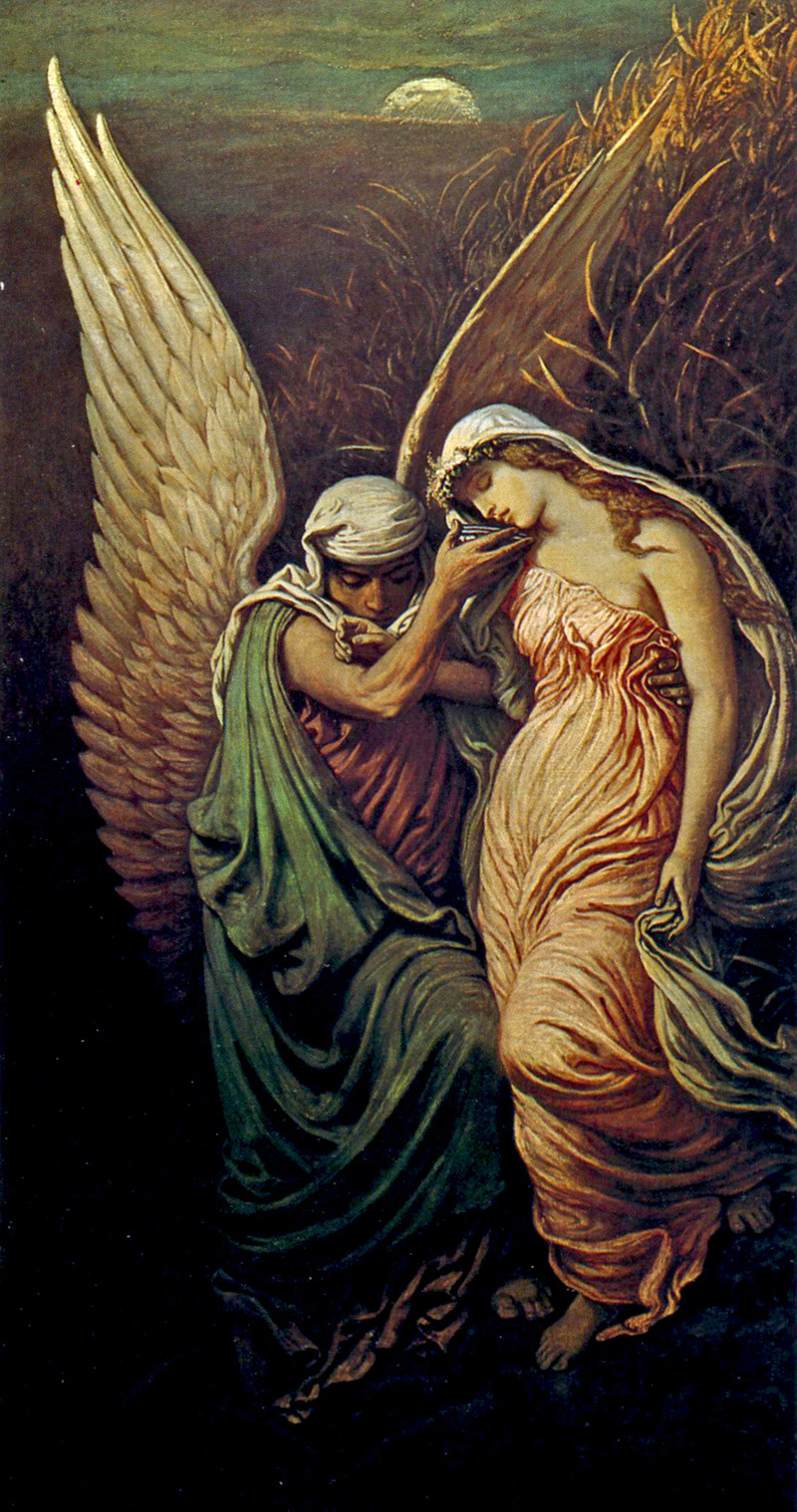
The Cup of Death (1885), by Elihu Vedder, Virginia Museum of Fine Arts, Richmond

In the United States, Symbolism had little implantation, but was practiced by a few artists who had known it on trips to Europe. As in the United Kingdom with Pre-Raphaelitism, in the United States the work developed by the Hudson River School and, especially, by Thomas Cole, a British-born painter and author of landscapes of allegorical and romantic tone, such as The Voyage of Life (1842, National Gallery of Art, Washington D. C.), a series of four canvases depicting the cycle of human life: childhood, youth, maturity, and old age, in the form of a traveler sailing a boat down a river (Life) guided by a guardian angel.

The American artistic scene was rather hostile to symbolism, since by its idiosyncrasy it was more inclined to realism: there still predominated the scientistic positivism and had a vivid idea of progress, especially in the economic field, since not in vain this country is along with the United Kingdom the cradle of capitalism. Thus, some aspects of European fin-de-siècle culture were viewed with suspicion, especially in terms of decadentism, which clashed head-on with the religious fundamentalism promoted by Protestantism. In this country, even art and poetry were considered feminine activities. Despite all this, there were various vestiges of Symbolist art, practiced by European-trained artists such as Albert Pinkham Ryder, Arthur Bowen Davies, Elihu Vedder, Maurice Prendergast and John White Alexander.

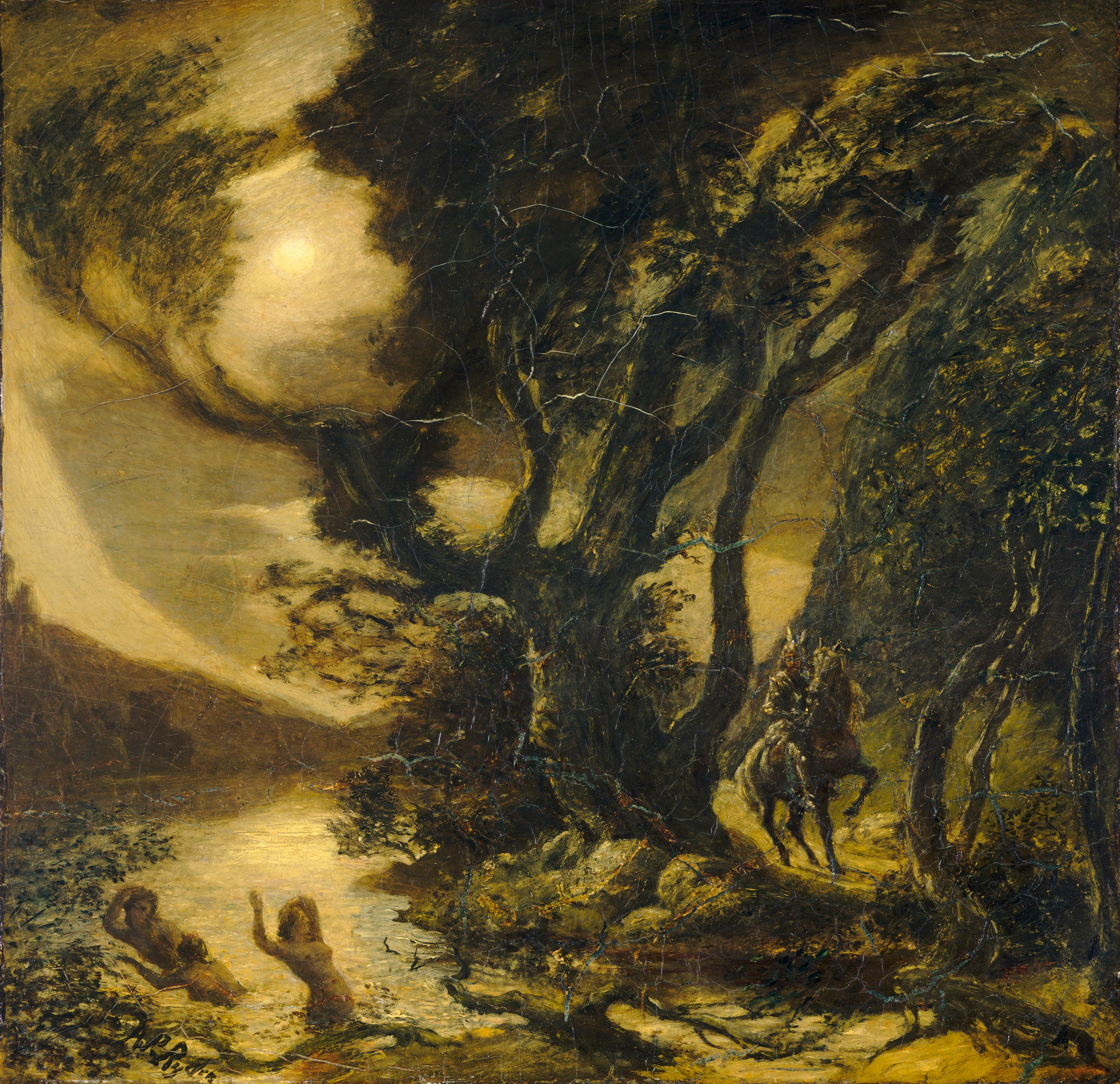
Siegfried and the Rhine Maidens (1888–1891), by Albert Pinkham Ryder, National Gallery of Art, Washington D. C.

Self-taught, Ryder produced landscapes and seascapes, two genres not often treated by the Symbolists, but with a visionary air that made them—in his own words—something "better than nature, which vibrated with the emotion of a new creation". Inspired by the work of Shakespeare, Byron, Wagner and Poe, as well as the Bible and mythology, his works express a subject matter relating to evil and death.

Davies also produced landscapes of an allegorical type, denoting Symbolist influence through his predilection for dreamlike and sensual subject matter, as well as the romantic and decorative. He was one of the organizers of the Armory Show, which presented in the United States the works of Symbolist artists, as well as Impressionists, Fauvists and Cubists. He was influenced by Böcklin and Pre-Raphaelitism.

Settled in Rome from 1867, from where he occasionally returned to his homeland, Vedder was influenced by Pre-Raphaelitism and Odilon Redon, and although he often chose historical and religious subjects—as well as landscapes—he reinterpreted them in the Symbolist mode, in fantastic and allegorical images in which detailist figuration is subordinated to symbolic content, as in The Cup of Death (1885, Virginia Museum of Fine Arts, Richmond).

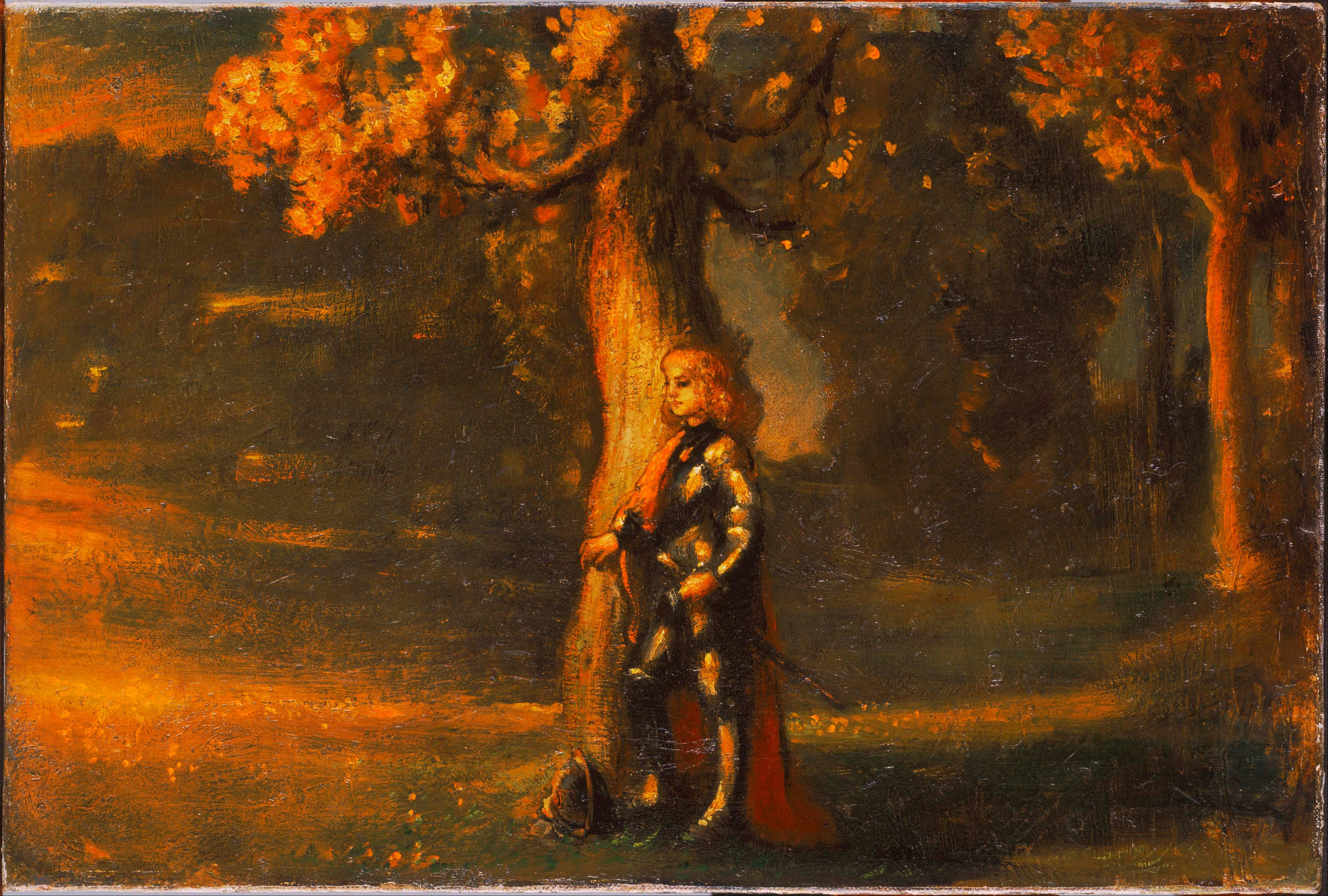
Visions of Glory (1896), by Arthur Bowen Davies, Phillips Collection, Washington D. C.

Alexander was a painter and illustrator, trained in Munich, Florence and Venice between 1877 and 1881. After a stay in New York where he excelled as a portraitist, he lived in Paris between 1890 and 1901, where he frequented Whistler, Rodin, Mallarmé and Henry James. He was director of the National Academy of Design. He excelled especially in female portraiture.

Maurice Prendergast was also an artist with considerable ties to Europe: between 1891 and 1894 he studied at the Julian and Colarossi academies, and was influenced especially by Manet, Whistler, Seurat, Toulouse-Lautrec and the Nabis. During the turn of the century his work was closer to Impressionism, and it was in the mid-1910s that he came closer to Symbolism, in works such as The Promenade (1914–1915, Detroit Institute of Arts). In the last phase of his work he moved closer to Matissian Fauvism.

Symbolism also influenced for a time John Singer Sargent, a classicist painter who excelled as a social portraitist, close at times to Impressionism. In 1895 he was commissioned to decorate the Boston Public Library, for which he developed a mural cycle based on The Progress of Religion that denotes the Symbolist influence, especially in the pagan deities of the Near East.

It is worth mentioning lastly James Abbott McNeill Whistler, an American painter based in the United Kingdom who, although linked above all to Impressionism, is sometimes associated with Symbolism because of his idealistic conception of art, which he considered "a divinity of delicate essence". He stayed for a time in France, where he studied at the École des Beaux-Arts with Charles Gleyre. There he met Legros and Fantin-Latour, with whom he founded the Société des Trois. In 1859 he settled in London, although he continued to travel frequently to France. He was an eminent dandy and advocate of l'art pour l'art, and rejected in painting any narrative or moral component; according to him, if music is the painting of the ear, painting must be the painting of the eye. His style was light, with simple colors and somewhat abstract tonalities. Whistler distances himself from Symbolism because of its absence of metaphysical content, but he contributed important concepts to Symbolist theory, such as the autonomy of art from any moral concept. Symbolism was also influenced by his taste for Japanese art, his decoration using patterns inspired by peacock feathers, and his tendency to title his works with musical concepts such as "nocturne", "arrangement", and "symphony".

== See also ==
- History of painting
- Symbolist paintings
- Aestheticism
- Decadent movement
- Art for art's sake
- Fin de siècle

== Bibliography ==
- Aguilera, Emiliano M. (1972). El desnudo en las artes (in Spanish). Madrid: Giner.
- Asunción, Josep (2002). Luz y color. Barcelona: Parramón. ISBN 84-342-2472-0.
- Beardsley, Monroe C.; Hospers, John (1990). Estética. Historia y fundamentos (in Spanish). Madrid: Cátedra. ISBN 84-376-0085-5.
- Buendía, J. Rogelio; Gállego, Julián (2003). Summa Artis XXXIV. Arte europeo y norteamericano del siglo XIX (in Spanish). Madrid: Espasa-Calpe. ISBN 84-239-5276-2.
- Chilvers, Ian (2007). Diccionario de arte (in Spanish). Madrid: Alianza Editorial. ISBN 978-84-206-6170-4.
- Dempsey, Amy (2002). Estilos, escuelas y movimientos (in Spanish). Barcelona: Blume. ISBN 84-89396-86-8.
- Diccionario Larousse de la Pintura (in Spanish). Barcelona: Planeta-Agostini. 1988. ISBN 84-395-0976-6.
- Dobai, Johannes; Coradeschi, Sergio (1981). La obra pictórica completa de Klimt (in Spanish). Barcelona: Noguer. ISBN 84-279-8768-4.
- Eco, Umberto (2004). Historia de la belleza (in Spanish). Barcelona: Lumen. ISBN 84-264-1468-0.
- Eco, Umberto; Calabrese, Omar (1987). El tiempo en la pintura. Madrid: Mondadori. pp. spanish. ISBN 84-397-1143-3.
- Enciclopedia del Arte Garzanti (in Spanish). Madrid: Ediciones B. 1991. ISBN 84-406-2261-9.
- Fahr-Becker, Gabriele (2008). El modernismo (in Spanish). Potsdam: Ullmann. ISBN 978-3-8331-6377-7.
- Fernández Polanco, Aurora (1989). Fin de siglo: Simbolismo y Art Nouveau (in Spanish). Madrid: Historia 16.
- García Felguera, María de los Santos (1993). Las vanguardias históricas (2) (in Spanish). Madrid: Historia 16.
- Gibson, Michael (2006). El simbolismo (in Spanish). Taschen. ISBN 978-3-8228-5030-5.
- Givone, Sergio (2001). Historia de la estética (in Spanish). Madrid: Tecnos. ISBN 84-309-1897-3.
- Hamilton, George Heard (1989). Pintura y escultura en Europa 1880/1940 (in Spanish). Madrid: Cátedra. ISBN 84-376-0230-0.
- Hofstätter, Hans H. (1981). Historia de la pintura modernista europea (in Spanish). Barcelona: Blume. ISBN 84-7031-286-3.
- Honour, Hugh; Fleming, John (2002). Historia mundial del arte (in Spanish). Madrid: Akal. ISBN 84-460-2092-0.
- Lemaire, Gérard-Georges (1997). Simbolismo (in Spanish). Barcelona: Polígrafa. ISBN 84-343-0836-3.
- Lucie-Smith, Edward (1991). El arte simbolista (in Spanish). Barcelona: Destino. ISBN 84-233-2032-4.
- Mas Marqués, María José (2000). Picasso (in Spanish). Madrid: Susaeta. ISBN 978-84-677-4077-6.
- Pijoán, José; Gaya Nuño, Juan Antonio (1967). Summa Artis XXIII. Arte europeo de los siglos XIX y XX (in Spanish). Madrid: Espasa Calpe.
- Socías, Jaume (1987). Modernisme a Catalunya. Pintura (in Catalan). Barcelona: Nou Art Thor. ISBN 84-7327-149-1.
- Tarabra, Daniela (2009). Los estilos del arte (in Spanish). Milan: Electa.
- Tazartes, Maurizia (1999). Rousseau (in Spanish). Barcelona: Planeta DeAgostini. ISBN 84-395-7437-1.
- Wolf, Norbert (2009). Simbolismo (in Spanish). Köln: Taschen. ISBN 978-3-8228-5480-8.
