= William Degouve de Nuncques =

Belgian painter

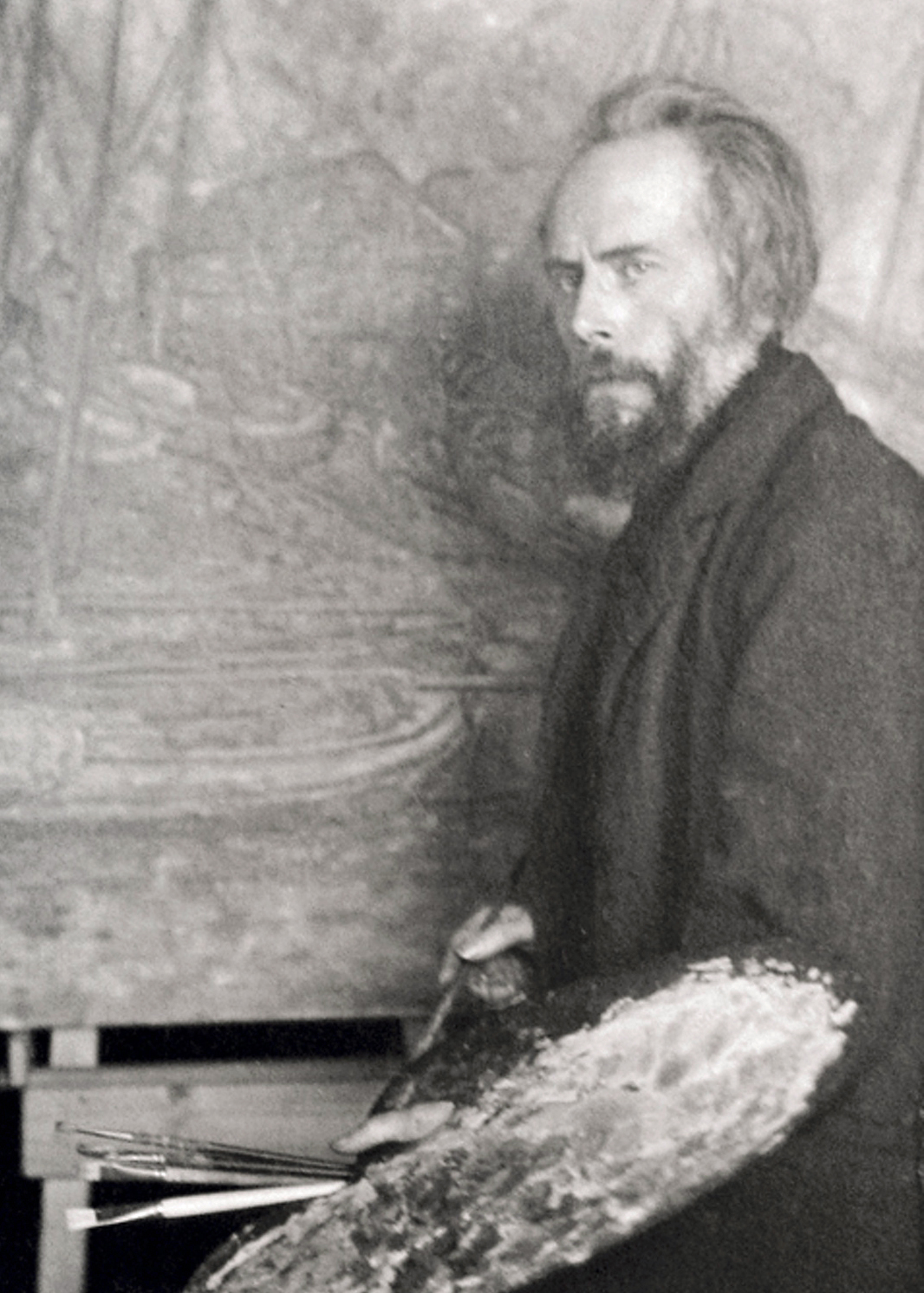
- Born: 28 February 1867; Monthermé, Ardennes, France
- Died: 1 March 1935 (aged 68); Stavelot, Belgium
- Known for: Painting
- Movement: Symbolism

William Degouve de Nuncques (28 February 1867 – 1 March 1935) was a Belgian painter who was associated with the symbolist movement, although he is occasionally referred to as a postimpressionist. He is best known for his nocturnal landscapes, inundated with strange atmosphere and at times visionary subjects. He continued to paint compelling landscapes into the early decades of the 20th century but the overt symbolist qualities slowly dissipated from his work after 1900.

== Biography ==
He was born in the Ardennes commune of Monthermé, to an old aristocratic family. After the Franco-Prussian War (1870–71), his parents settled in Belgium. Art historian Robert Delevoy wrote that he inherited a strong personality and a passion for spirituality from his father, "and when still young, he showed a tendency to indulge in spleen, reverie, and contemplation, instead of action." He briefly enrolled in the Brussels Academy, but he soon left without completing his studies and largely taught himself to paint. He met the Dutch artist Jan Toorop in 1883, and a strong friendship developed. Degouve de Nuncques shared a studio with Jan Toorop, and later with Henry de Groux, and these two artists are said to have had a significant influence on his early development. In 1894, he married fellow artist Juliette Massin, who introduced him to the circle of Symbolist poets, who had a considerable influence on his style. He belonged to the avant-garde group Les XX and later exhibited at La Libre Esthétique. He travelled widely and painted views of Italy, Austria, and France, often of parks at night. He designed the sets for Maurice Maeterlinck's play Interior (1895).

From 1900 to 1902, Degouve and his wife lived in the Balearic Islands, where he painted the rugged coastline and the orange groves. After suffering a religious crisis around 1910, he painted pictures that revealed his tormented state of mind, and during World War I, while a refugee in the Netherlands, he produced only minor works. In 1919, he was overwhelmed by the death of his wife and lost the use of one hand. In 1930, he married the woman who had helped him through the crisis. They settled in Stavelot, where he spent his last few years painting snow-covered landscapes.

== Art ==
Degouve is supposed to have said, "To make a painting, all you need to do is to take some paints, draw some lines, and fill the rest up with feelings." A regular exhibitor in Paris, he was championed by Puvis de Chavannes and Maurice Denis.

His best-known pictures, The Blind House [aka The Pink House] (1892), The Angels (1894), and Peacocks (1896), demonstrate the magical quality of his work. The Blind House is thought to have been an influence on the Surrealist, especially the paintings of René Magritte and his series The Empire of Lights.

The largest collection of his paintings, with over 20 oils and pastels, as well as prints and drawings, is in the Kröller-Müller Museum, Otterlo.

== Gallery ==
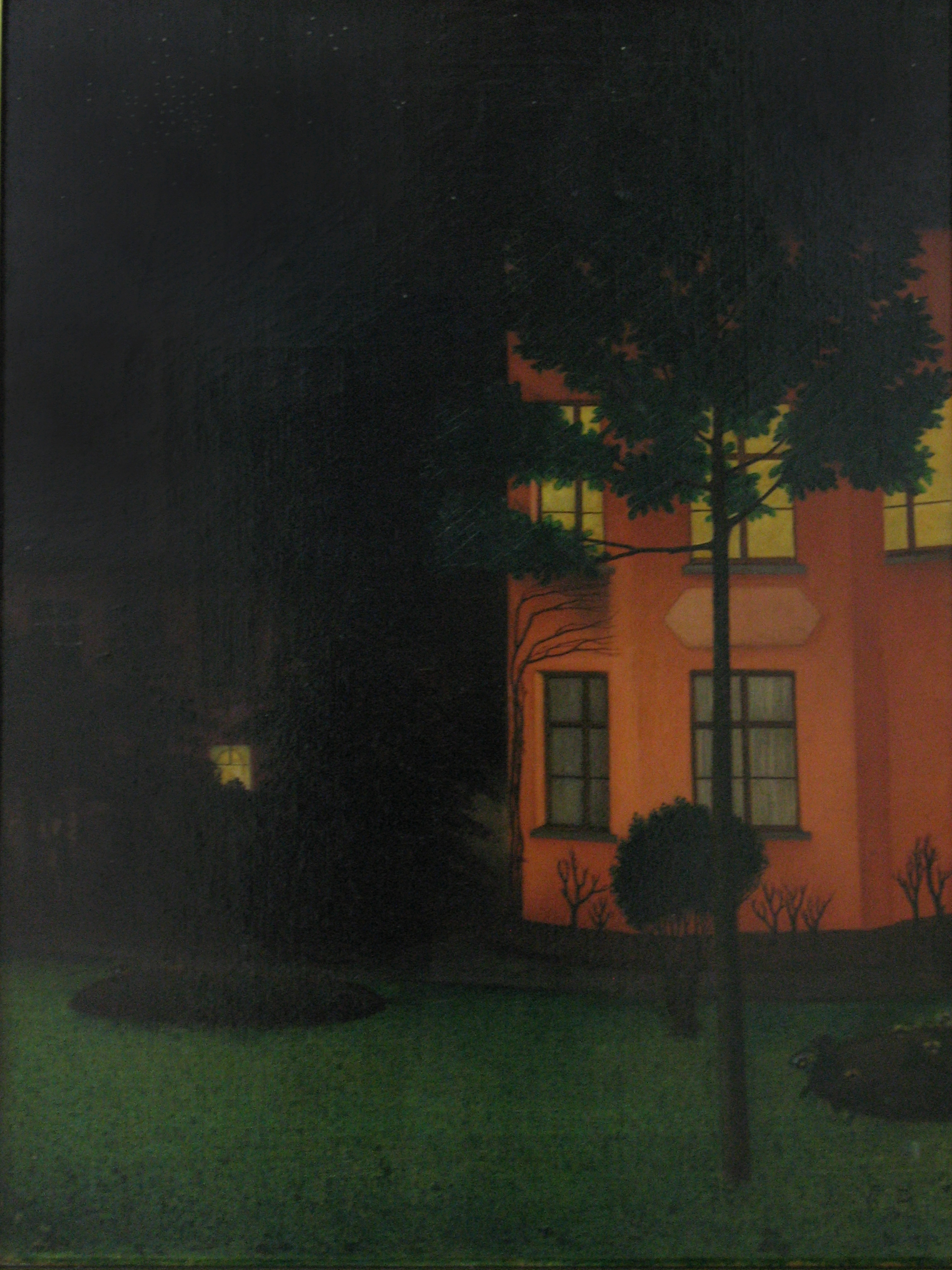
The Blind House (1892), Kröller-Müller Museum, Otterlo

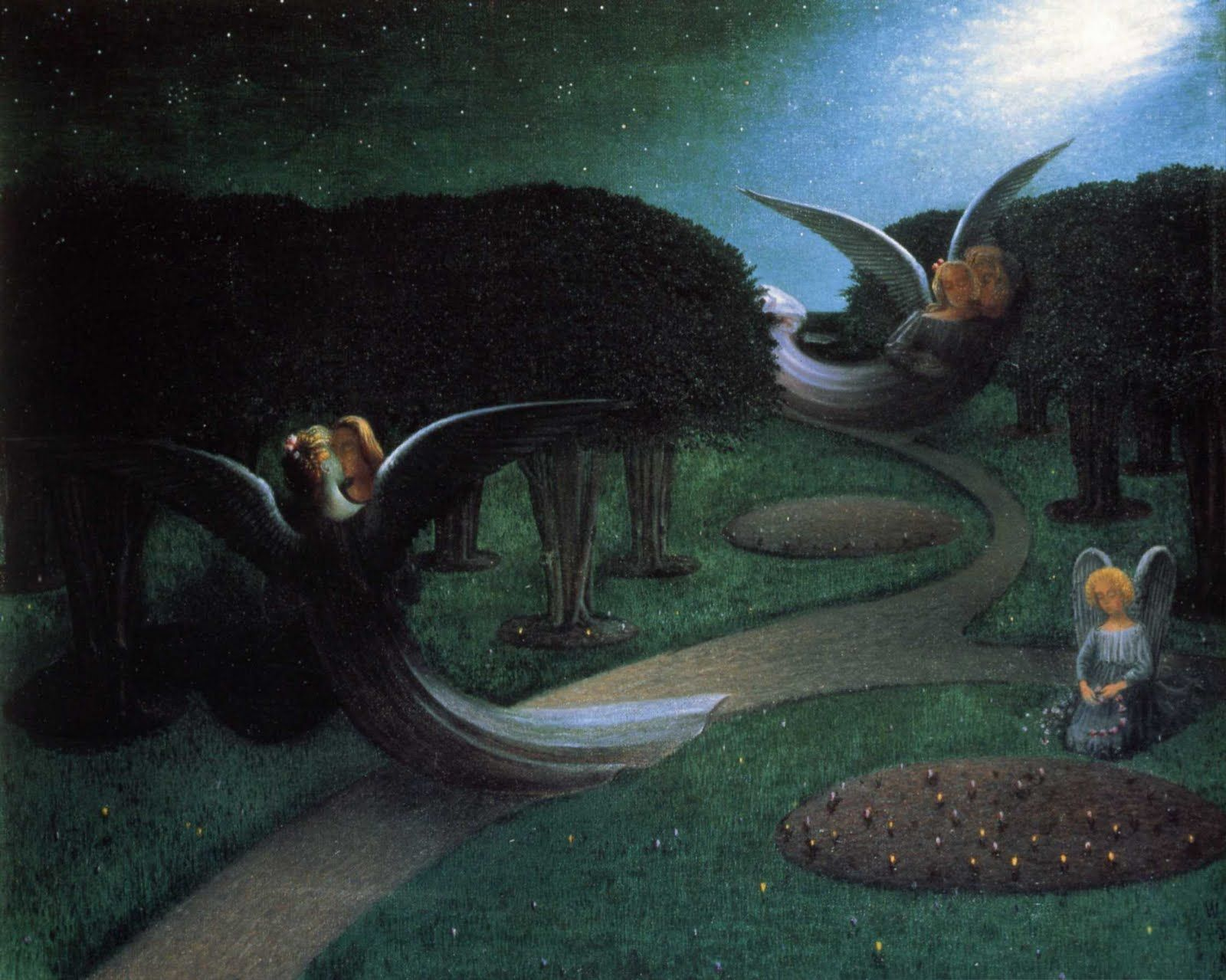
Angels in the Night (1894), oil on canvas, 47.9 x 60 cm., Museo Kröller-Müller, Otterlo

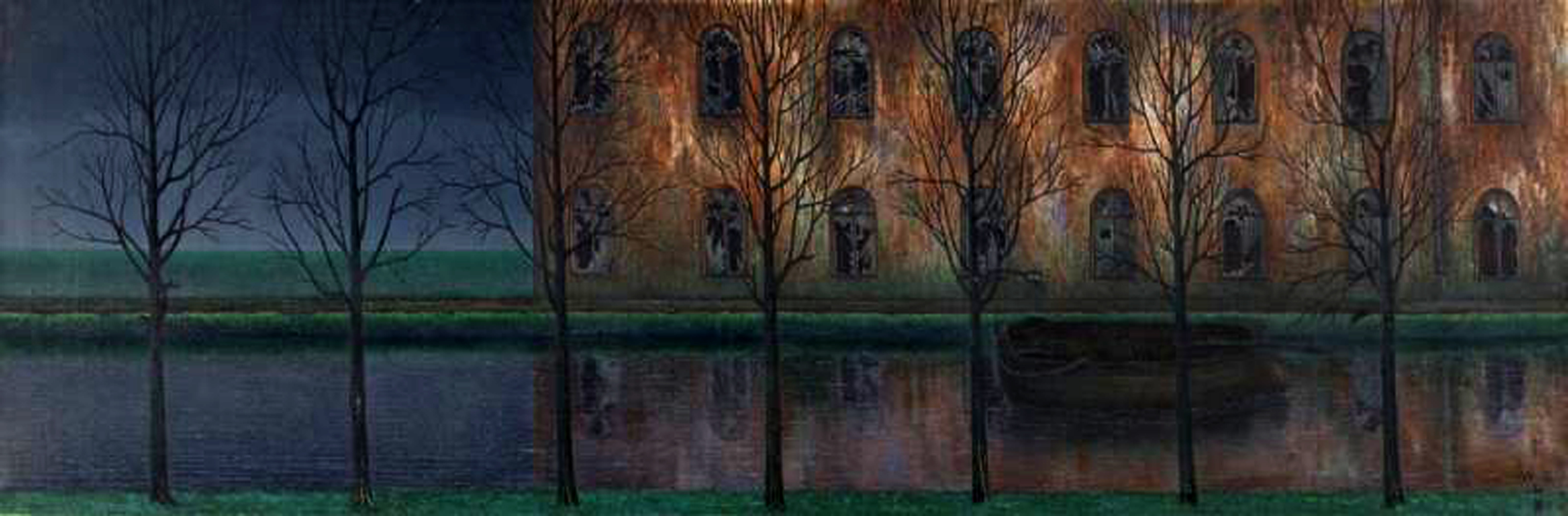
The Canal (1894), oil on canvas, 42,4 x 122,5 cm., Kröller-Müller Museum, Otterlo

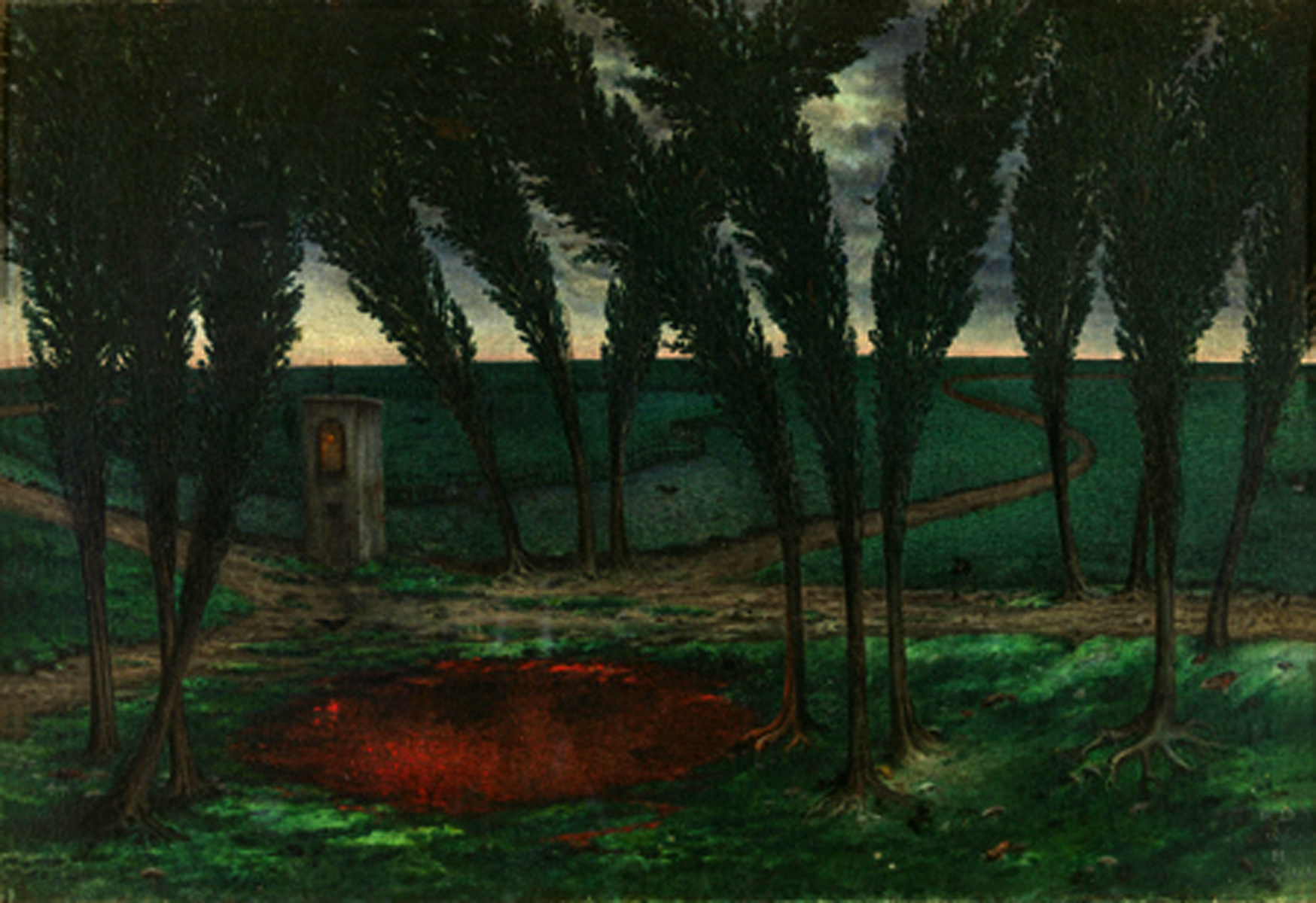
Pool of Blood (1884), oil on canvas, 44 x 64 cm., Royal Museums of Fine Arts of Belgium, Brussels

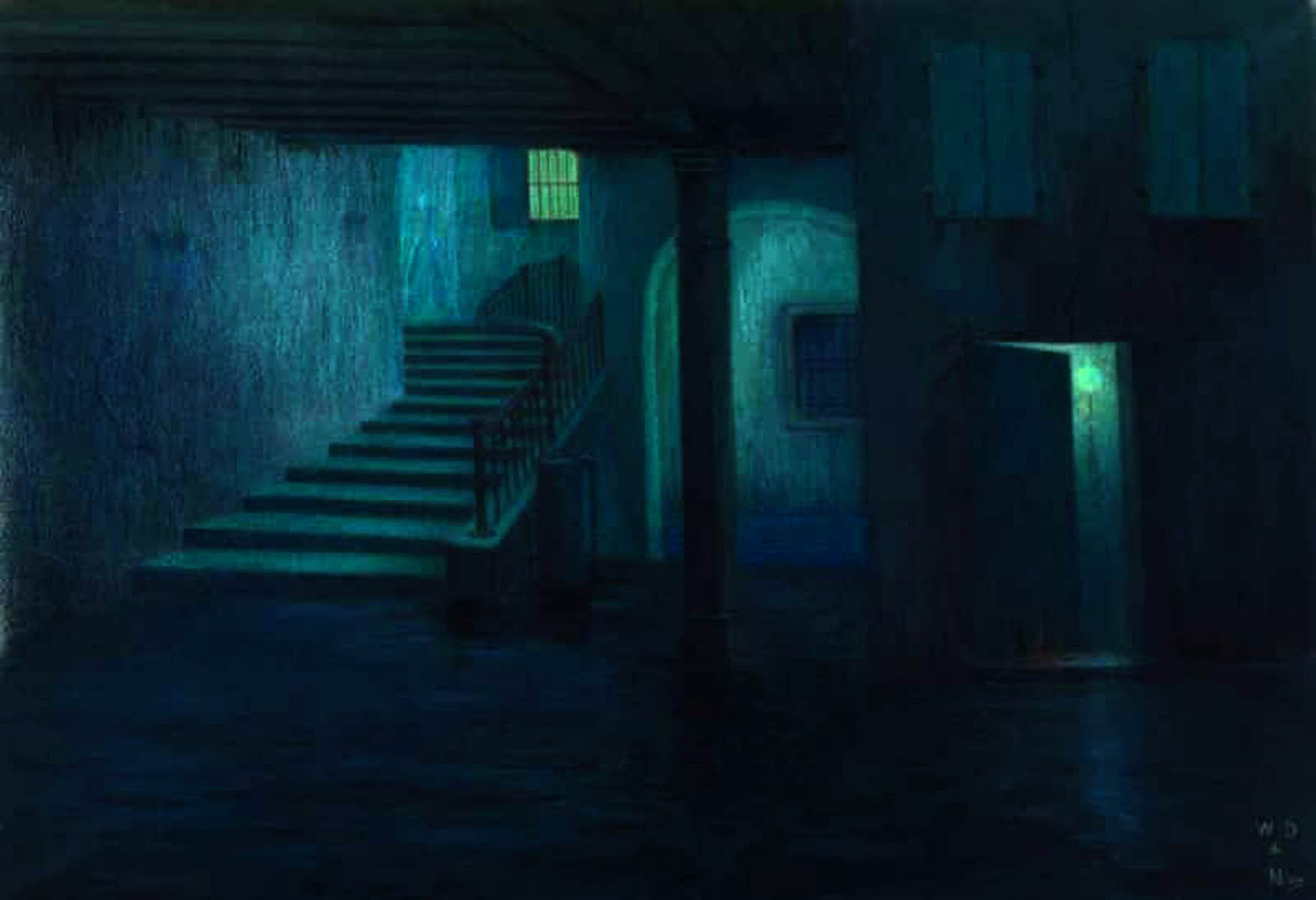
In Venice (1895), pastel on cardboard, 53 x 76 cm., Kröller-Müller Museum, Otterlo

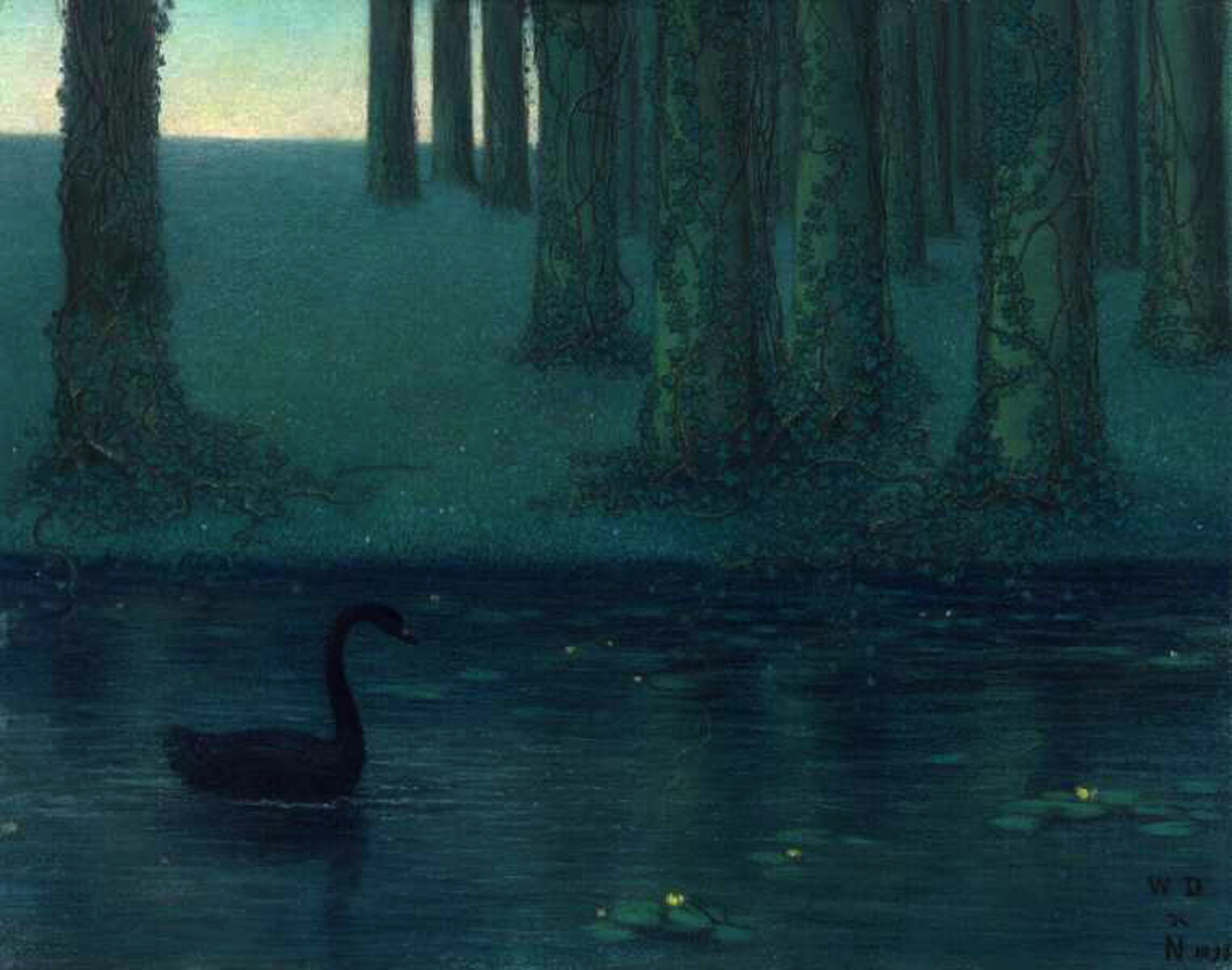
The Black Swan (1895), pastel on cardboard, 38 x 47 cm., Kröller-Müller Museum, Otterlo

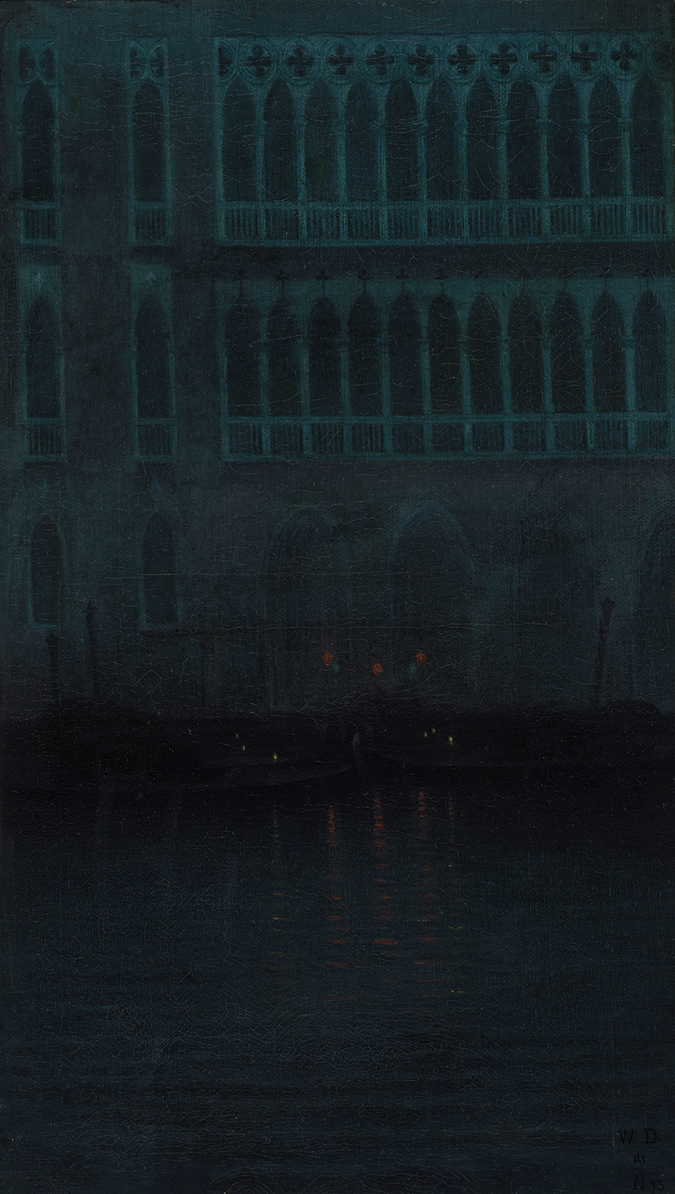
Night in Venice (1895), oil, 60 x 34 cm., Groeningemuseum, Bruges

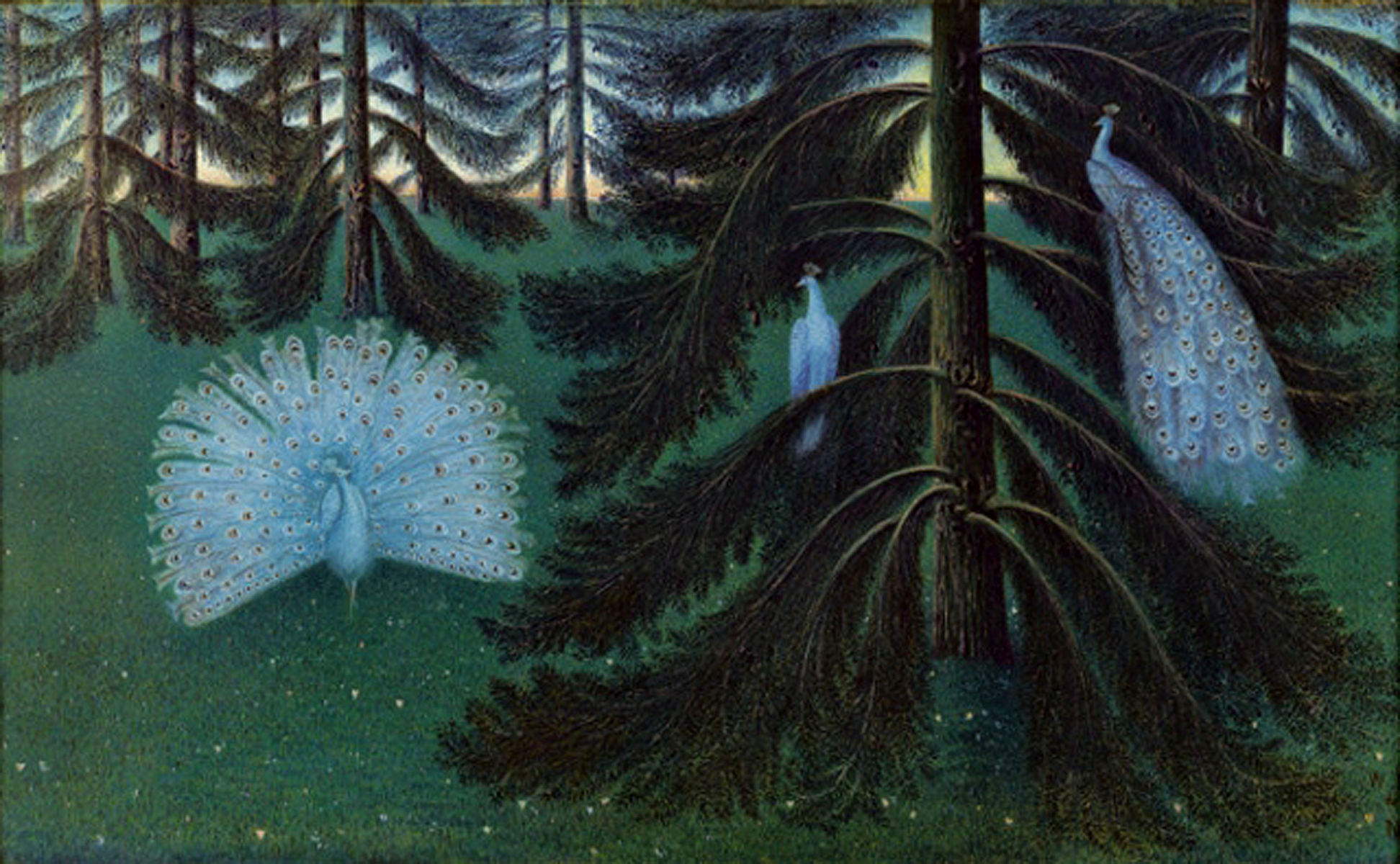
The Peacocks (1896), pastel on paper, mounted on canvas, 59.5 x 99 cm., Royal Museums of Fine Arts of Belgium, Brussels

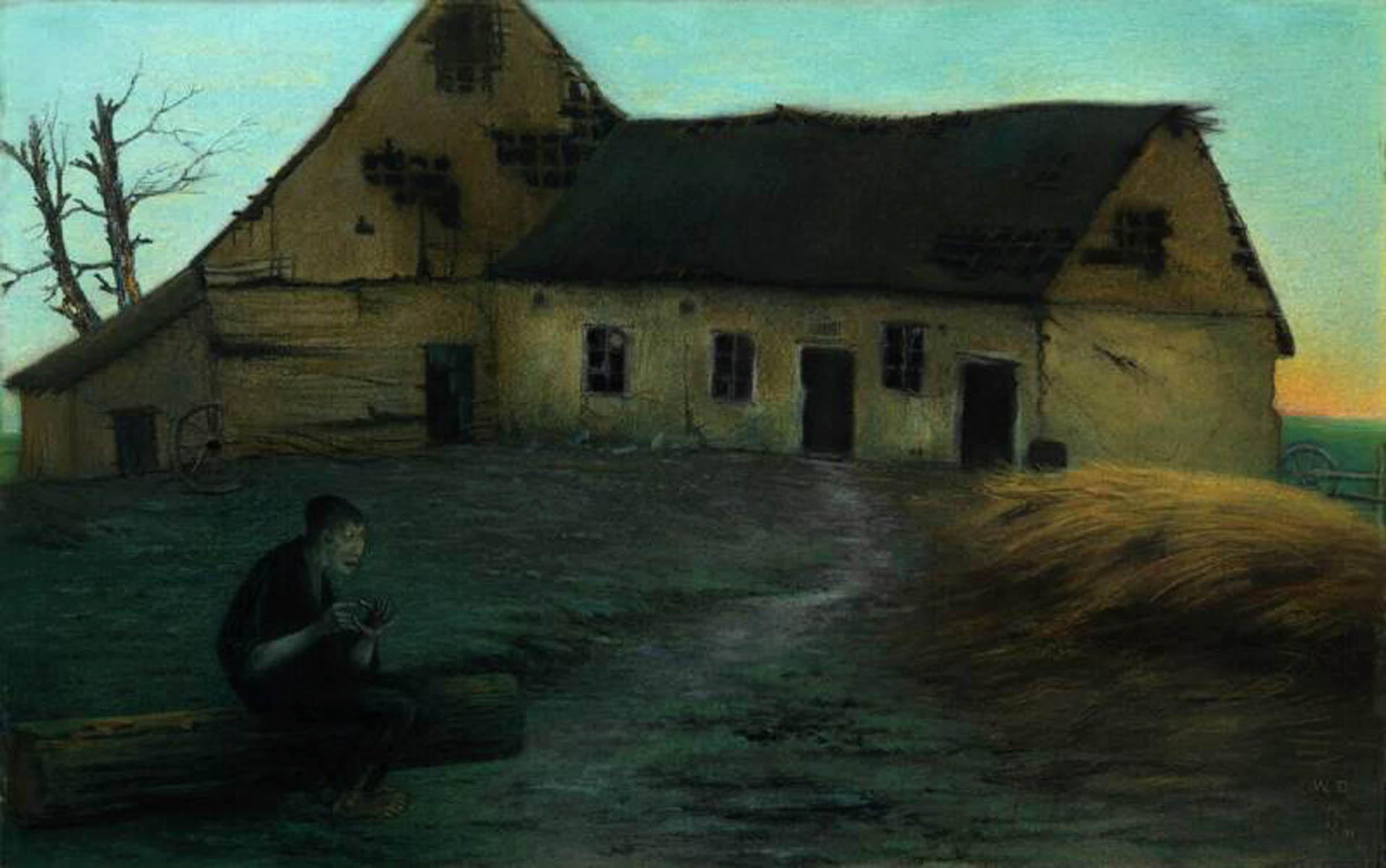
Decay (1897), pastel on cardboard, 57 x 83 cm., Kröller-Müller Museum, Otterlo

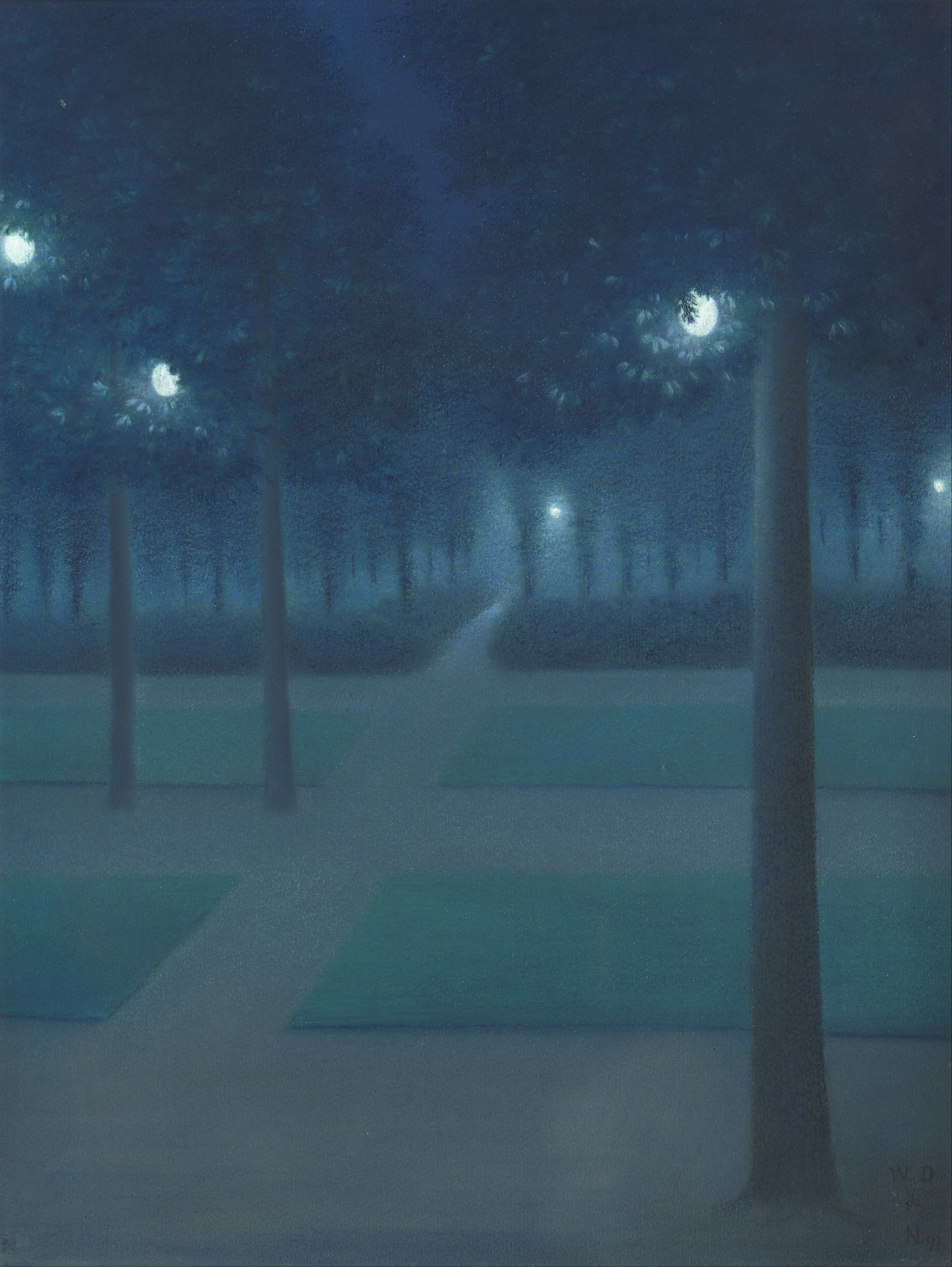
Nocturn in the Parc Royal, Brussels (1897), pastel, 65 x 50 cm., Musée d'Orsay, Paris

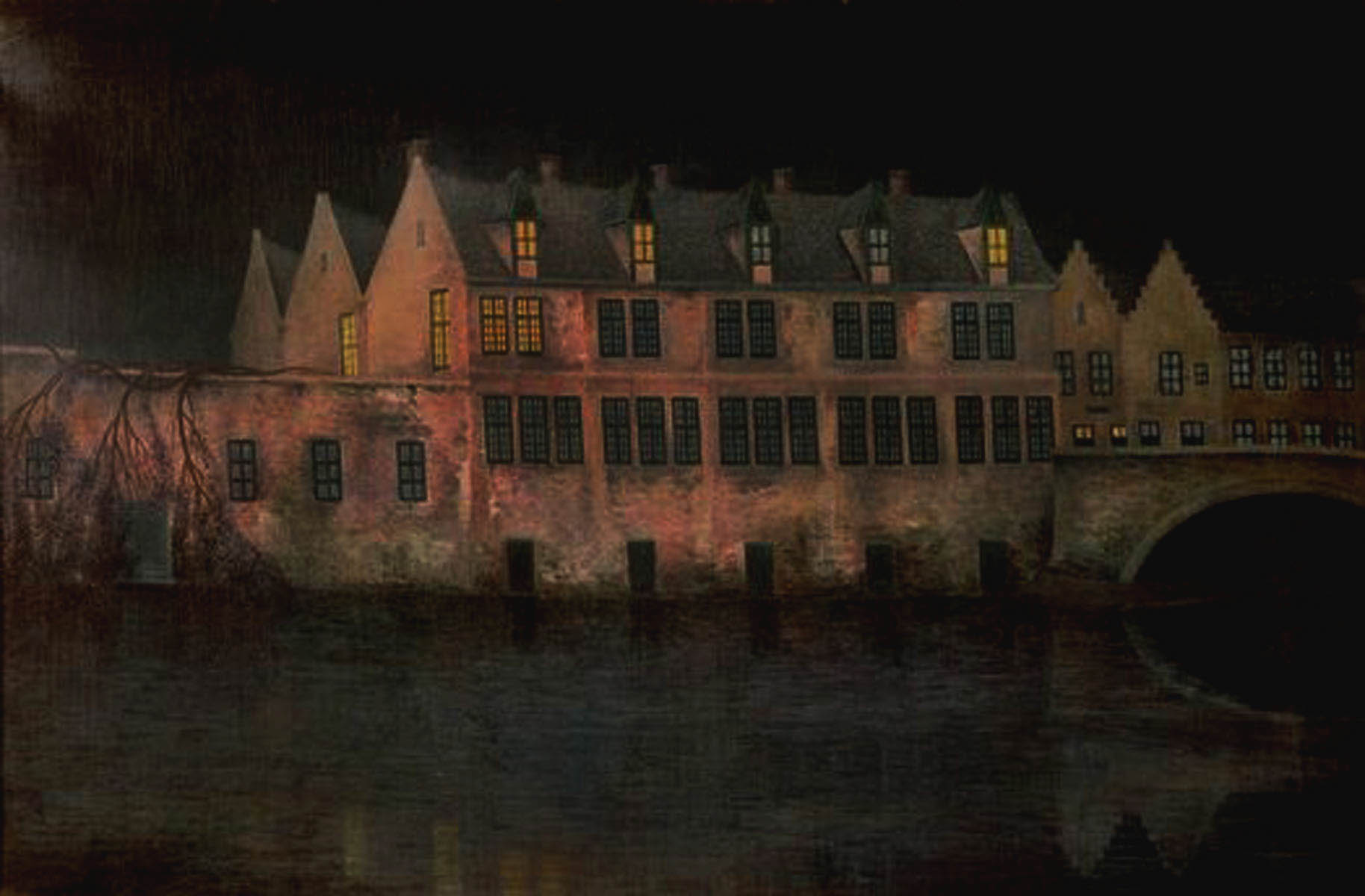
Night in Bruges (1897), oil on canvas, 59.7 x 90.1 cm., private collection

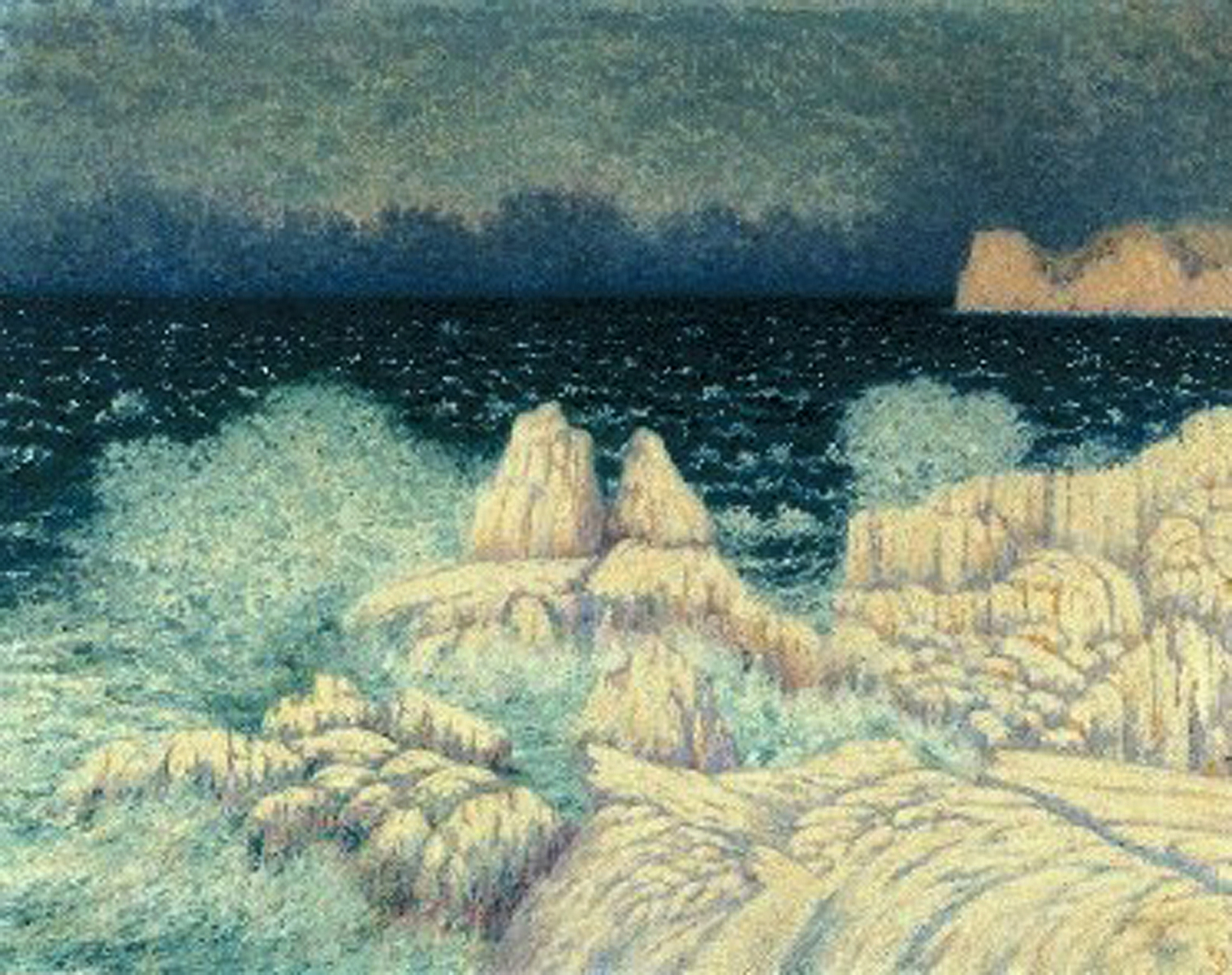
Storm on the North Coast: Mallorca, Cala San Vicente (1900), oil on canvas, 73 x 92.5., Royal Museums of Fine Arts of Belgium, Brussels

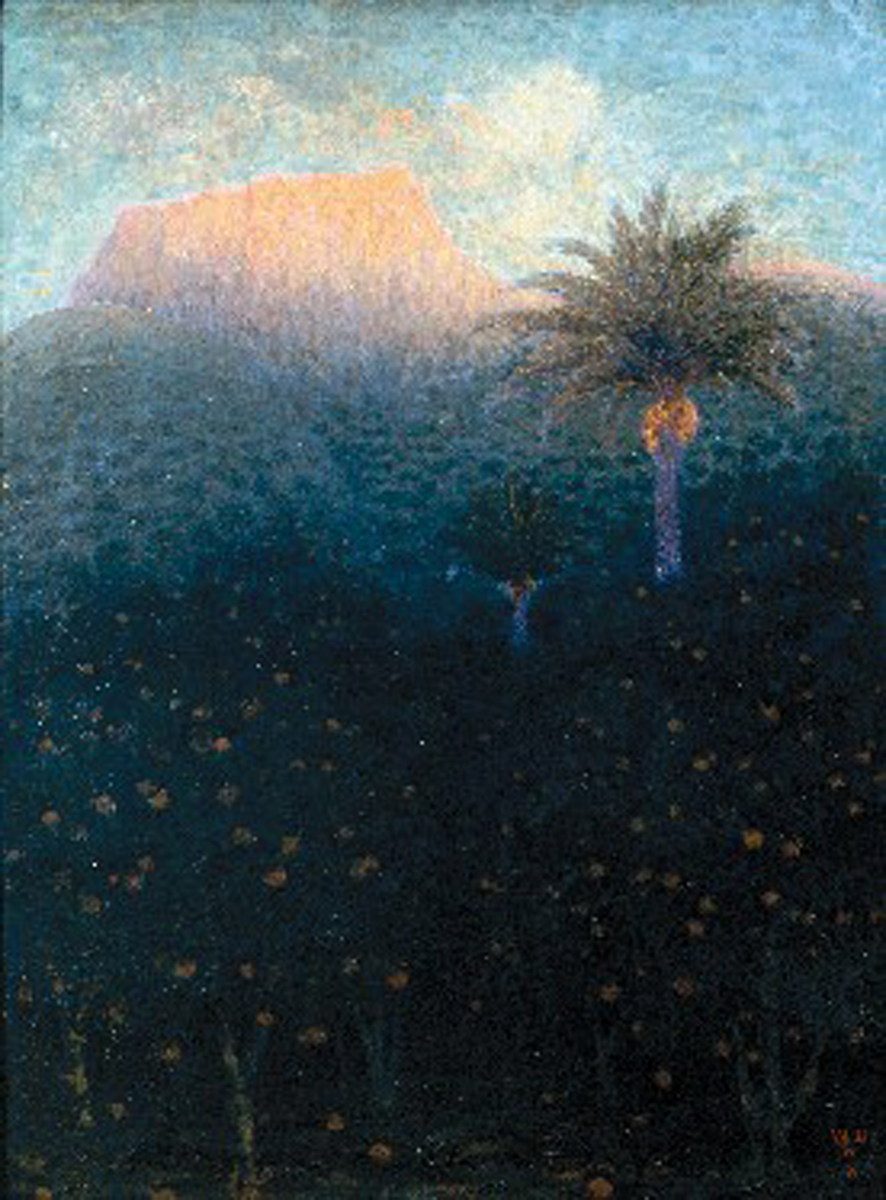
The Puig Major, Mallorca (1902), oil on canvas, 73.5 x 54.5 cm., Royal Museums of Fine Arts of Belgium, Brussels

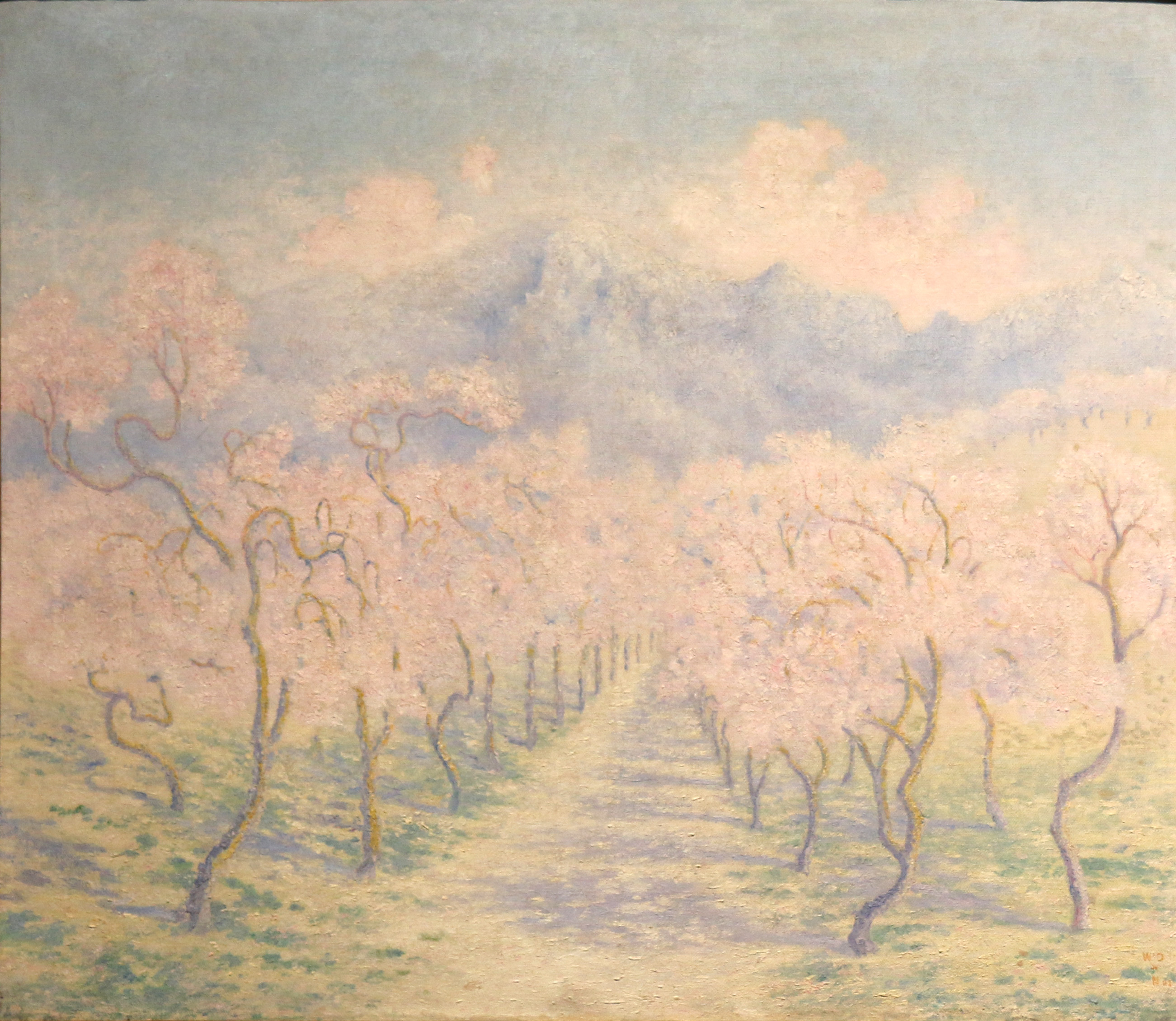
Almond Trees, Balearic (1902), 69 x 80 cm., Royal Museums of Fine Arts of Belgium, Brussels

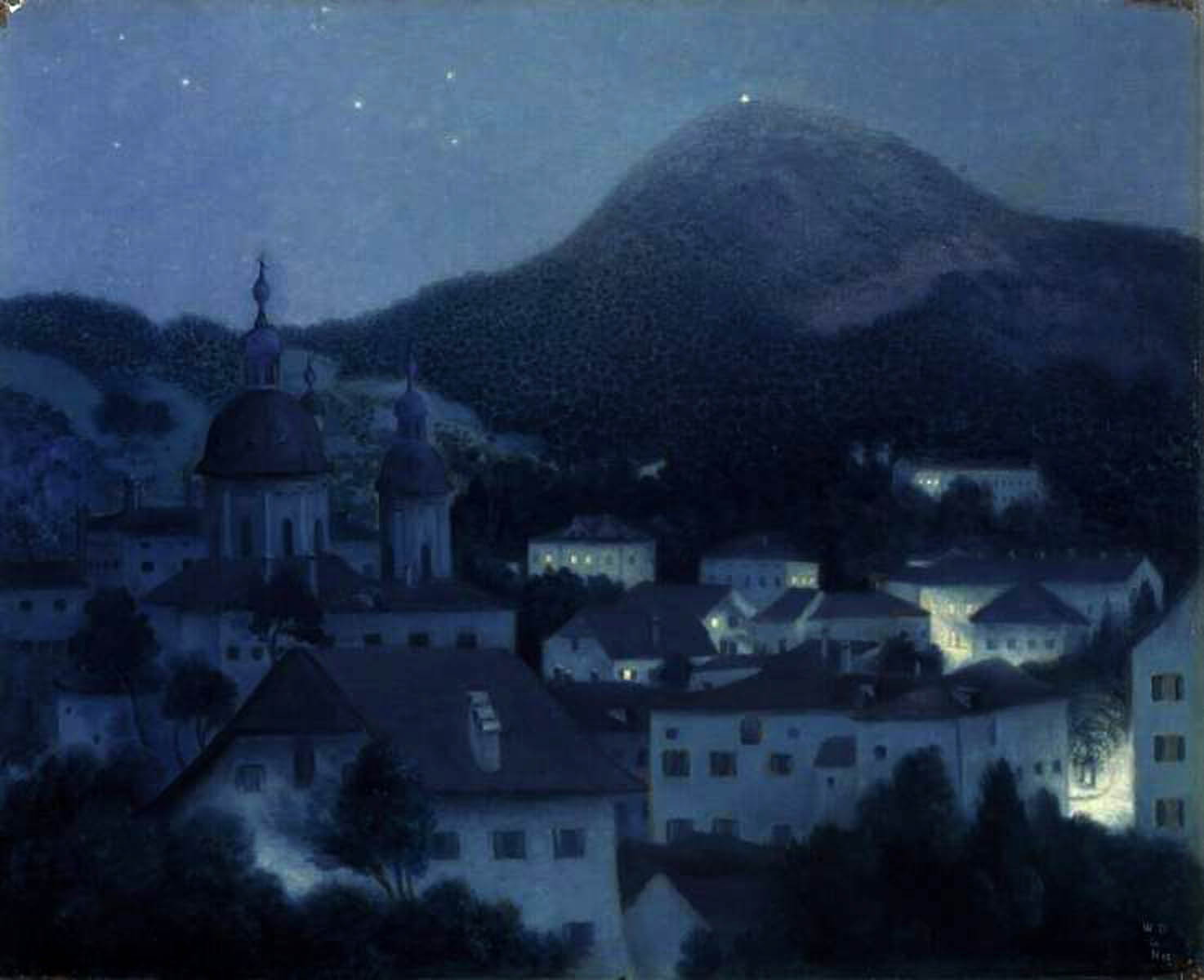
Night in Salzburg (1905), oil on canvas, 61 x 74 cm., Kröller-Müller Museum, Otterlo

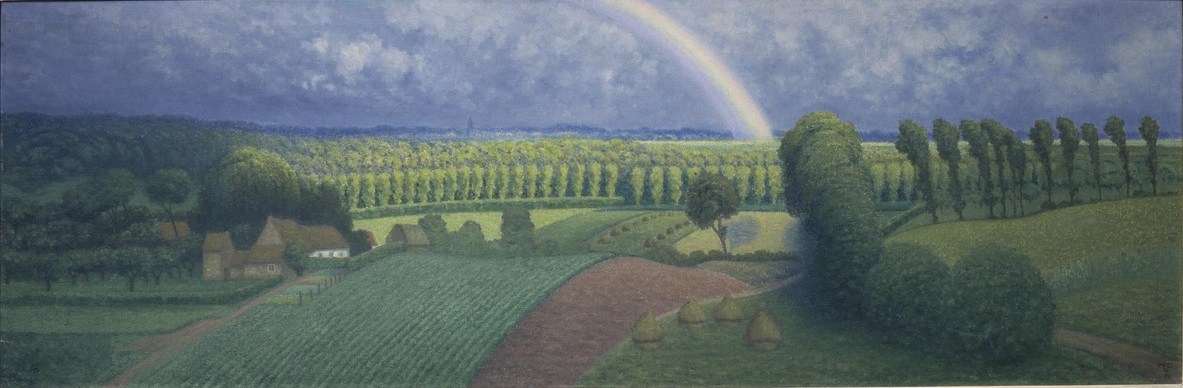
The Rainbow (c. 1910), oil on canvas, 50.5 x 150.5 cm., Centraal Museum, Utrecht

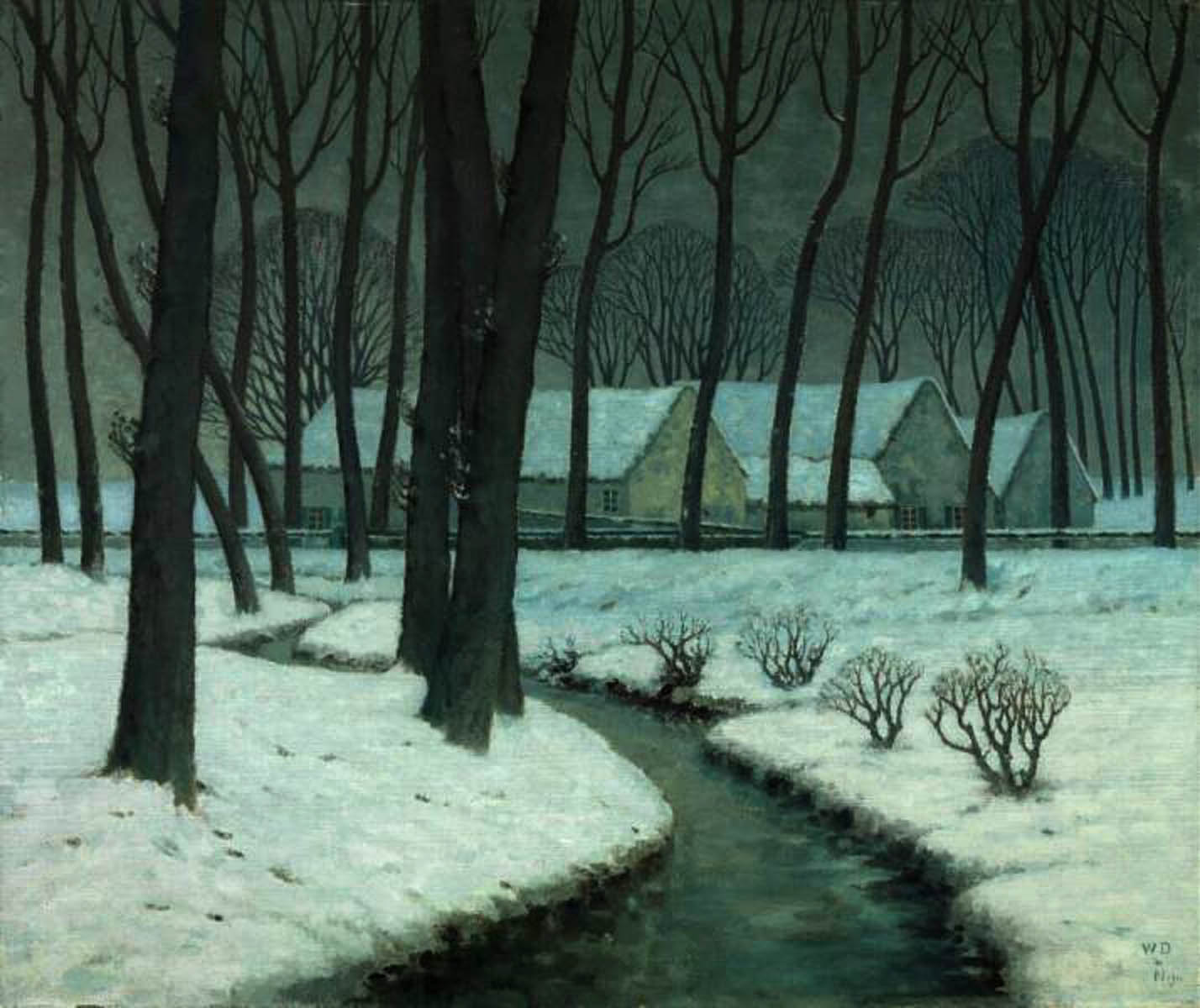
Hamlet in the Snow (1911), oil on canvas, 98 x 119 cm., Kröller-Müller Museum, Otterlo

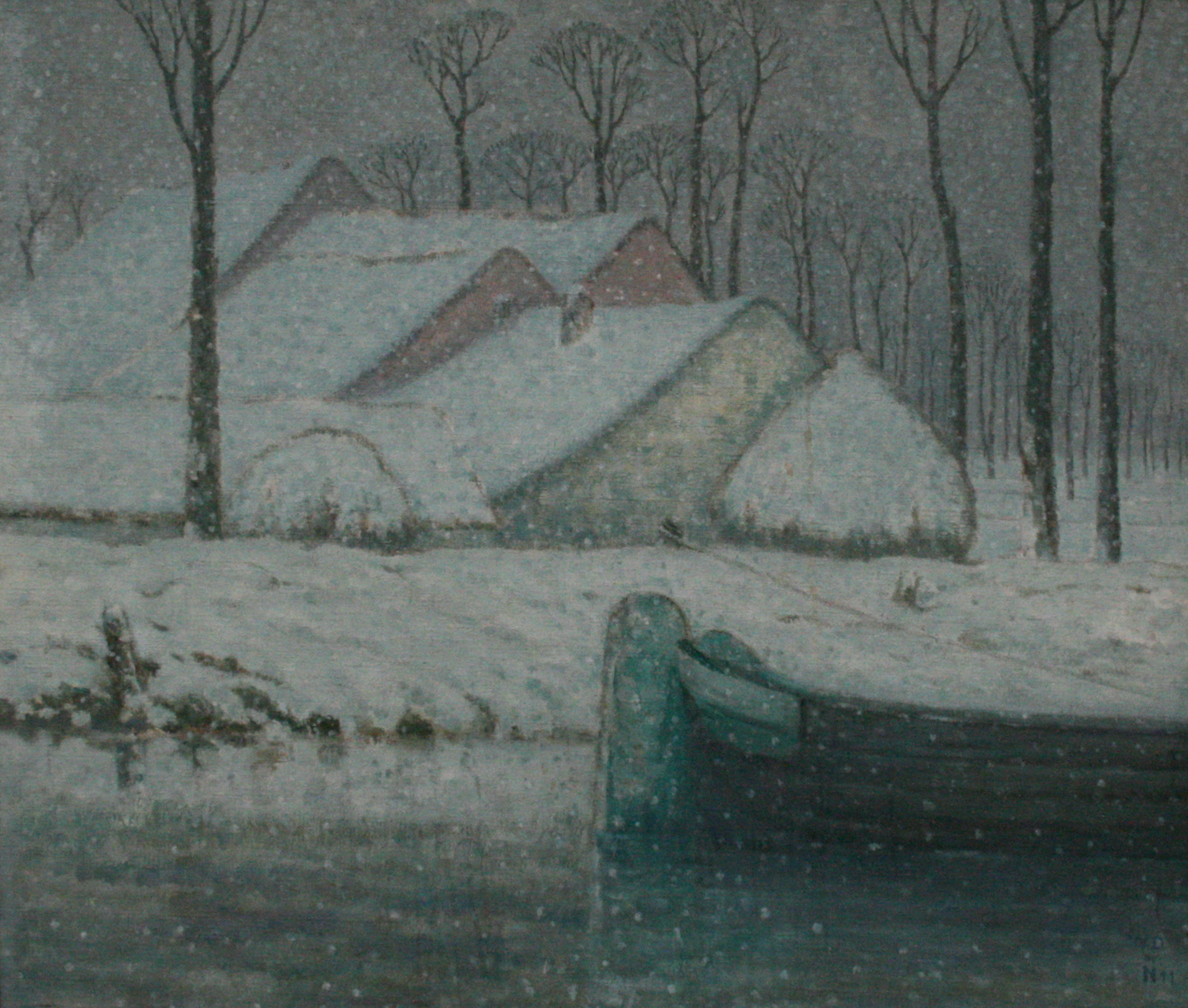
Snowy Landscape with Barge (1911)

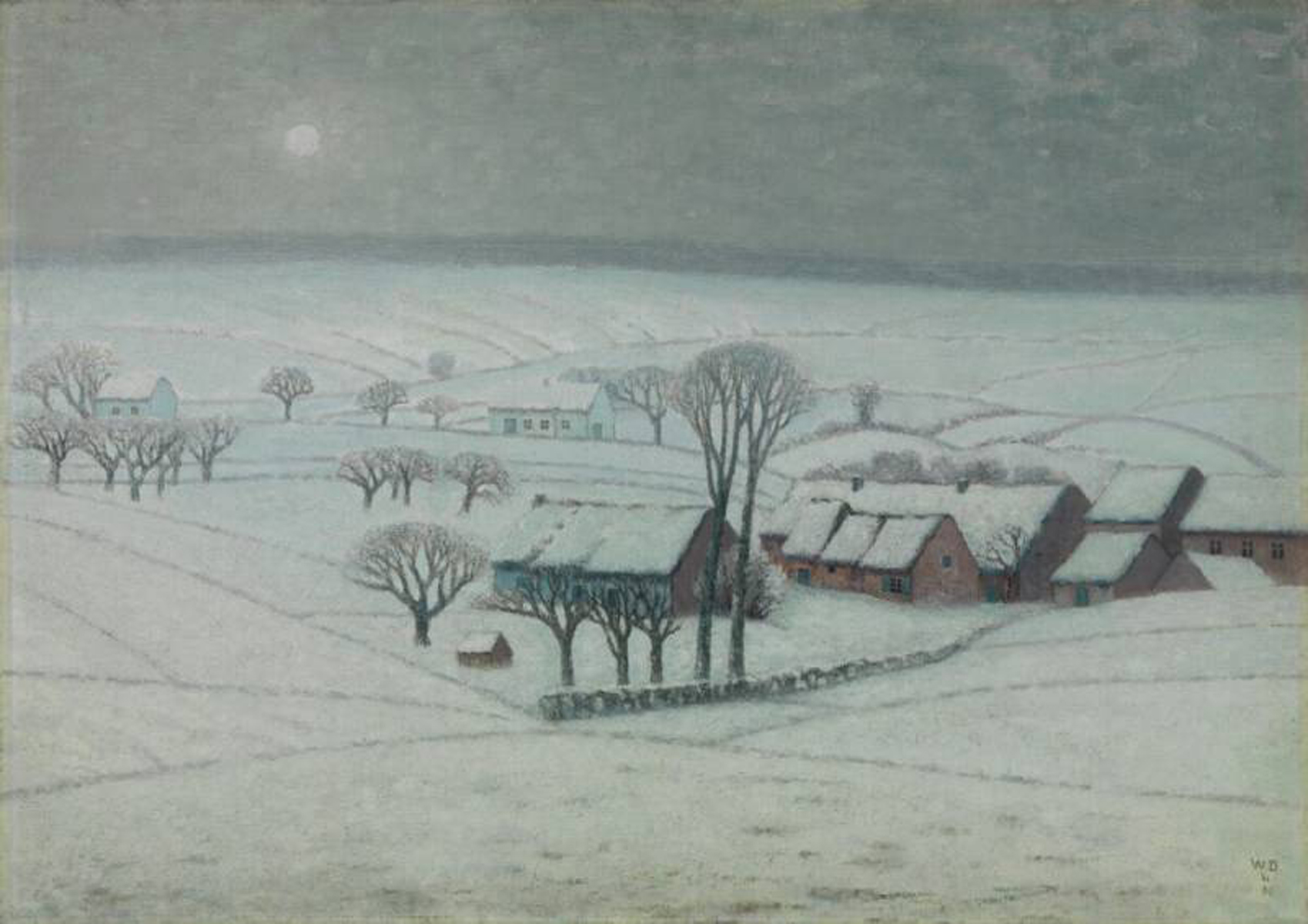
Snow Covered Plains (1911–12), oil on canvas, 68 x 96 cm., Kröller-Müller Museum, Otterlo

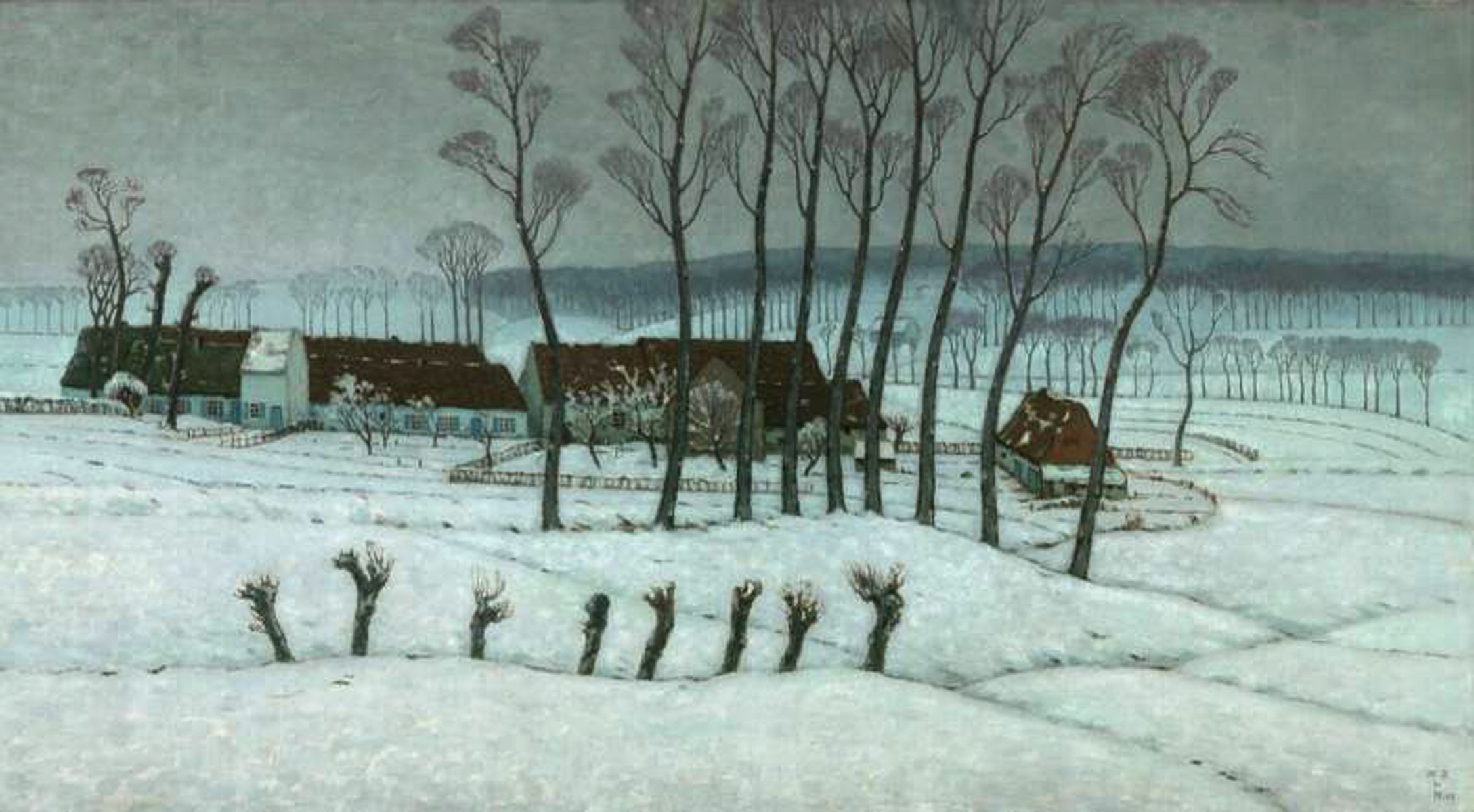
Snow at Berchem-Sainte-Agathe (1912), oil on canvas, 90,5 x 162 cm., Kröller-Müller Museum, Otterlo

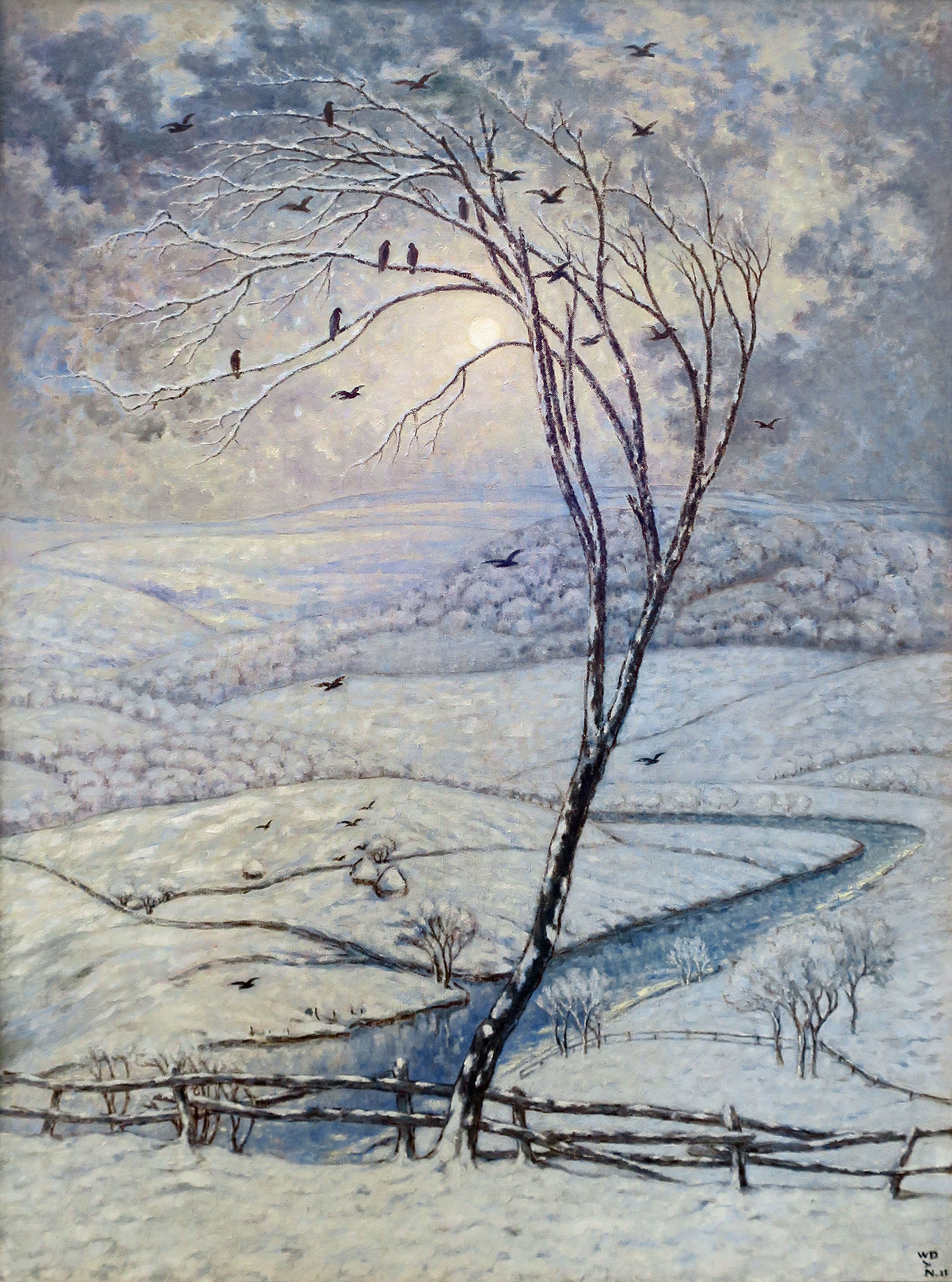
The Crows (1925), oil on canvas, 140 x 104 cm., Belgian State, Ministry of Culture, Administration of Fine Arts
