= Elisabeth de Groux =

Belgian engraver and painter

Élisabeth de Groux
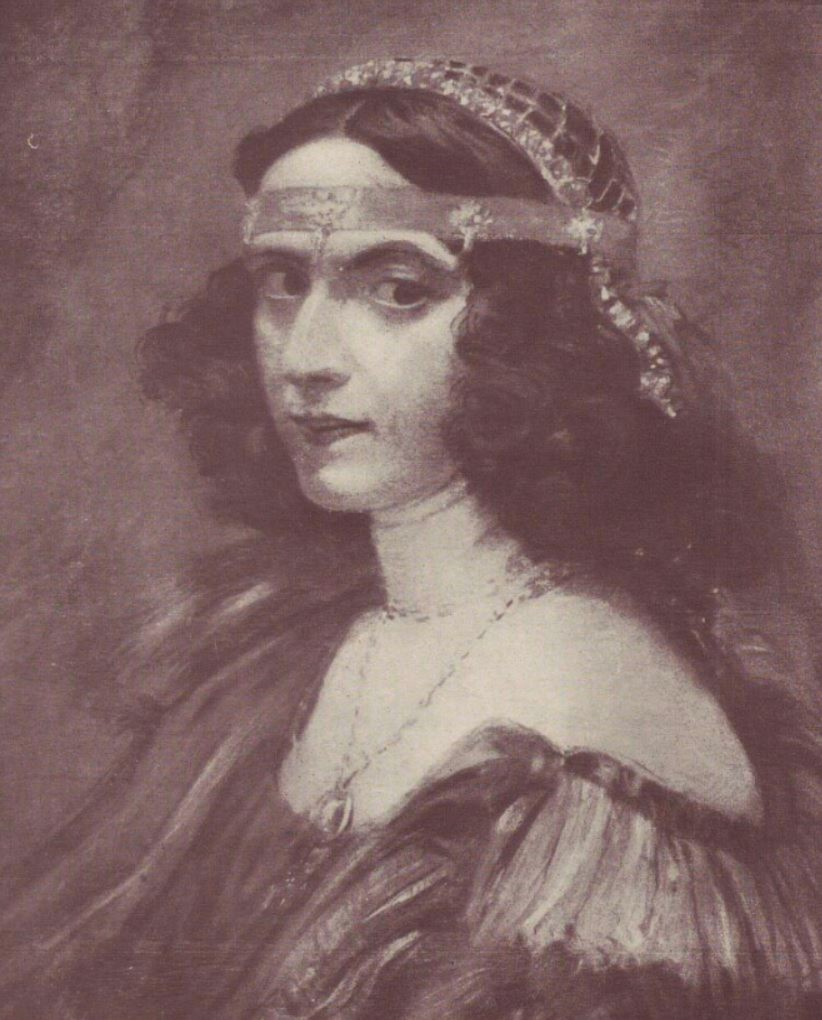
- Born: 4 November 1894; Boulogne-sur-Mer
- Died: 1949 (aged 54–55)
- Spouse: Emile Baumann
- Parent: Henry de Groux

Élisabeth de Groux (4 November 1894 – 1949) was a Belgian engraver and painter.

== Life ==
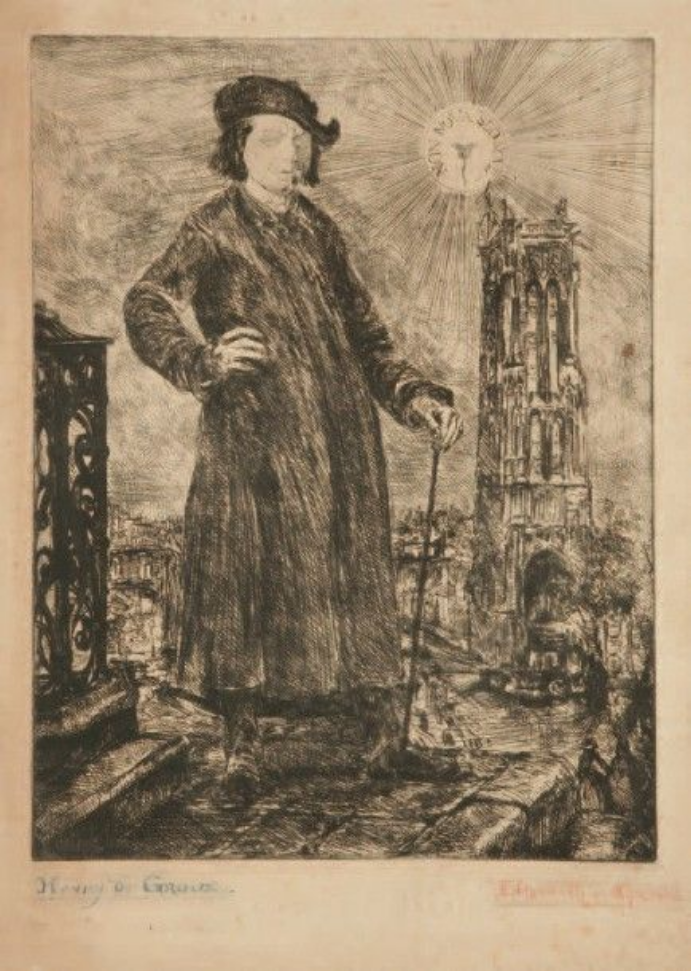
Henry de Groux by his daughter

Groux was born in Boulogne-sur-Mer in 1894, her father was a noted artist. She was Henry de Groux's eldest daughter and Leon Bloy was her godfather.

She married the artist Emile Baumann on 25 July 1931. Her father had just died and her husband wrote a revealing biography of her father.

She died in 1949. When her work is sold it is sold for hundreds of dollars.
