= Émile Baumann =

French writer

- Born: 24 November 1868; Lyon, France
- Died: 24 November 1941 (aged 73); Vernègues, Vichy France
- Occupation: Novelist
- Writing career
- Language: French

Émile Baumann (24 November 1868 – 24 November 1941) was a French writer.

== Biography ==
Baumann was born in Lyon in 1868. He was descended from a Lutheran family converted to Catholicism. In Algiers he met Saint-Saëns, and devoted his first work to him. He was directly involved in the Catholic Literary Renaissance movement, alongside such people as François Mauriac, Paul Claudel and Pierre Reverdy. Sister Mary Keeler, in her Catholic Literary France says that of all French novelists of the time Baumann was perhaps the most completely Catholic. He was awarded the Prix Balzac in 1922 for his novel Job le Prédestiné. In 1931 he married the engraver and artist Elisabeth de Groux, daughter of Belgian painter Henry de Groux.

He died in Vernègues.

== Works ==
- Les Grandes Formes de la Musique, l’œuvre de Camille Saint-Saëns (1905).
- L'Immolé (1909).
- La Fosse aux Lions (1911).
- Trois Villes Saintes: Ars en Dombes, Saint Jacques de Compostelle, Le Mont Saint Michel (1912).
- Le Baptême de Pauline Ardel (1913).
- La Paix du Septième Jour (1917).
- L’Abbé Chevoleau, Caporal au 90e d’Infanterie (1919).
- Le Fer sur l'Enclume (1920).
- Heures d’été au Mont Saint-Michel (1920).
- Job le Prédestiné (1922).
- L’Anneau d’or des Grands Mystiques, de Saint-Augustin à Catherine Emmerich (1924).
- Saint Paul (1925).
- Le Signe sur les Mains (1926).
- Intermèdes (1927).
- Mon Frère Dominicain (1927).
- Les Chartreux (1928).
- Bossuet Moraliste (1929).
- Les Douze Collines (1929).
- Abel et Caïn (1930).
- Marie-Antoinette et Axel Fersen (1931).
- Le Mont Saint-Michel (1932).
- Le Cantique Éternel
  - La Symphonie du Désir (1933).
  - Amour et Sagesse (1934).
- Lyon et le Lyonnais (1934).
- Héloïse, L’Amante et l’Abbesse (1934).
- La Vie Terrible d’Henry de Groux (1936).
- Comment Vivent les Chartreux (1936).
- L'Excommunié (1939).
- Histoire des Pèlerinages de la Sainte Vierge (1941).

Posthumous

- Mémoires (1943).
- Les Nourritures Célestes (1943).
- Shéhérazade (1943).
- Histoire des Pèlerinages de la Chrétienté (1948).
- Pierre Puget, Sculpteur, 1620-1694 (1949).

Articles

- "Toulon et Pierre Puget", La Revue Hebdomadaire, No. 10 (1914).
- "Quand Dieu Parle", La Revue Universelle, No. 15 (1926).
- "Mon frère le Dominicain: Son Enfance et sa Mort", Chroniques, No. 4 (1927).
- "Les Chartreux, les Statuts et le Gouvernement d’un Grand Ordre", La Revue Universelle, (1928).

Works in English translation

- Saint Paul (1929).
- "The Catholic and Supernatural Novel." In: Fiction by its Makers (1928).
