= Henry de Groux =

Belgian Symbolist painter, sculptor and lithographer

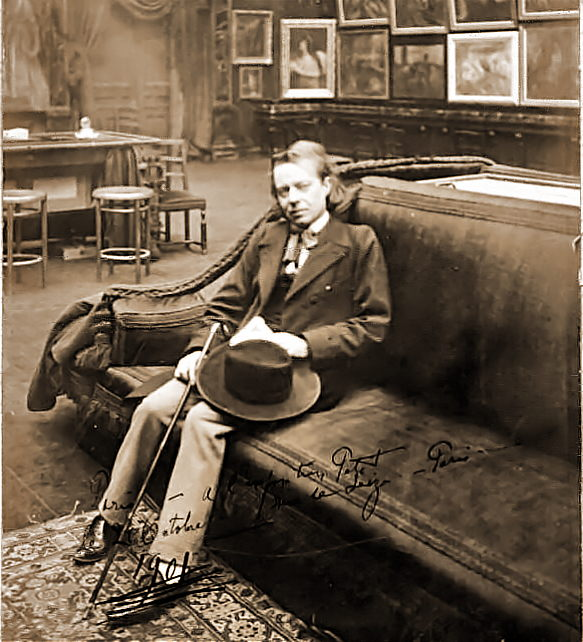
- Henry de Groux.1901
- Born: 15 September 1866; Brussels, Belgium
- Died: 12 January 1930 (aged 63); Saint-Josse-ten-Noode
- Known for: Painting
- Movement: Symbolism

Henry de Groux (15 September 1866 – 12 January 1930) was a Belgian Symbolist painter, sculptor and lithographer. His 1889 painting Christ attacked by a mob made when he was only 22 years old established his reputation as an innovative Symbolist painter and ensured his admission to the progressive artistic circles in Brussels. He spent most of his active career in Paris. He produced many works depicting the horrors of the First World War in the latter part of his career.

== Life ==
De Groux was born in Brussels. He was the son of the painter and engraver Charles de Groux. Like his father, he trained at the Académie Royale des Beaux-Arts in Brussels. Henry was elected a member of Les XX in 1886, but was expelled in 1890 when he refused to have his works displayed in the same gallery as Vincent van Gogh. He shared a studio with the Belgian painter William Degouve de Nuncques for a time in the 1880s.

De Groux subsequently moved to Paris, where he befriended Émile Zola. During the social unrest resulting from the Dreyfus affair, de Groux acted as one of Zola's bodyguards. In Paris he met other artists such as Toulouse-Lautrec, Whistler, Gauguin, Ensor, Rodin and Debussy. He also frequented many writers, including his future son-in-law Émile Baumann, Stéphane Mallarmé, Guillaume Apollinaire, Oscar Wilde, Léon Bloy – with whom he maintained a fusional friendship – Verlaine, Zola, Heredia, Gide, Milosz, Remy de Gourmont and Joris-Karl Huysmans.

Henry de Groux exhibited all over Europe at the salons of Paris, Brussels, Ostend, Spa, Amsterdam, London and Florence. In the latter places he was interned in a psychiatric hospital. He escaped from it and walked all the way to back to Marseille.

He illustrated various literary works. He contributed lithographs to L'Estampe originale (1893) and L'Épreuve (1895).

De Groux had a reputation of a bohemian living a wild and disorderly life. In the preamble of Léon Bloy's book La Femme pauvre (The Poor Woman) de Groux is described as follows: "With the exception of our great painter Henry de Groux, who has descended as deeply as you and as heartily into my black pit?" (La Part Commune Edition, 1897).

His elder daughter Elisabeth de Groux was an engraver. She married Emile Baumann who after his father-in-law's death wrote a revealing biography titled The terrible life of Henry de Groux (1936).

De Groux died in Saint-Josse-ten-Noode on 12 January 1930.

== Work ==
As well as a painter, de Groux was a fervent diarist. Starting from 1892, he produced 18 volumes detailing his life as a European artist in the late 19th and early 20th centuries. In 2002, his descendants donated these volumes to the Institut national d'histoire de l'art; selected excerpts were published in 2007.

Apollinaire wrote of De Groux's exhibition in Paris at the Salon d'Automne 1911, saying the artist's work "...gives one the impression of an immense labor and a sensibility of the highest order..."

== Gallery ==
Paintings

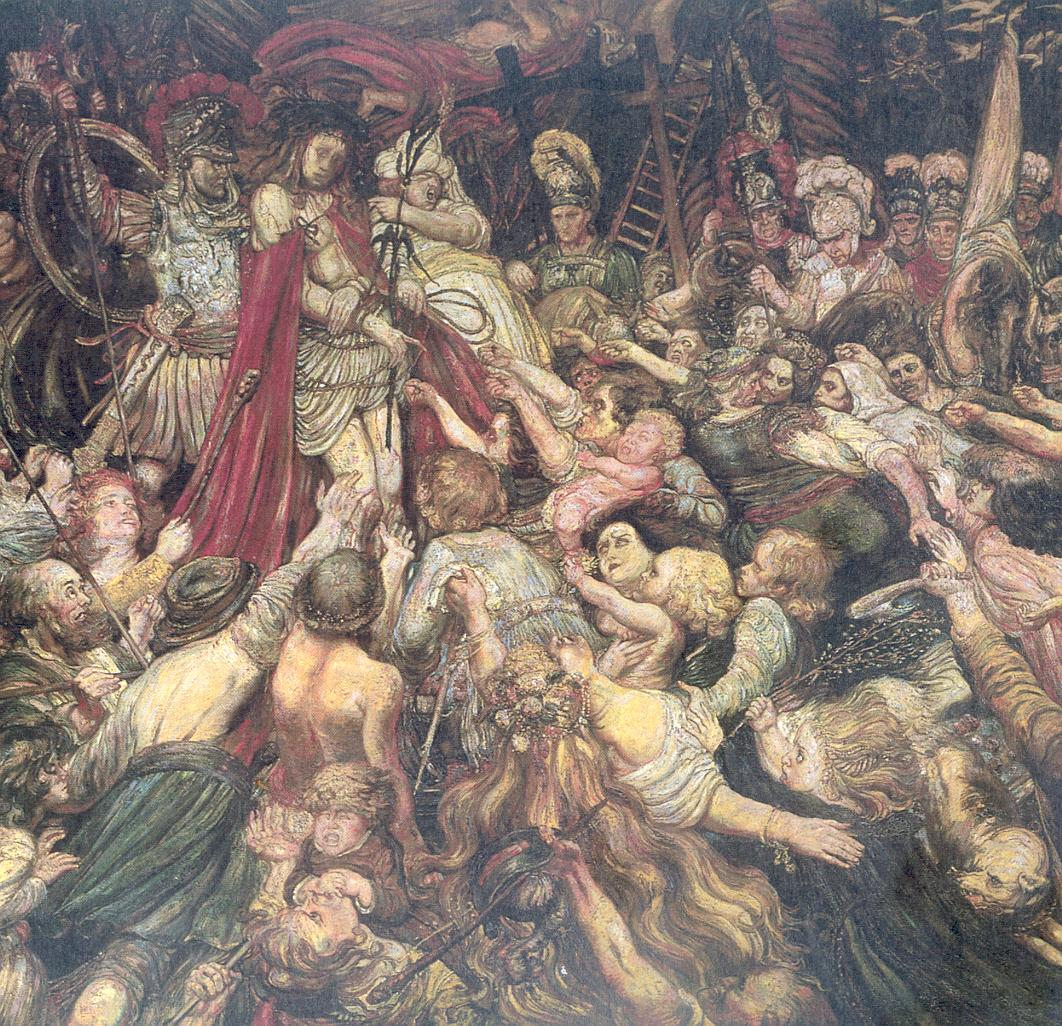
Christ Attacked by a Mob (1889), oil on canvas

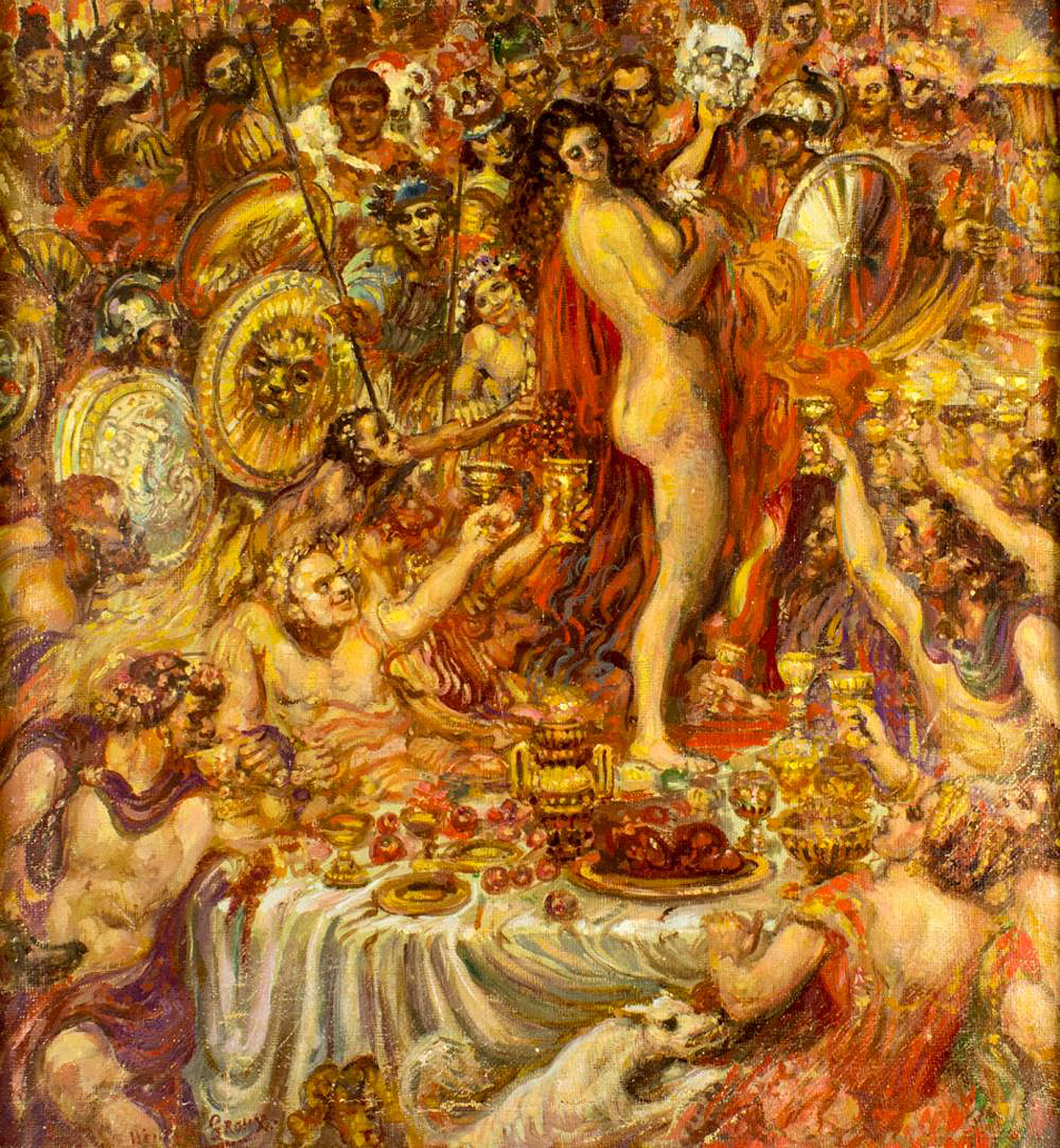
Bacchanal (date unknown), oil on canvas, 90 x 83 cm., private collection

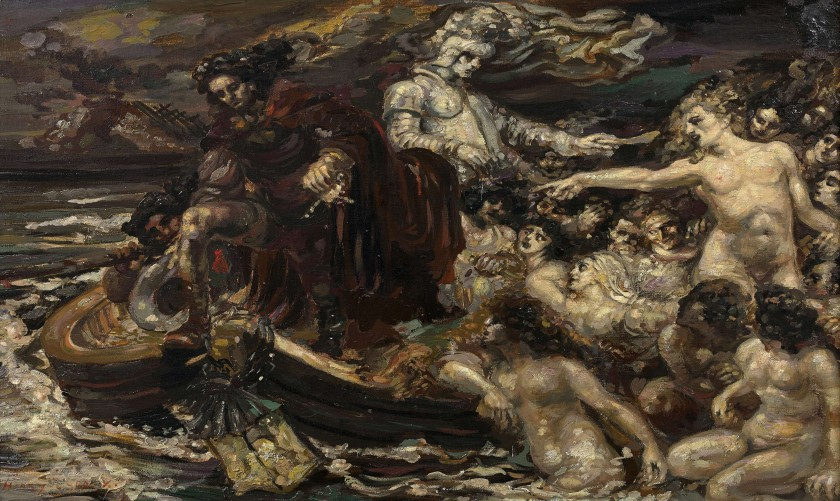
The Barque of Don Juan (date unknown), oil on canvas, 75 x 104 cm., private collection

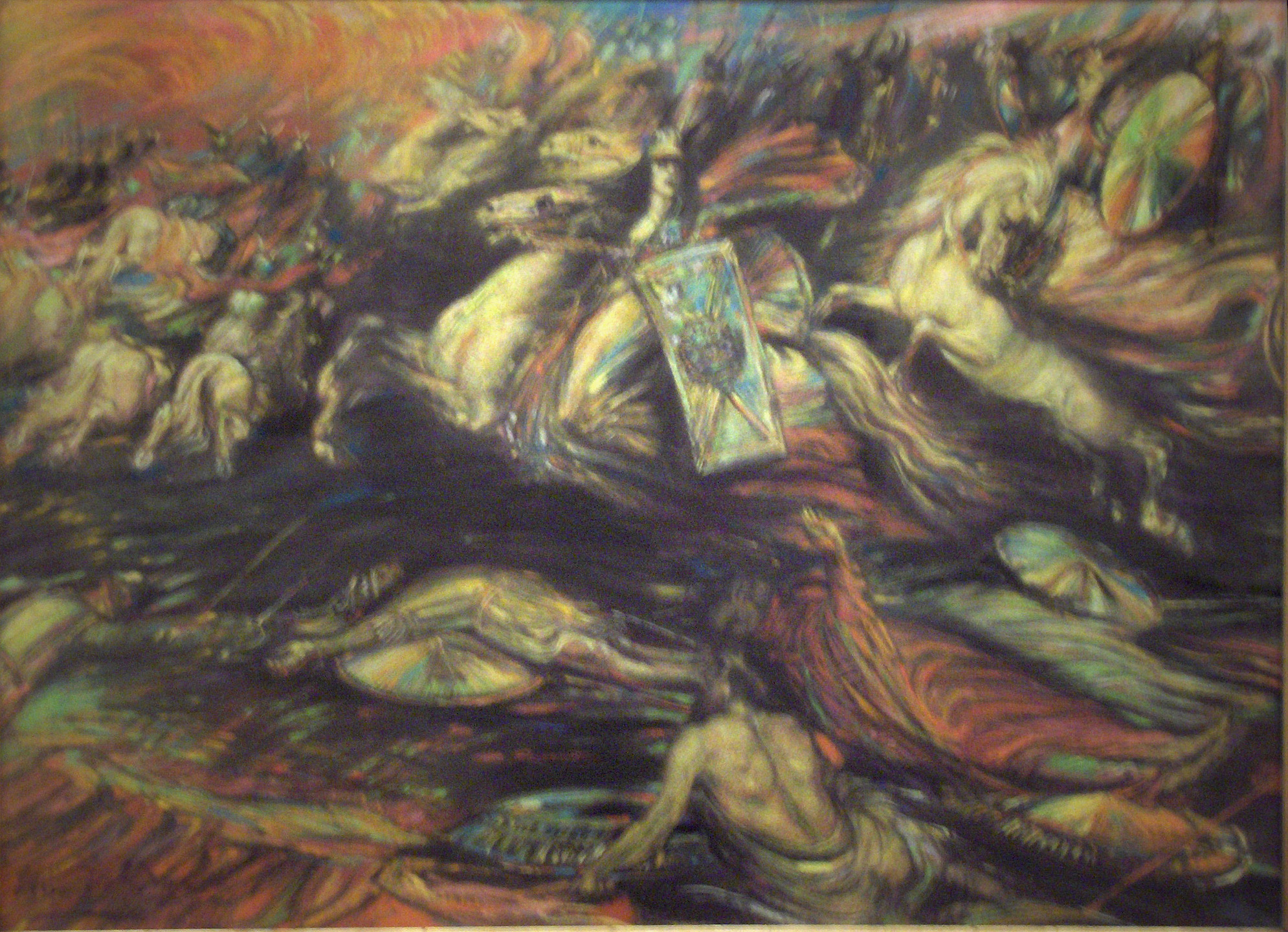
Ride of the Valkyries (ca. 1890), Royal Museums of Fine Arts of Belgium, Brussels

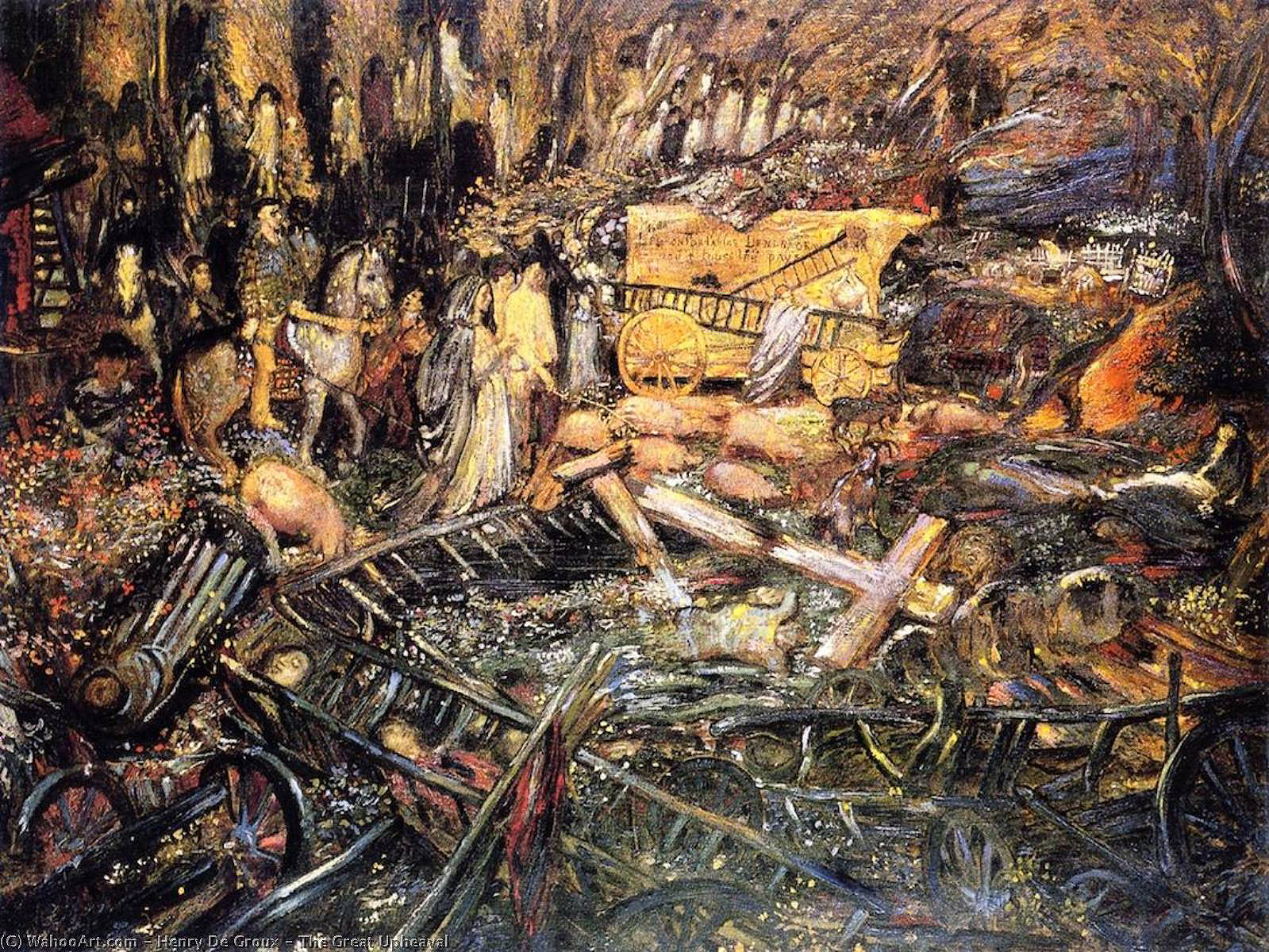
The Great Upheaval (1893), oil on canvas, 76 x 98 cm., private collection

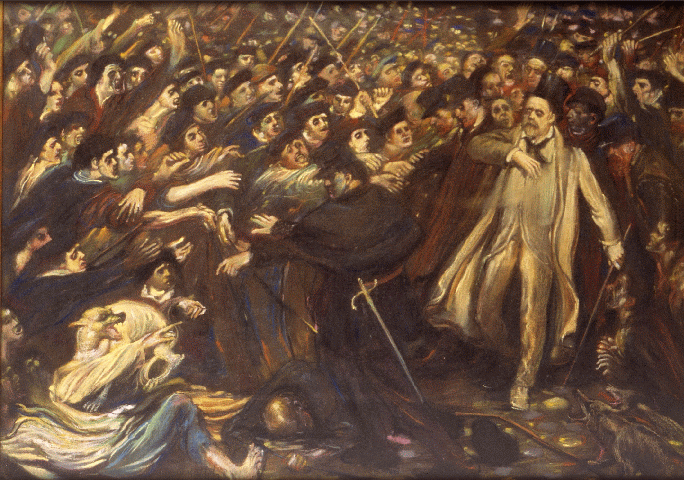
Zola Insulted (1898), oil on canvas, 81 x 109,5 cm., private collection

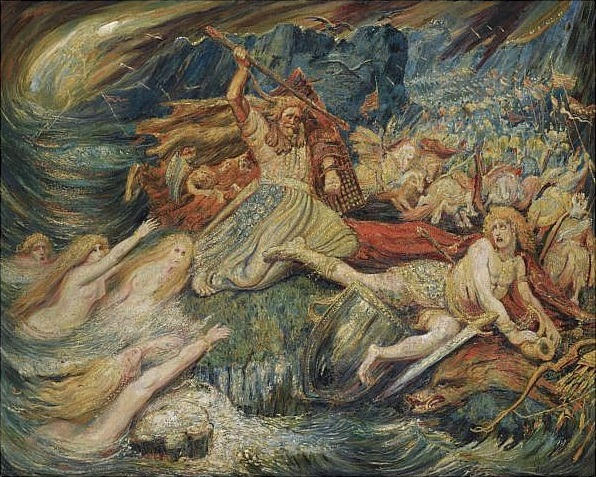
The Death of Siegfried (1899), oil on canvas, 118 x 148 cm., private collection

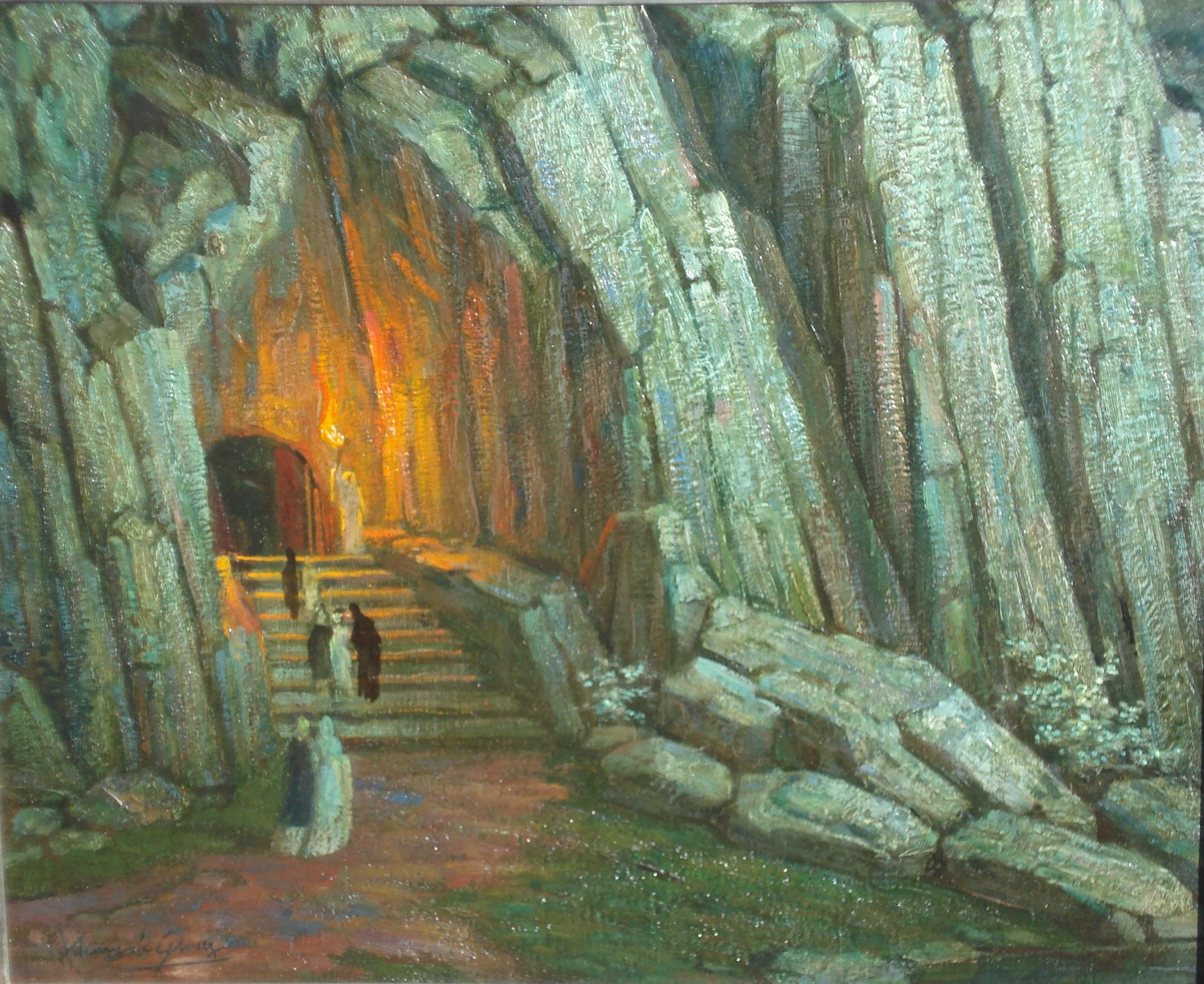
The Grotto (c. 1900)

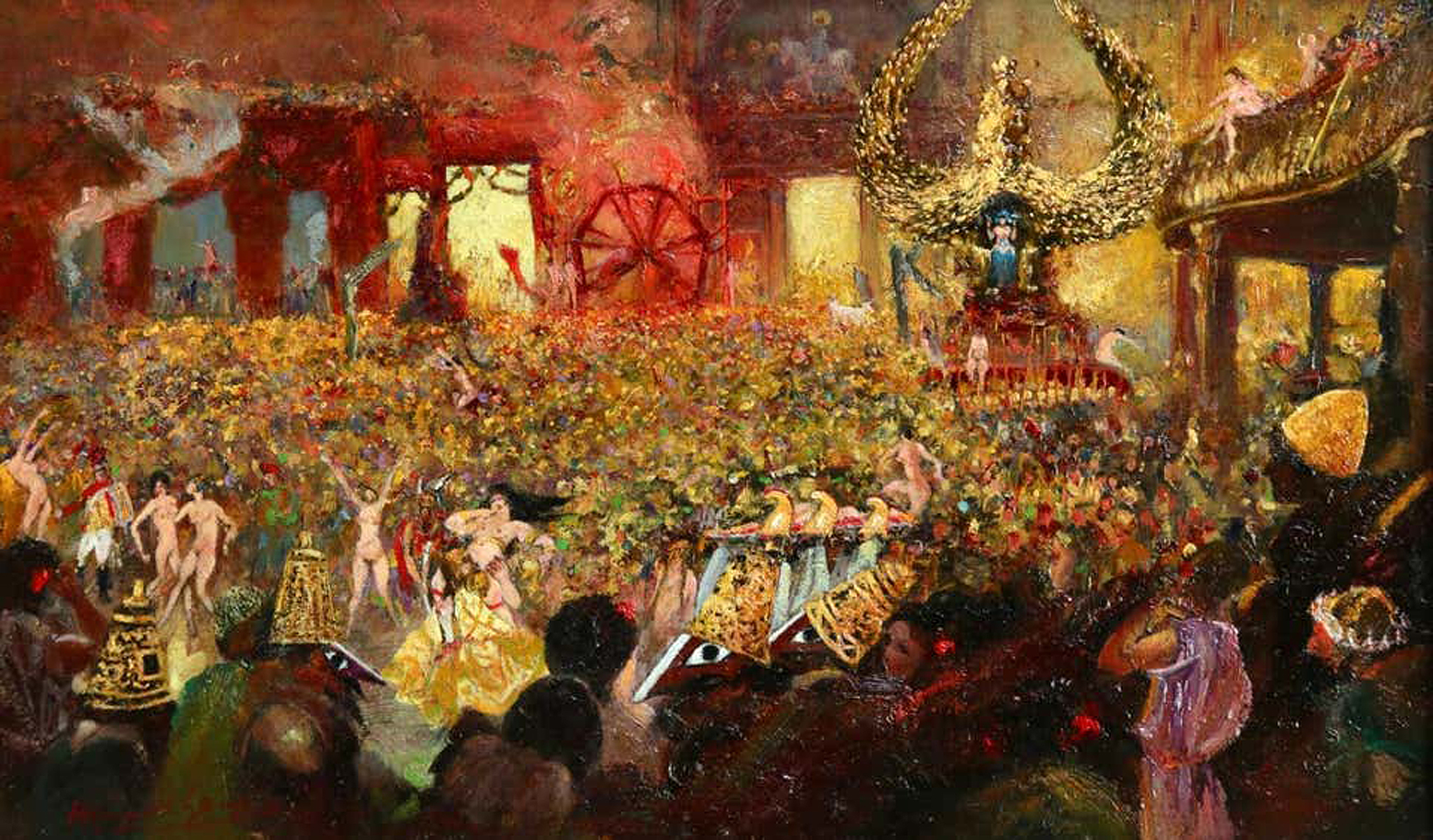
Figures at a Ball (c. 1902), oil on canvas, private collection

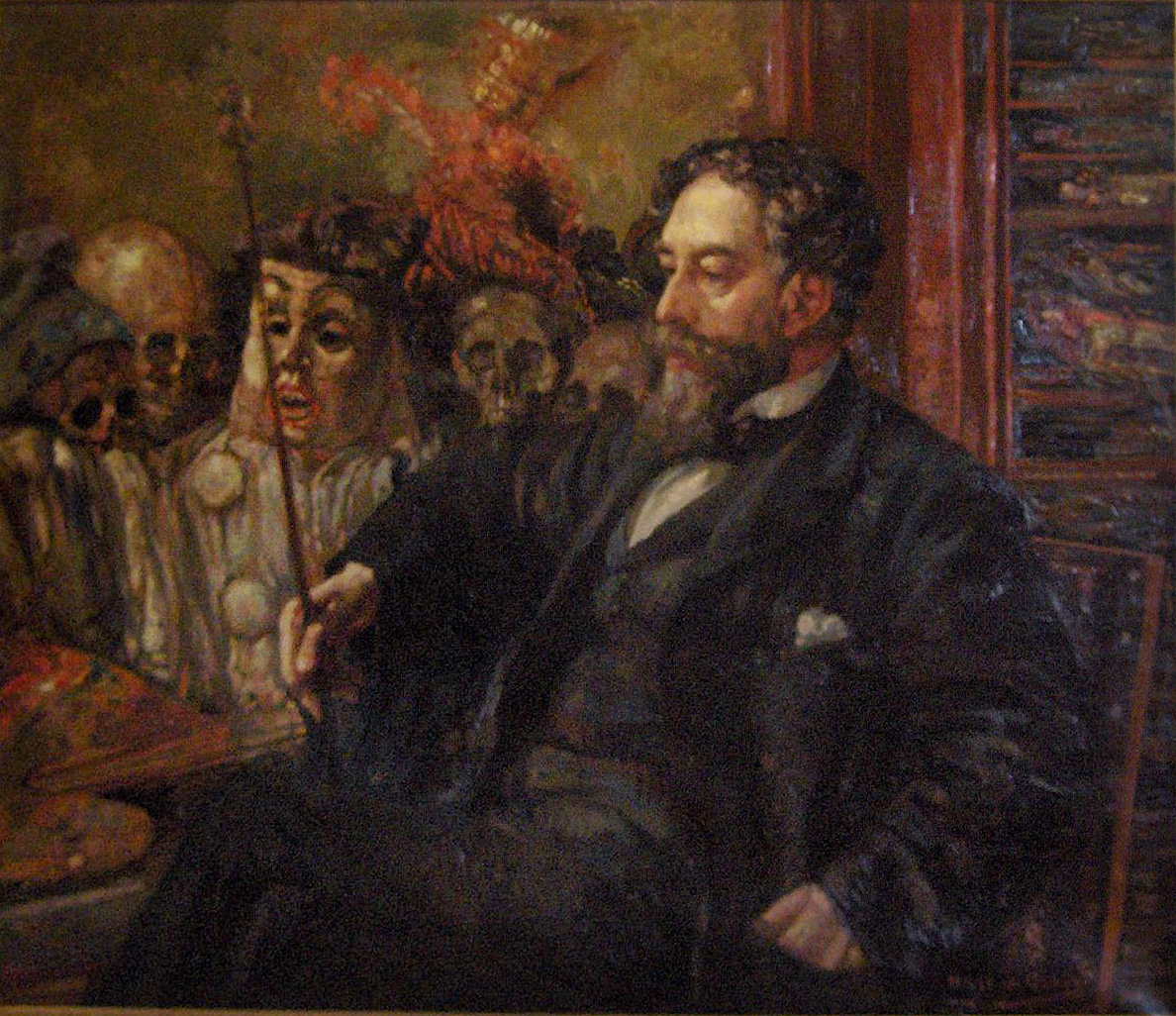
Portrait of James Ensor (1907), oil on canvas, Mu.ZEE, Ostend

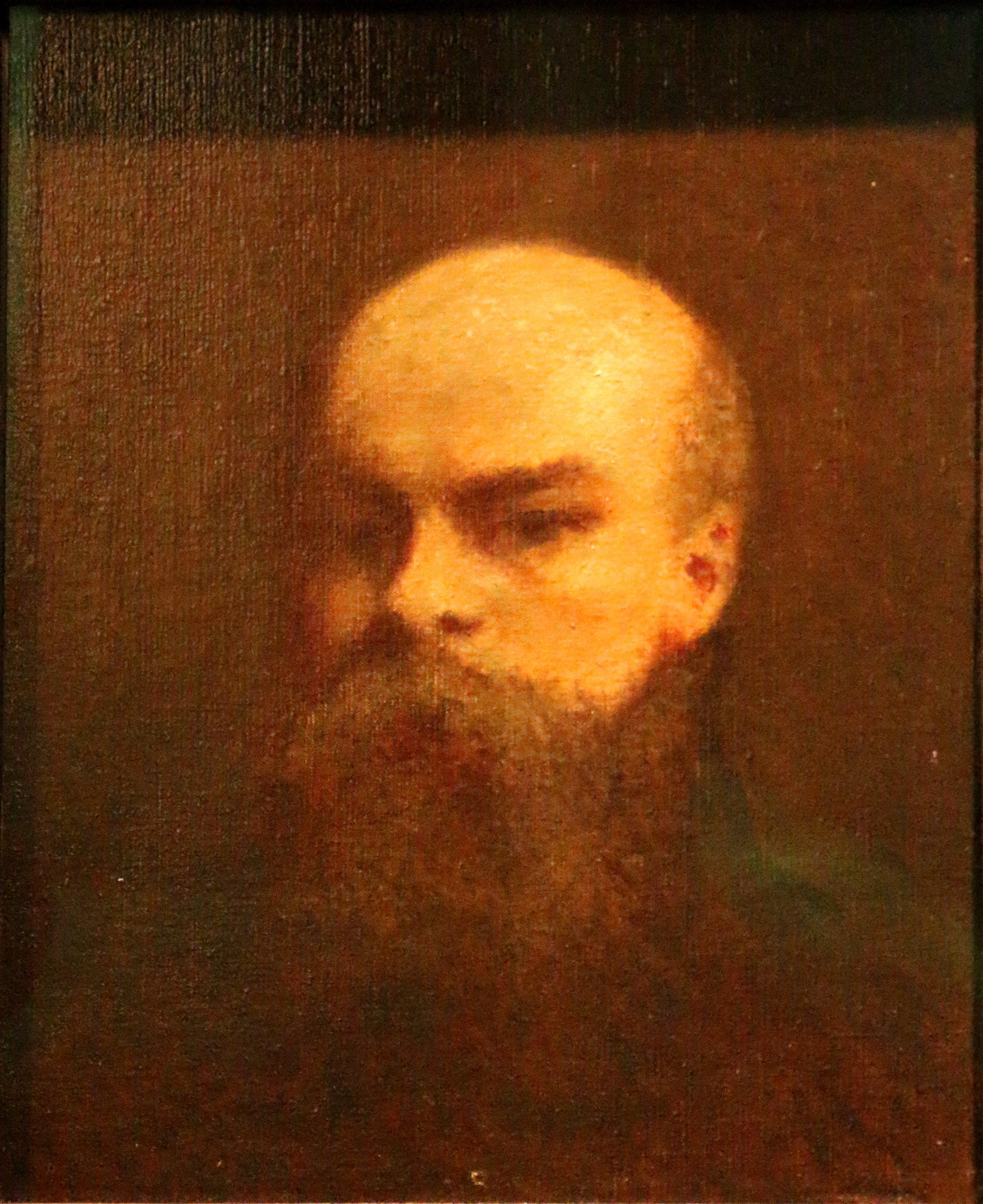
Portrait of Paul Verlaine (date unknown), oil on canvas, 46 x 38 cm., Royal Museums of Fine Arts of Belgium, Brussels

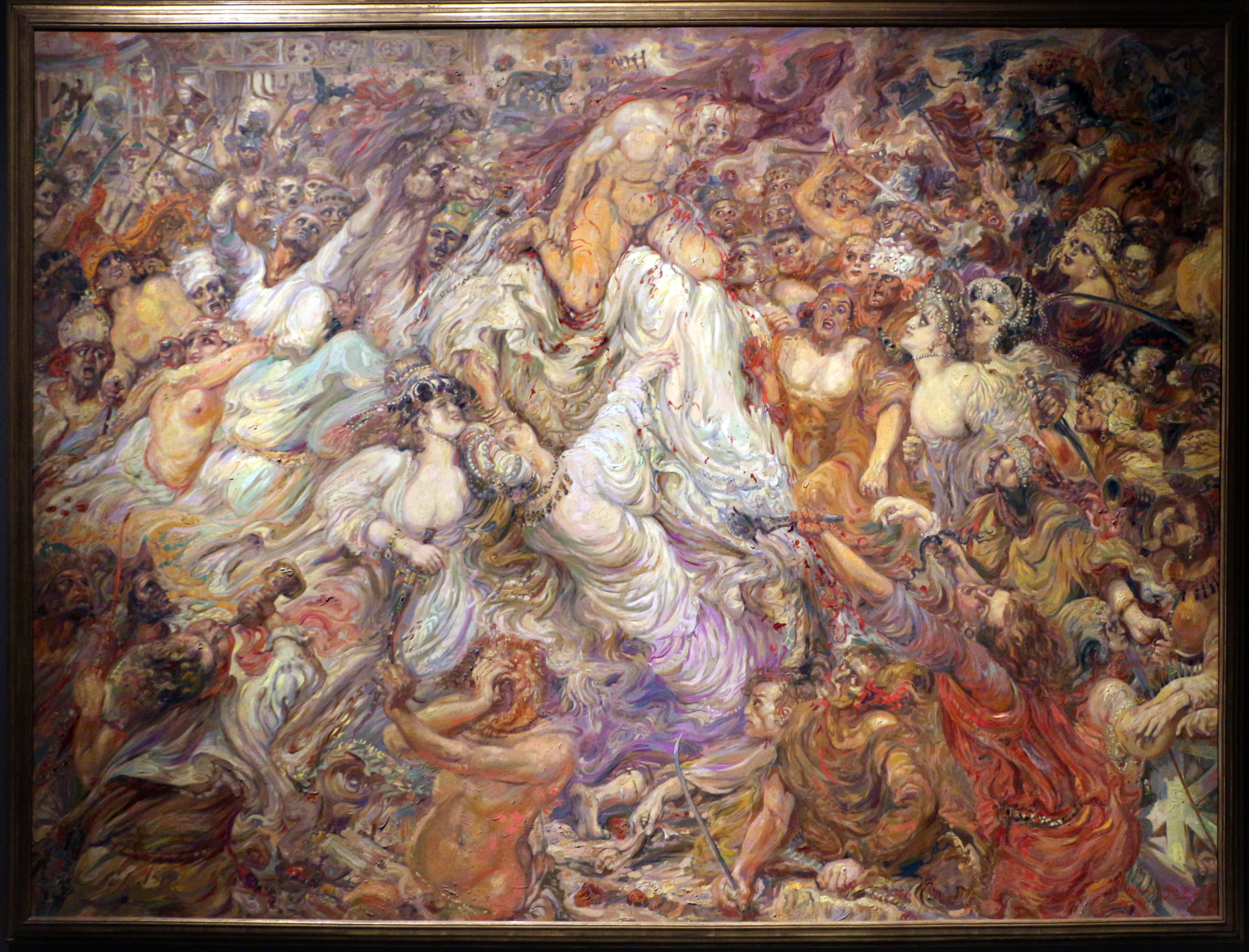
The Death of Andronicus (1926), Fin-de-Siècle Museum (French: Musée Fin-de-Siècle, Brussels

Prints and graphics

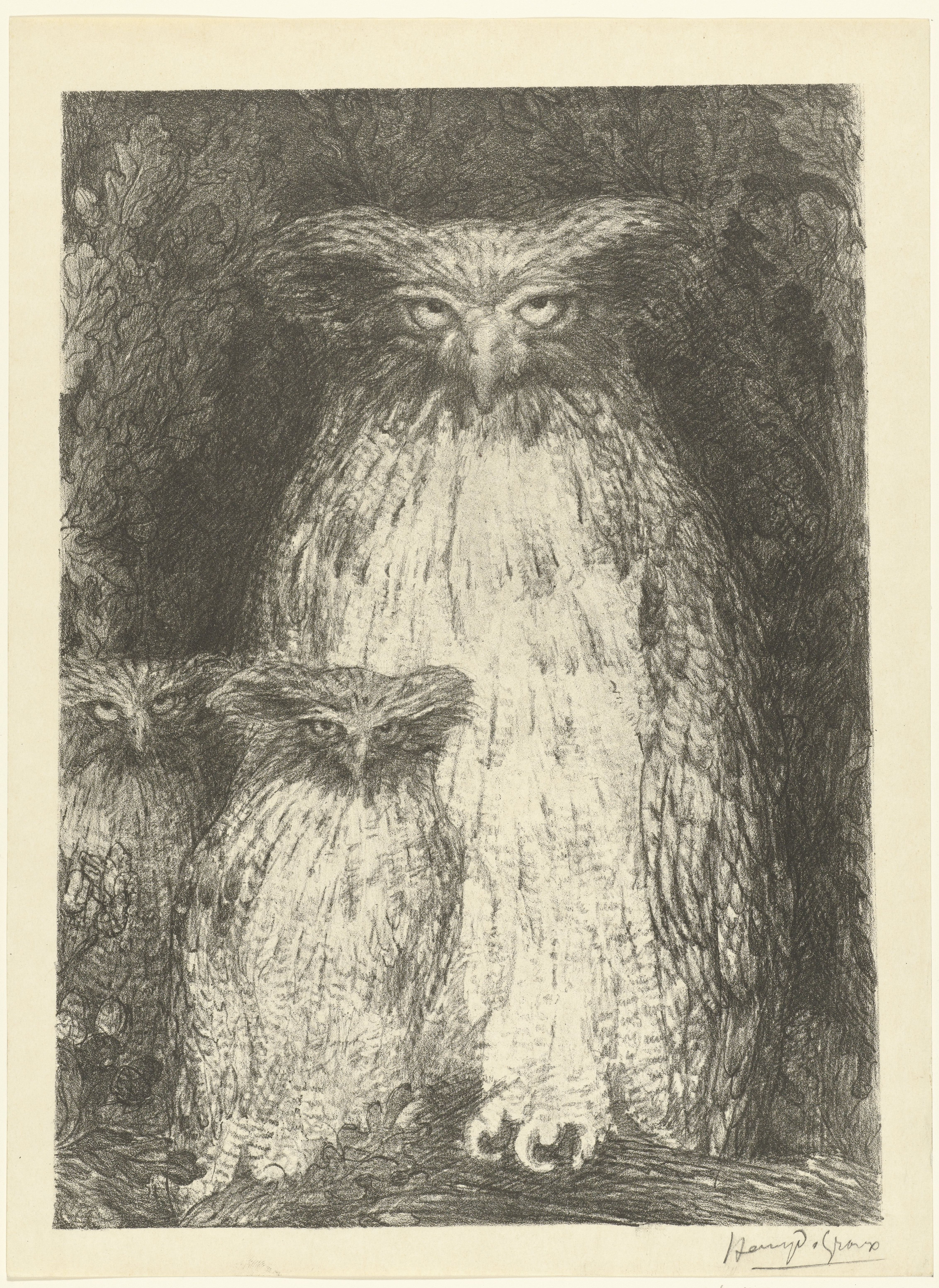
Owl with Two Chicks Sitting on Branch (1893), lithograph, 34.5 x 25 cm.

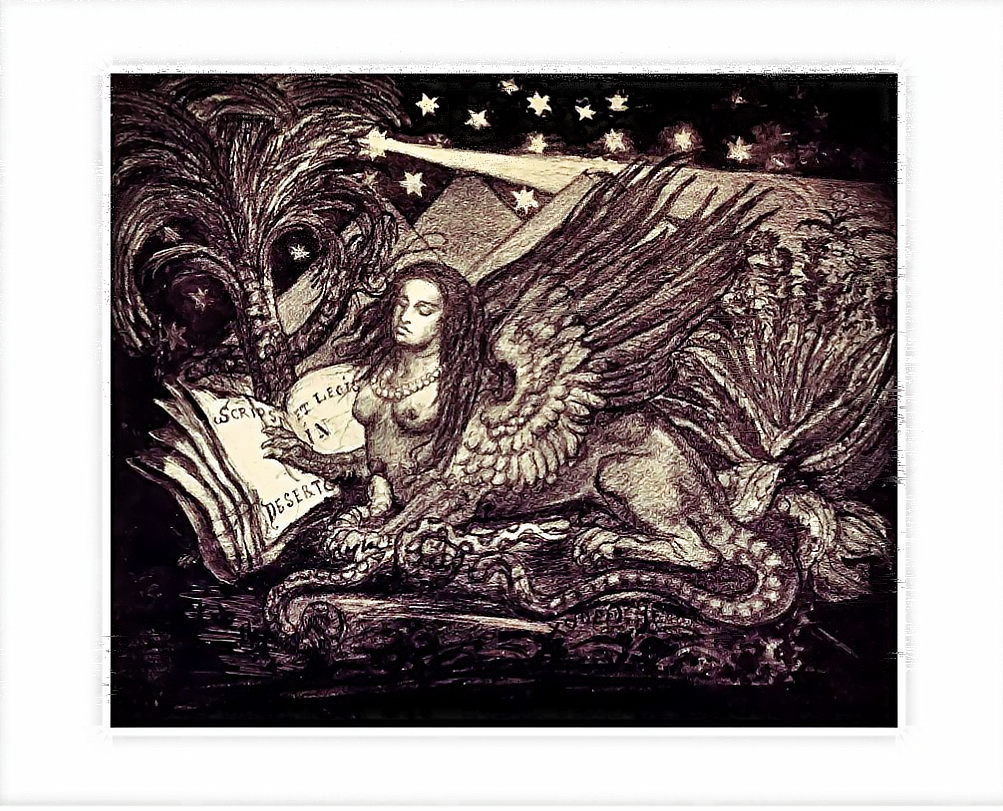
Frontispiece for ‘Hieroglyphs and Other Poems’ (1894) by Remy de Gourmont, 24 x 29 cm. The INHA Library

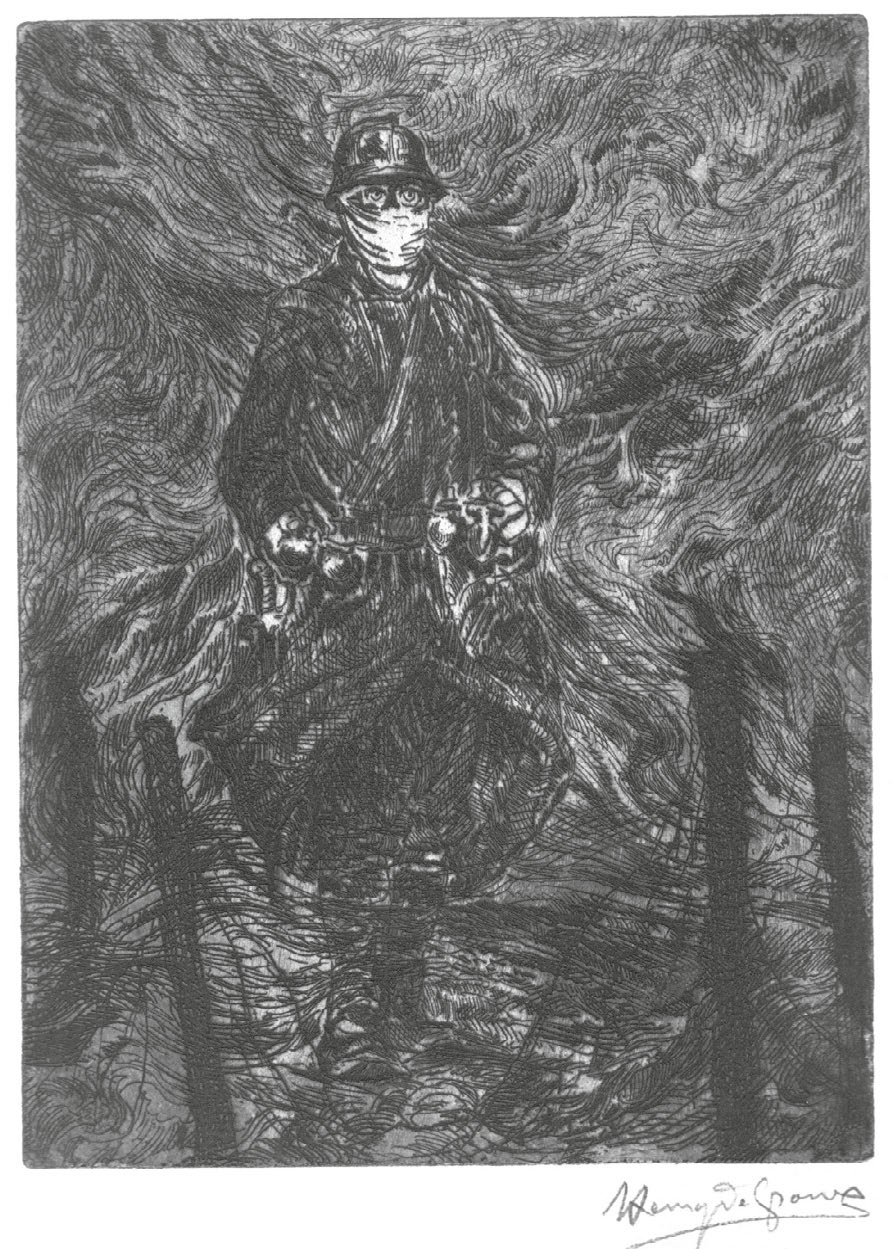
Grenade Launcher (c. 1914–1918)

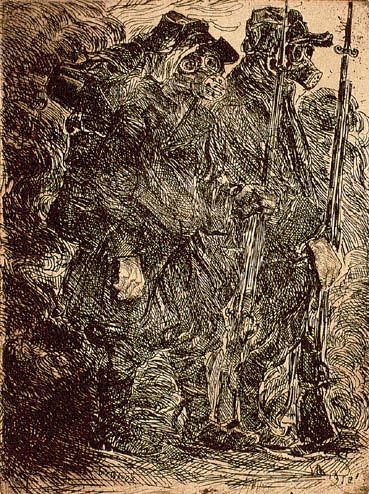
Gas Masks (c. 1914–1918)

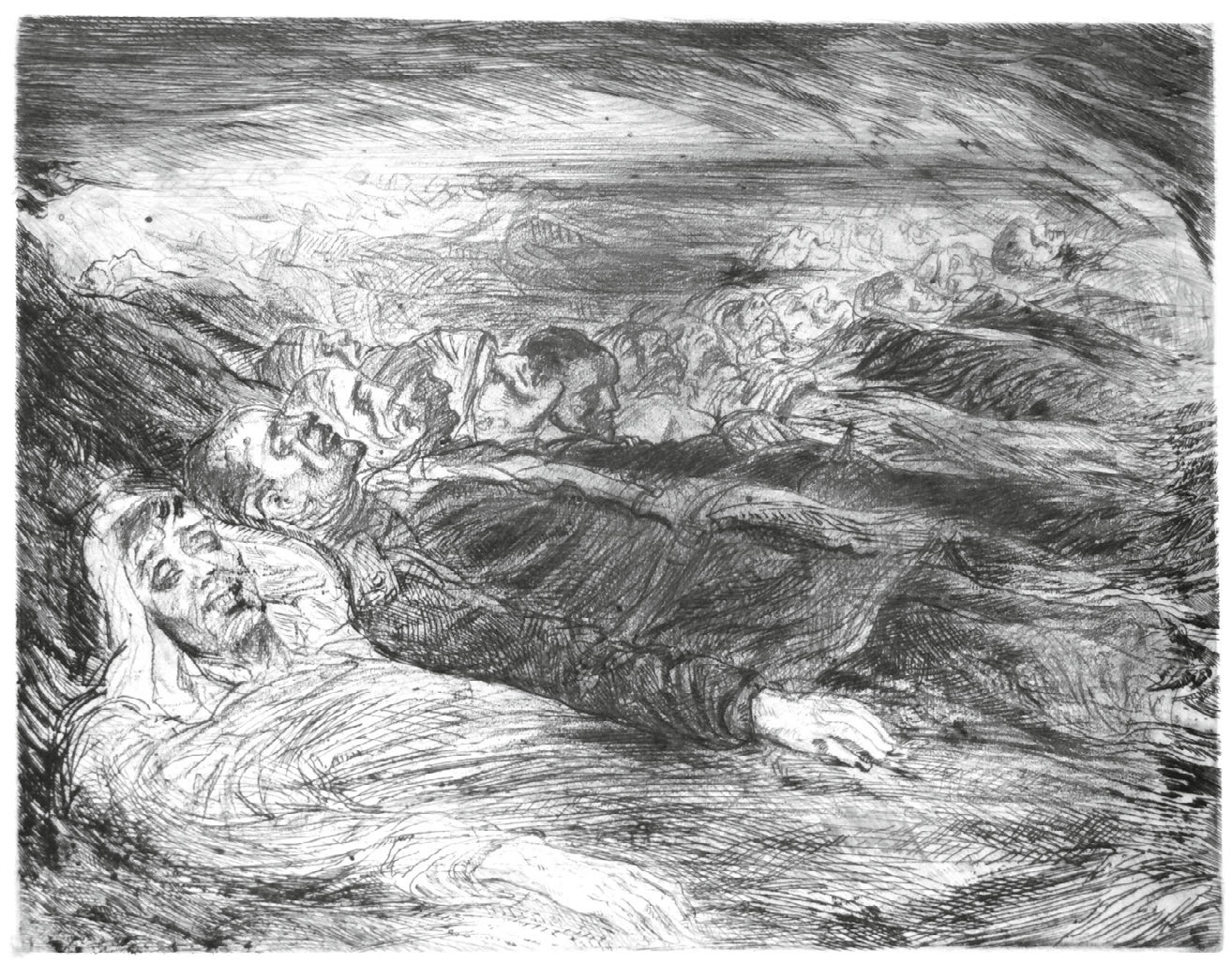
The Massacre (c. 1914–1918), etching and soft-ground etching

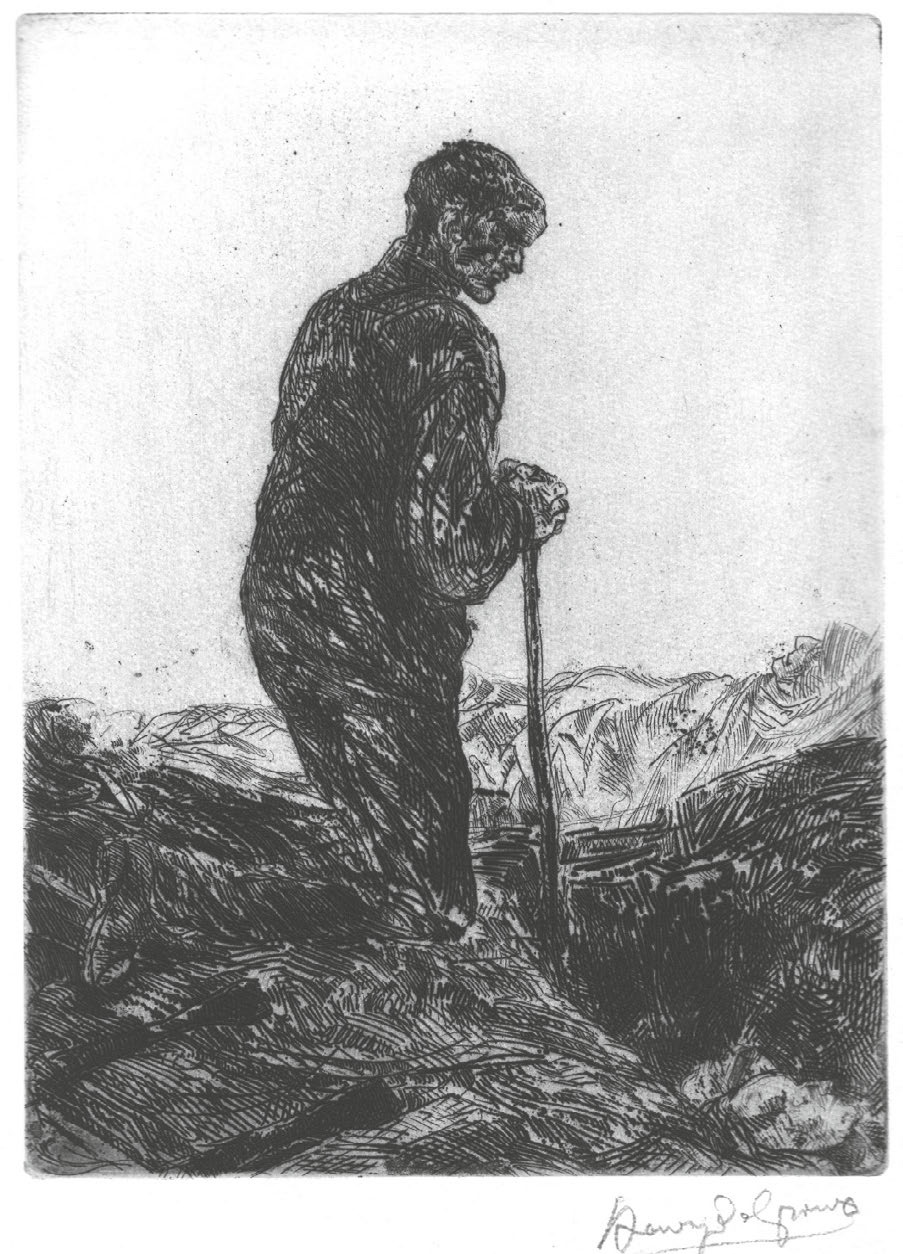
Dies irae (c. 1914–1918)

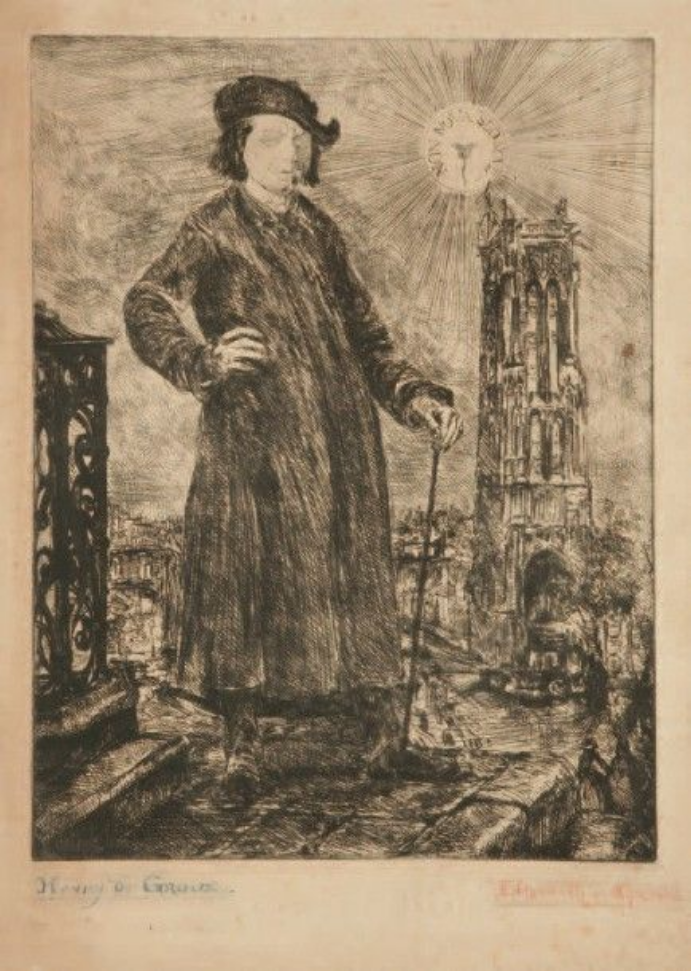
Portrait of Henry de Groux by his daughter Elisabeth
