= René Roubíček =

Czech glass artist

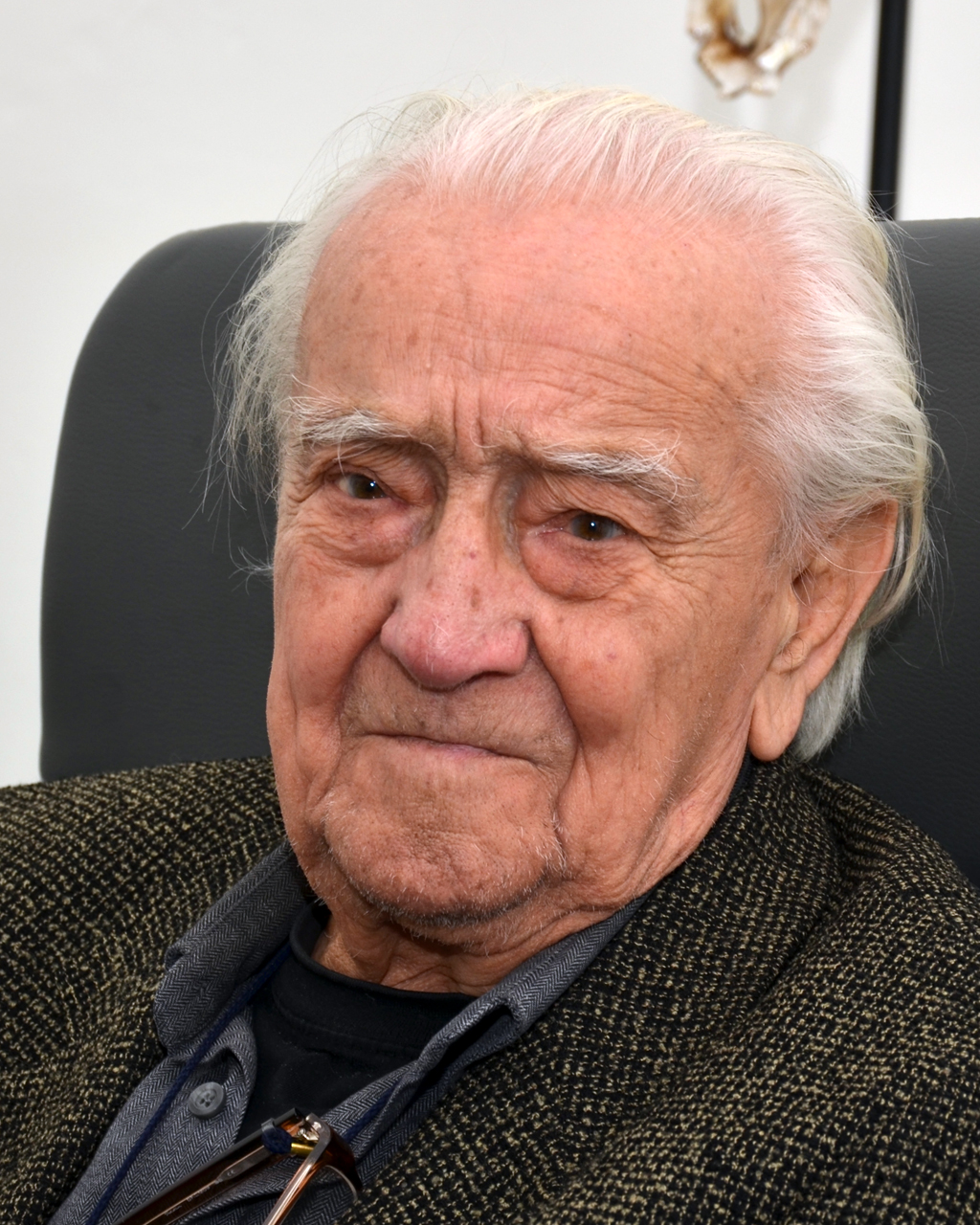
- René Roubíček in 2018
- Born: 23 January 1922; Prague, Czechoslovakia
- Died: 29 April 2018 (aged 96); Prague, Czech Republic
- Education: School of Arts and Crafts in Prague
- Known for: Glass artist and designer, painter, pedagogue

René Roubíček (23 January 1922 – 29 April 2018) was a Czech glass artist, designer, painter, musician and teacher. He was one of the leading figures of 20th century world art glass. As a teacher at the Vocational Glass School in Kamenický Šenov, an artist at the Vocational Glass School in Železný Brod and the head artist of the Borské sklo company, he was at the birth of Czech studio glass.

In the late 1960s he was an external professor at the Academy of Fine Arts in Prague. From 1969 he was a freelance artist and worked with Crystalex, Moser, Lasvit, Preciosa and a number of glassworks. Until the age of 96, he created free sculptures in blown and hand-formed solid, fused and plate glass.

== Life ==
=== 1922–1945 ===
René Roubíček was born on 23 January 1922 in the family of a professional violinist, music teacher and amateur painter Antonín Roubíček. He had an older brother, Antonín, who was also musically gifted and later worked as a laboratory technician in the medical profession and photographer. His mother came from a carpenter's family and took care of the household throughout her life. The household was shared with the Roubíček family by his uncle Jan Tříska, who studied sculpture at the Academy of Fine Arts under Otakar Španiel.

René Roubíček had a visual memory and an ear for music. Together with his brother, he learned to play the piano and later mastered the clarinet, saxophone, guitar, harmonica, bagpipes and electric piano.

He attended the reform primary school where Miloslav Disman (Note: Miloslav Disman was a radio director and dramatist since 1935, founder and choirmaster of the Radio Children's Ensemble and director of children's theatre during the war) taught, and later studied at the Vyšehrad Real Gymnasium, where Jindřich Severa was in charge of art education. He drew since the second grade of primary school. At the age of ten, he exhibited and sold several of his drawings and was even offered a job as a graphic designer in a Prague company, where they had no idea that he was a young boy. At the age of 14, he exhibited his copy of Václav Brožík's painting Celebration at Rubens with 52 figures, painted after a reproduction, at a show of amateur painters. Several newspaper articles have been published about his talent. He was also noticed by the then rector of the Academy of Fine Arts in Prague Max Švabinský who invited his parents and offered René to study at the Academy after finishing school.

Universities were closed during the war. Therefore, on the recommendation of Jindřich Severa, he began his studies at the Art and Crafts School (UMPRUM), which was then serving as the main art school. He was admitted to the studio of monumental painting and glass led by prof. Jaroslav Václav Holeček, who came to the Art and Crafts School after the occupation of the Sudetenland from the School of Glass in Nový Bor. In Holeček's studio, Věra Lišková, Stanislav Libenský, Josef Hospodka, Felix Průša, or Miluše Kytková were his classmates. During his studies, Roubíček dealt mainly with engraved, cut, etched and sandblasted glass. He finished his studies in 1944 and in 1945 became a member of the Revolutionary Guard and of the Union of Czech Youth.

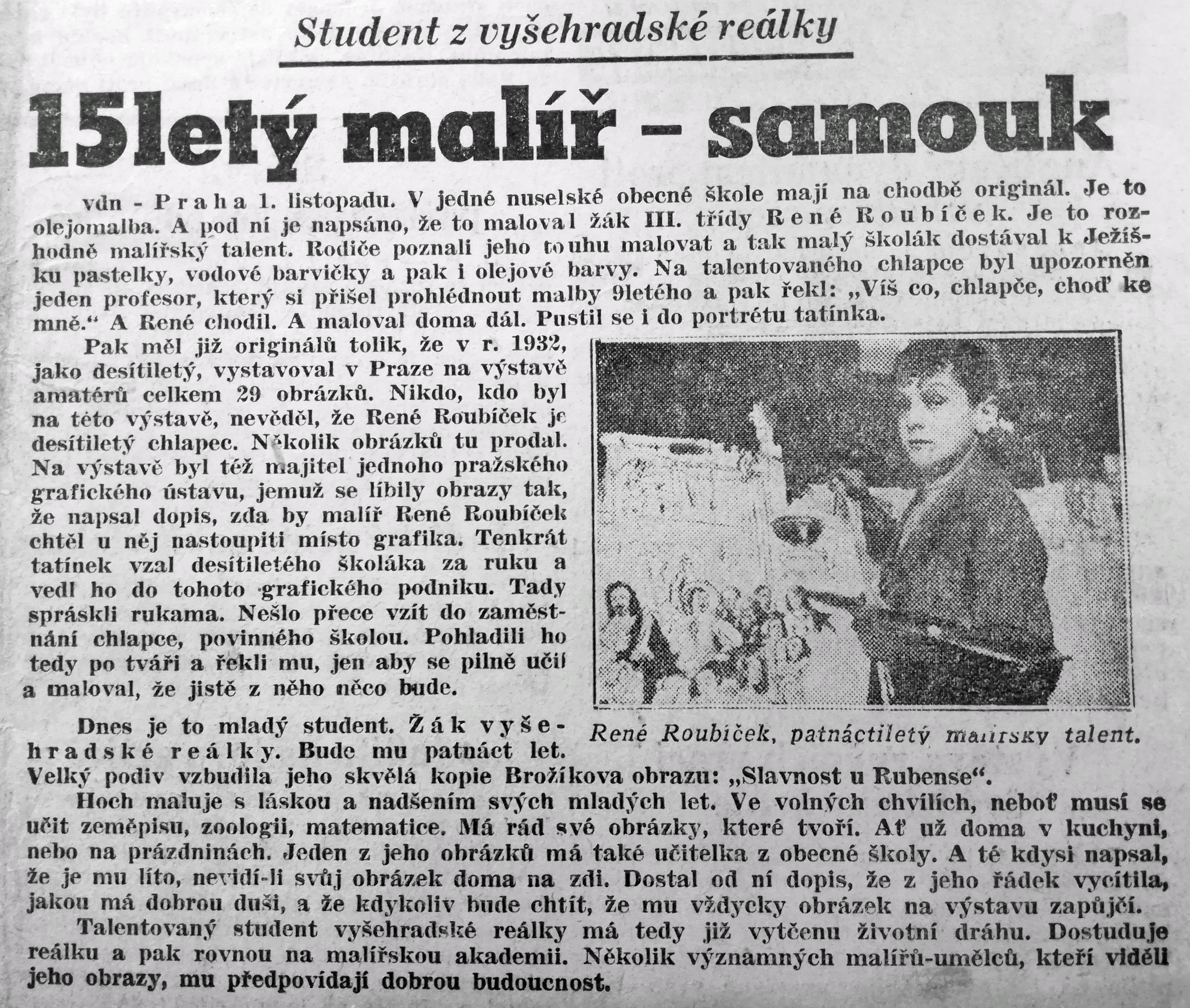
Fifteen-year-old talented painter René Roubíček

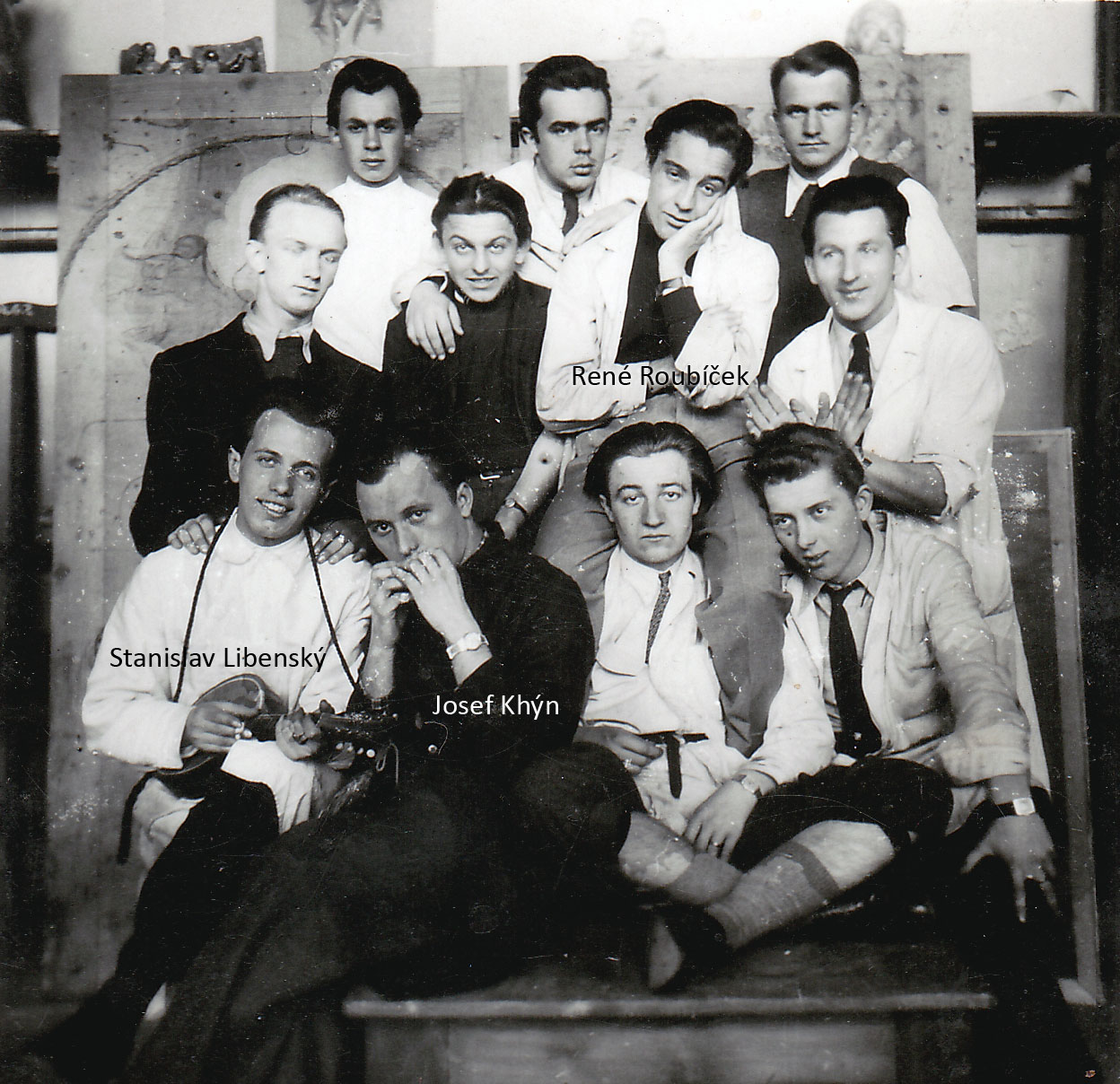
Roubíčes's classmates at UMPRUM

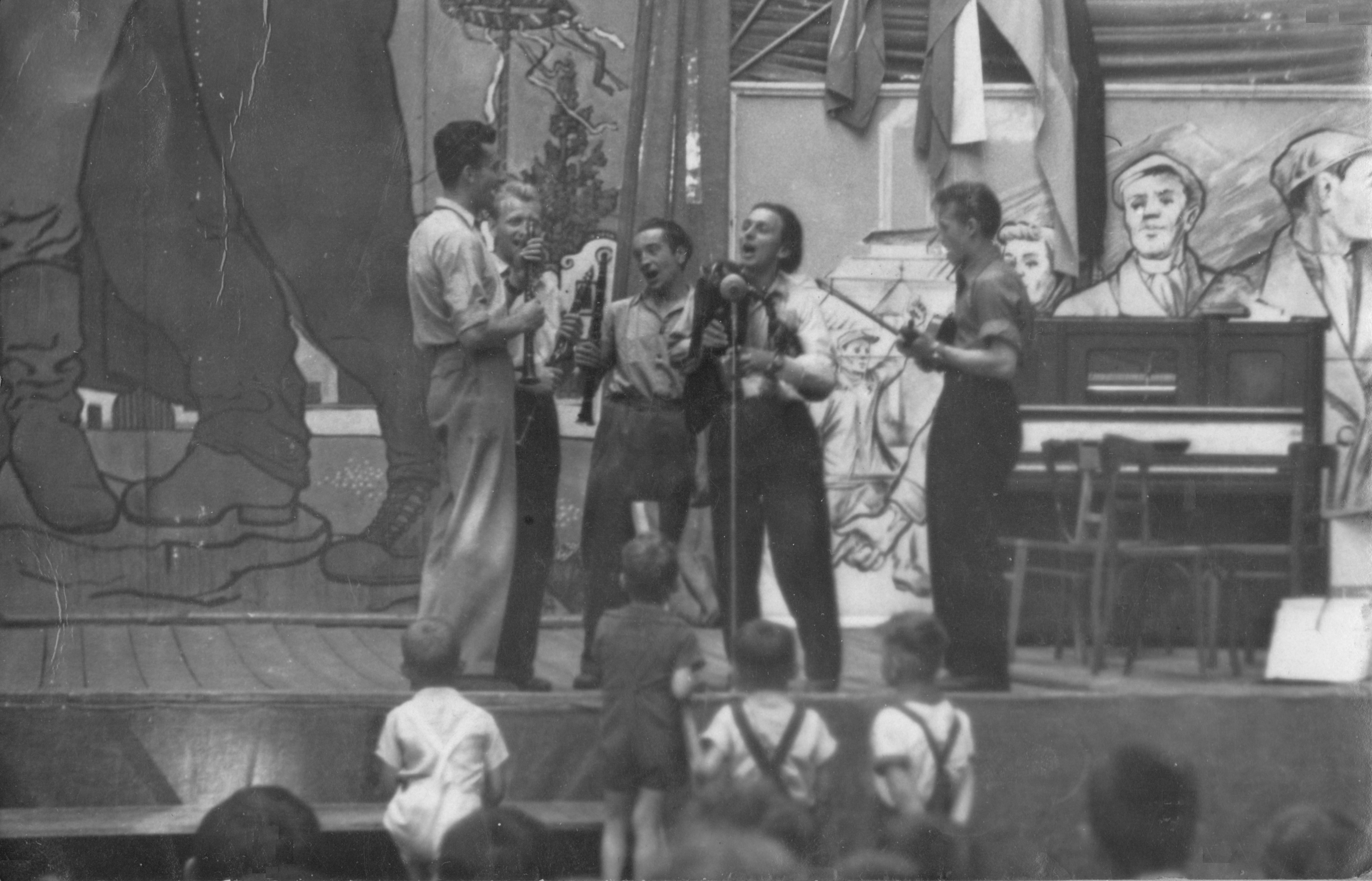
Streichkapelleglasswerke, UMPRUM 1940–1944. René Roubíček with clarinet, 3rd from the left

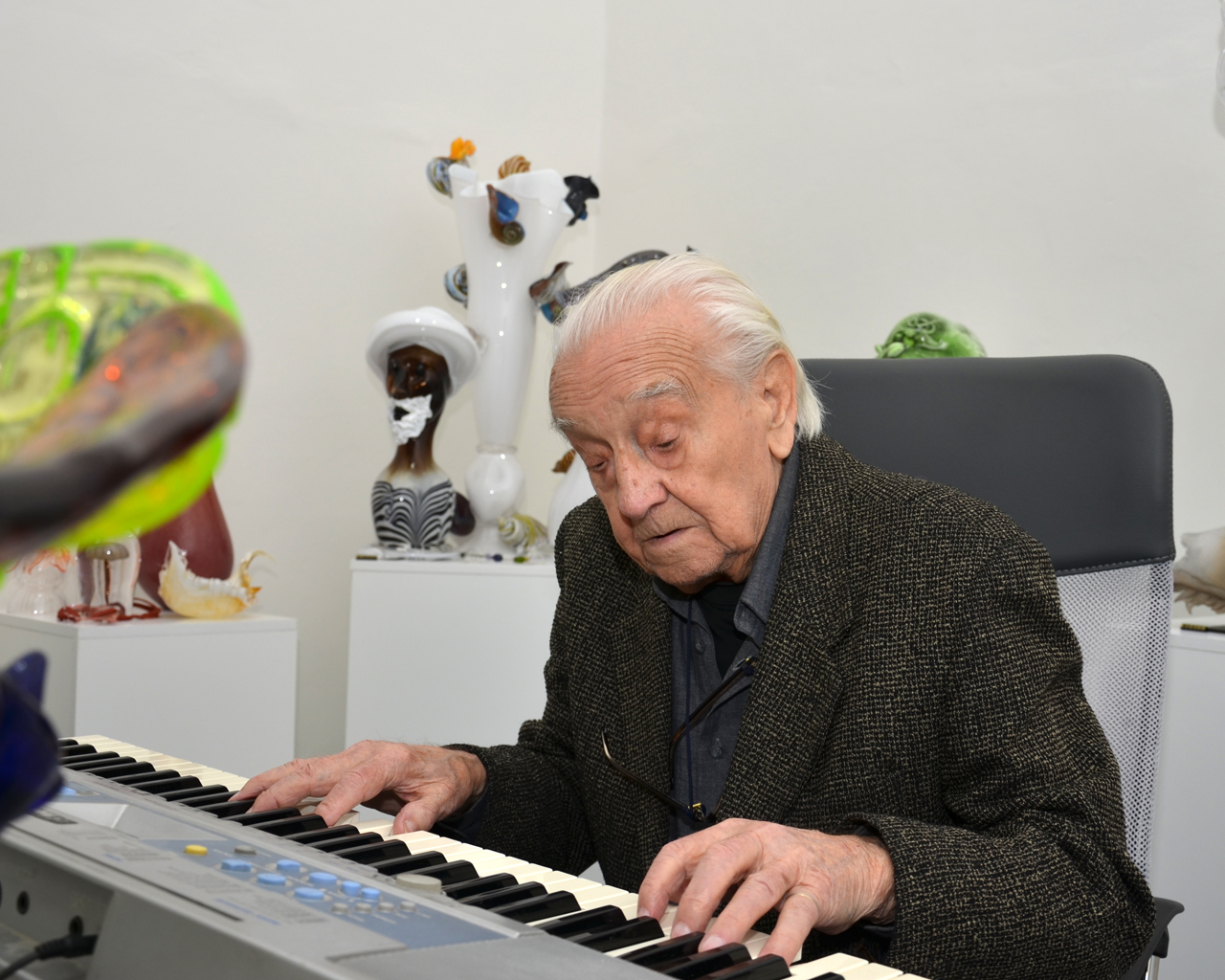
René Roubíček, aged 96, plays the piano at Jiří Pačinek's Tripartit Gallery (2018)

=== 1945–1958 ===
After the war, together with Stanislav Libenský and Josef Michal Hospodka, he went to northern Bohemia to substitute the displaced German glassmakers in the glass schools in Nový Bor and Kamenický Šenov and to maintain teaching. Roubíček's pupils in Kamenický Šenov came from the same generation (Vladimír Kopecký, Vladimír Jelínek, etc.) and felt as a family. They were inspired by the visual style represented by the Družstevní práce publishing house at the time, especially functionalism, by arch. Otto Rothmayer, Josef Sudek or Ladislav Sutnar, and very quickly adopted a modern view of glass. René Roubíček headed the department of engraved and cut glass, but he was the first to deal with the artistic qualities of hot hand-formed glass. He was an inspiring teacher and a capable organizer, and therefore, less than a year after the resumption of teaching, students were able to present their results at an exhibition on the 90th anniversary of the school. Subsequently, they transferred the exhibition to the Družstevní práce shop in Prague and founded the Alumni Production Cooperative, but after the communist takeover in 1948 they were forced to enlist in the army and later it was no longer possible to restore the cooperative. Small-scale production was forcibly suppressed at that time in favour of large national enterprises and heavy industry.

In 1949–1950, René Roubíček completed his studies at the Academy of Arts and Crafts in Prague in the glass studio of Prof. Josef Kaplický with a final thesis and a state examination. Until 1952 he continued as a teacher and artist of the Design centre of cut glass at the Glass School in Kamenický Šenov. The school was closed down in 1952 by decision of the communist authorities. René Roubíček has moved to "Umělecké sklo" (Art Glass) national enterprise in Nový Bor, where he was the chief artist until 1965 and designed applied and decorative glassware for mass production. The Nový Bor glassworks had the longest glassmaking tradition and the widest range of glassmaking techniques and technologies, and a background of experienced professionals. René Roubíček, together with master glassmaker Josef Rozinek, created his first original works of blown and hand-shaped glass there and raised glass art to the level of other artistic disciplines. He is the author of the statement "Glass is the art of today".

Karel Jindra, the former owner of the glassworks in Prácheň, who later became the director, or the theoretician Karel Hetteš, who was dismissed from the Museum of Decorative Arts in Prague, also worked in the "Umělecké sklo (Art Glass)". The latter was officially employed as a worker in the courtyard squad, but in reality he organized exhibitions and important commissions. The glass studios designed for mass production, but apart from that, unique works were created here, such as state gifts, trophies for athletes, stained glass windows or custom-made prosthetic eyes. In 1953 another merger took place and Umělecké sklo was incorporated into the company Borské sklo together with the glassworks in Harrachov and Nový Bor. During the preparation of the World Exhibition Expo 58, glass artists were for the first time given the opportunity of completely free creation.

=== 1958–1970 ===
René Roubíček also worked at the Design centre of the glass school in Železný Brod and collaborated externally with the Central Art Centre for the Glass and Fine Ceramics Industry and later with the Institute of Housing and Clothing Culture (ÚBOK) in Prague. In 1958 he was a founding member of the creative group Bilance, whose theoretician was Karel Hetteš. Since 1961 he was a member of Umělecká beseda.

In 1966, he left his position at Borské sklo when the company was unable to ensure the production of modern designs created in the studios. In 1966–1968, at the invitation of the rector Jiří Kotalík, who was presenting modern Czech art abroad as a curator, he became an external lecturer at the Academy of Fine Arts in Prague, but did not have time to establish a glass studio. After the Soviet occupation in 1968 and the return of the rigid communist regime, he resigned from the Communist Party of Czechoslovakia and decided to become a freelance artist in 1969. In the 1970s he was placed on the unofficial list of politically undesirable artists and lost the possibility to exhibit independently in Czechoslovakia.

=== 1970–2018 ===
In the 1970s he collaborated with the Beránek glassworks (ÚLUV since 1952) in Škrdlovice, with glassmaker Josef Rozinek and the Crystalex glassworks in Nový Bor (formerly Borské sklo), then with Petr Novotný (Crystalex, Ajeto in Lindava), Moser in Karlovy Vary and with the Swiss glassworks Glasi Hergiswil. Exports abroad were mediated during normalization by the enterprise Artcentrum, established to obtain foreign currency for the state. In later years, he created glass in collaboration with Jiří Pačinek (PAČINEK GLASS in Kunratice u Cvikova) and metal sculptures in collaboration with Ivo Šimánek.

Since 1982 René Roubíček has been one of the main organizers of the International Glass Symposia (IGS) in Nový Bor. In 2015, René Roubíček and Miluše Roubíčková were the first to be elected into the IGS Glass Hall of Fame. In addition to IGS Nový Bor, where he has participated eleven times since 1982, René Roubíček has participated in the International Symposium of Engraved Glass in Kamenický Šenov and glass symposia in Frauenau (1982), Lucerne (1983, 1984), Immenhausen (1985) and Glavunion in Teplice (1995). In 1994 he lectured at the Pilchuck Glass Summer School in Seattle (USA), in 1998 he made a lecture tour of Japan, and in 2006 he participated in the Visiting Artist Program at the Museum of Glass in Tacoma, Washington. He has had more than 50 solo exhibitions on virtually every continent.

While studying at the School of Arts and Crafts, René Roubíček met Miluše Kytková, who originally wanted to study at the Faculty of Arts (closed during the war) and married her in 1948. Miluše Roubíčková was also an important glass artist. In 1966, René Roubíček became a guardian of the designer Bořek Šípek, who was orphaned at the age of 16. Šípek lived with his sister until 1968 and emigrated to Germany after the Warsaw Pact invasion of Czechoslovakia.

René Roubíček lived and worked alternately in Kamenický Šenov and Prague. In Kamenický Šenov, the Roubíček couple bought a house with a garden where they installed their works. In 1995, René Roubíček had a glass gallery built here according to his own design. A company that included teachers and theoreticians of glass art as well as glass artists, painters and sculptors used to meet at their house.

Roubíček died on 29 April 2018 in Prague, at the age of 96.

=== Awards ===
- 1958 Grand Prix, Expo 58, Brussels
- 1967 Czechoslovak State Prize
- 1969 Bayerischer Staatspreis – Goldenmedaille, Internationale Handwerksmesse, Munich
- 1970 Silvermedaille, Internationale Handwerksmesse, Exempla '70, Munich
- 1977 Coburger Glaspreis, Coburg, Urkunde
- 1980 Zentralschweizer Glaspreis, Luzern (1st prize)
- 1985 Ehrenpreis, Zweiter Coburger Glaspreis, Coburg
- 1997 Prize of the Masaryk Academy of Arts
- 2006 Glass Prize, Czech Glass Society
- 2007 Czech Grand Design Hall of Fame, Academy of Design of the Czech Republic
- 2008 Bayerische Staatspreis
- 2012 Honorary Citizen of Kamenický Šenov
- 2014 Special Jury Prize, Coburger Glaspreis, Coburg
- 2015 Award of the Governor of the Liberec Region
- 2015 Hall of Fame, International Glass Symposium Nový Bor
- 2016 Silver Medal of the President of the Senate of the Czech Republic

Listed in:

== Work ==
=== 1945–1969 ===
Soon after World War II, René Roubíček began to work with relief cutting of glass, which he conceived in a sculptural manner, removing the mass from a block of glass. He retained the carving's rawness and sculptural bulk. After the cut, strikingly sculptural vessels of asymmetrical shapes from the late 1940s, in which he artistically refined the modern spatial concept of the cutting on a simple shape (Antonín Dvořák (1946) - UPM, vase with a view of the Charles Bridge (1946) - Kamenický Šenov Glass Museum, Vase Prague (1946), a gift from the school to President Edvard Beneš) and experiments with optical glass, he later devoted himself to free-formed glass made at the glass furnace. His collaboration with the Nový Bor glassworks and with the glass masters Josef Rozinek (later Petr Novotný and Jiří Pačinek, Ajeto glassworks) led René Roubíček to switch from cold glass techniques to blown glass and glass sculptures made by shaping hot coloured glass. In his search for his own material form, Roubíček's work at that time was close to informel and his abstract glass sculptures were ahead of their time in their appreciation of fused glass. Miroslav Klivar describes Roubíček's sculptures as mythical surrealism and sees in them primordial images of psychic-lyrical-poetic visions of natural objects or transparent, mysterious forms of exuberance. In his work, he consistently drew on the properties of glass and modified and refined his original idea while working in the glassworks to achieve the intended effect.

René Roubíček first gained fame for his installation of metal structure, holding blocks of coloured hand-formed cast, engraved and painted glass (Glass - Matter - Shape - Expression) for Expo 58 in Brussels. He dramatically changed the perception of contemporary glass by this object, showed its artistic possibilities and was awarded the Grand Prix. The metal core was made by Jan Žaloudek, a blacksmith from Nový Bor, who later collaborated also in the production of large chandeliers. In 1959 Roubíček made an expanded composition in Prague and called it Glass – the Art of Today. He subsequently exhibited similar bold works in Moscow, Mumbai, Dili and São Paulo. His sculptures from the late 1950s and early 1960s showed the possibilities of using glass in architecture and aroused the interest of architects. Together with Stanislav Libenský and Jan Kotík, he was most credited for overcoming the notion of the servility of glass and of the imaginary border between applied and free art. Beginning with the Brussels exhibition, Czech glass embarked on the path of free artistic creation and broke with the world glass production oriented towards industrial design.

In addition to chamber sculptures (Objects, 1964) for the Czech glass exhibition at the Internationale Handwerksmesse in Munich (1964), he was able to create monumental sculptures modelled from flowing glass, hot-wound on a steel rod, cut and shaped with hand tools. In working with glass, he thus approached tachism and gestural painting. Water was an important part of his installation, echoing Roubíček's definition of glass from his students' first exhibition in 1945 as "'halted water'." He thus created, for example, glass columns with a fountain for the São Paulo Art Biennial (1966), later exhibited in Venice, Liège and at Expo 67 in Montreal (together with Jan Kotík). As early as 1959, the later founders of the American Studio Glass Movement became familiar with Roubíček's works, and the Montreal exhibition also influenced Dale Chihuly. Roubíček assembled the spatial composition Cloud, Water and Fountain of Life for Expo 70 in Osaka from bent glass rods on a metal core.

As an artist of the "Borské sklo" company, René Roubíček also designed some stained glass windows in the 1960s (Wall for the ceremonial hall in Ostrava, 1966, produced by the "Vitráže" factory, Nový Bor).

From the end of the 1960s he collaborated with architects and designed large glass chandeliers, in which the overhead light is reflected and mirrored in drops, grapes and lines of glass, for Czech embassies in Sofia (1969), London (arch. J. Šrámek), Washington, D.C. and Brasília. For other buildings abroad, he designed chandeliers with geometric outlines (Riegelsberg Town Hall (arch. B. Focht), Turnhout Water Castle (arch. E van Loven) or adapted lighting to the shape of the given space (staircase chandelier passing through six floors, Maison de la Saar, Paris, software IDS Centre, Saarbrücken, Rosengarten Congress Centre in Coburg, etc. He has designed chandeliers made of bent rod glass for important Czech new buildings of the 1960s (a six-metre chandelier for the Thermal Hotel, Karlovy Vary (arch. Věra Machoninová), the interior of a congress hall with 26 chandeliers for the InterContinental Hotel, Prague (arch. K. Filsak) and for public buildings (the Museum of Decorative Arts in Prague) in the Czech Republic.

=== 1970–1989 ===
At the Expo 70 in Osaka, he presented one of his top works from this period - the Cloud fountain, as a source of life-giving water, evoking an airy vortex, expanding in all directions by assemblies of bent glass rods on a metal structure with a total height of 7 m and width of 8 m, through which water flowed. His composition Cloud was judged by the communist regime (also in the context of other works by Stanislav Libenský, Jaroslava Brychtová, Vladimír Janoušek or Čestmír Kafka, who somehow reacted to the Warsaw Pact invasion of Czechoslovakia with the common theme "The Fate of Small Nations") as ideologically subversive (the sculpture was spontaneously renamed The Cloud of Bolshevism Descending Over Europe) and his domestic commissions were cancelled for several years. The composition entitled Homage to Nicolaus Copernicus (for 500th Anniversary of his birth, spatial object made of hand-shaped crystal rods on a metal structure, 500 x 400 cm, UPM 1973) he originally created for Poland, but after 1970, as a banned author, he was no longer allowed to export the object and it ended up in the depository of the Museum of Decorative Arts in Prague in Brandýs nad Labem. The artist reconstructed the object after 1990 and it is now part of the collection of modern art of the National Gallery in Prague.

René Roubíček did not design only chandeliers, but the opportunity to create works other than lighting fixtures out of glass was given to him especially by foreign architects. He created a wall of flat coloured glass for the theatre in Most (1977), a glass facade and ceiling lighting for the congress building in Coburg (1986), a luminous glass sculpture for Altersheim (1987), a glass stained glass window for the Gnadenkirche church in Würzburg (1988), a glass fountain for the casino in Nenning (1990), and glass sculptures for the sports hall in Saarbrücken (1992).

Roubíček's free works were created in close collaboration with renowned glass masters directly at the glass furnace. Josef Rozinek in particular was an ideal collaborator, whose craftsmanship directly influenced the realisation of Roubíček's artistic designs. From the 1970s and 1980s comes a large set of stylized blown Heads or Bysts for the European Glass Exhibition in Coburg (1977), considered one of the highlights of Roubíček's work, Fingers for the national glass show in Prague (1984) and parts of female bodies with a slight erotic subtext (Women's parts). All of these works are based on humorous perspective and improvisation during production in the glassworks. His figurative motifs are glass etudes, the purpose of which is to reveal the associative nature of glass, its ability to combine, suggest and evoke imagery, meanings and ideas. Glass figures were often created from a semi-finished pieces blown to wooden form (Crowd) and then subsequently reworked as sculptures. Here, the anonymity of the human form and the sparing use of colour enhance the overall effect based on causal associations and crowd psychology. His composition Conversation won the first prize at the 1980 exhibition in Lucerne.

=== 1989–2018 ===
In 1990, Roubíček presented a series of columns made of milky white tubes enlivened with spots, dots and strands of coloured glass fused into the surface of the column (Don't Worry, Be Happy, We're Returning to Europe) at the exhibition New Glass in Europe, 50 Artists - 50 Concepts in Düsseldorf as the first work created in the free era. Roubíček was playing clarinet and piano actively throughout his life. The set of glass musical instruments - Clarinets, which was created from 1985, evokes a parallel between blowing glass and producing tones in a wind instrument. Roubíček's Clarinettes and other musical instruments are close to works of "new materiality" and pop art. His series of drawings and collages "Instruments for Mozart" forms a parallel to glass sculptures.

He made a series Figures for the General Czechoslovak Exhibition in Prague in 1991, and in 1994 he created a glass sculpture made of glued coloured glass, Gehry's Dance. At the turn of the century he returned to engraving and cutting, and to working with flat glass and fused blocks (the series of perforated glass objects Tavenice, after 2000). Between 1995 and 2003 he created a series of about 30 reliefs made of cut glass prisms or fused elements glued to a glass panel (The Picture Gallery), which dissolve light and, when viewed from the back, appear as a painting on glass.

His free cycle Cylinders-Non-Cylinders includes a series of incised and cut cylindrical objects, varied in colour and unexpected shape. His chamber works consist of colorful and irregular bowls made of molten glass, which were created spontaneously and with the participation of the audience directly in the glassworks, hand-shaped stained glass objects (2011) related to his set of Clarinets, the cycles Forge of Angels (2009), or glass objects fused into a mould (Tie, 2008–2010). He is the author of the original Pavel Koutecký glass award for documentary film (since 2007). For his ninetieth birthday, he donated himself a set of glass cups A je dopito (Finished up) (2011).

In 2004, he returned to monumental work and created a set of ten three-metre high figures in metal and glass entitled Carnival in Venice, exhibited at the Biennale and then at the request of Meda Mládková at the Kampa Museum. In 2005, he created a glass fountain for the Marriott Hotel in Prague (removed in 2011) and in 2006 a 12-metre glass wall for the Sheraton Hotel in Shanghai. During the celebration of Czech glass and the exhibition Back to the Future the concept for a new glass object, EXPO Squared, was created in collaboration with Preciosa. It was exhibited at Design Days in Dubai and at Expo 2015 in Milan and an almost similar replica was acquired by the Museum of Glass and Costume Jewellery in Jablonec nad Nisou. At the same time, he worked on new chandeliers for Preciosa and Lasvit.

In 2006, for the 100th anniversary of Moser, he designed a collection of 12 vases, irregularly cut into three or more edges, with glued coloured and clear shapes. All the objects were exhibited at the 2007 Frankfurt Fair in the Moser company stand and found buyers. For the company's next anniversary in 2016, he created a new version of his 1957 Jubilee cup. In 2005, he created an original replica of his object from the Expo 58 for the exhibition of the Modern Art collection of the National Gallery in Prague in the Trade Fair Palace. For the celebration of the 160th anniversary of the Glass School in Kamenický Šenov in 2016, he joined in with glass light objects-columns, for which he used common products of the Elas Palme glassworks blown into wooden moulds. In collaboration with Jiří Pačinek, he created sculptures from hot molten glass right at the glass furnace until his very late age.

René Roubíček's pioneering work is inextricably linked to the worldwide emancipation of glassmaking in the sphere of free art. René Roubíček thinks of glass as a living matter that cannot be completely controlled and needs to be liberated. This philosophical approach to his own work is similar to jazz music and gives glass a privileged position in the context of modern world art.

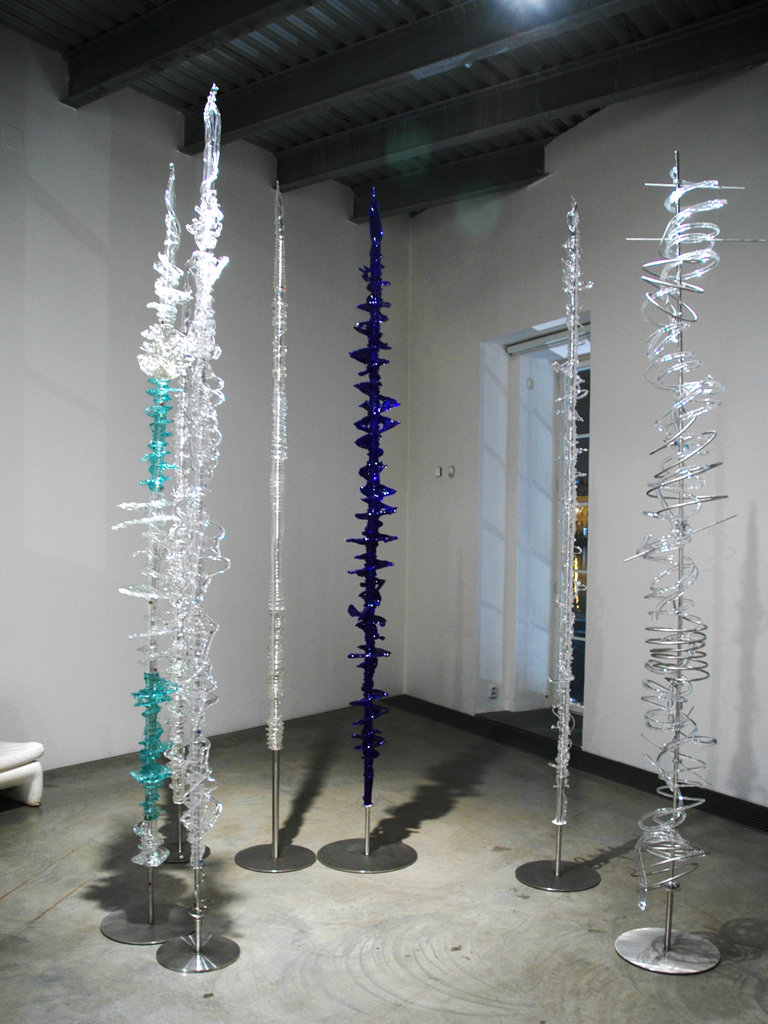
Montreal columns, 1966-2010

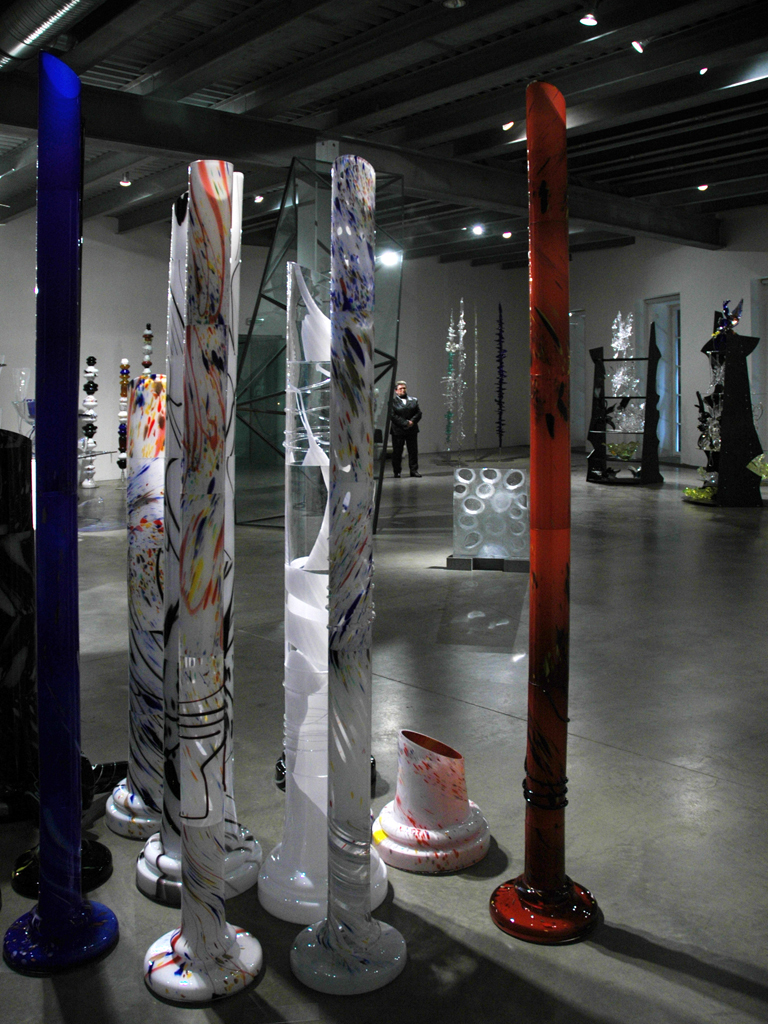
Don t Worry Be Happy - Returning to Europe, 1990

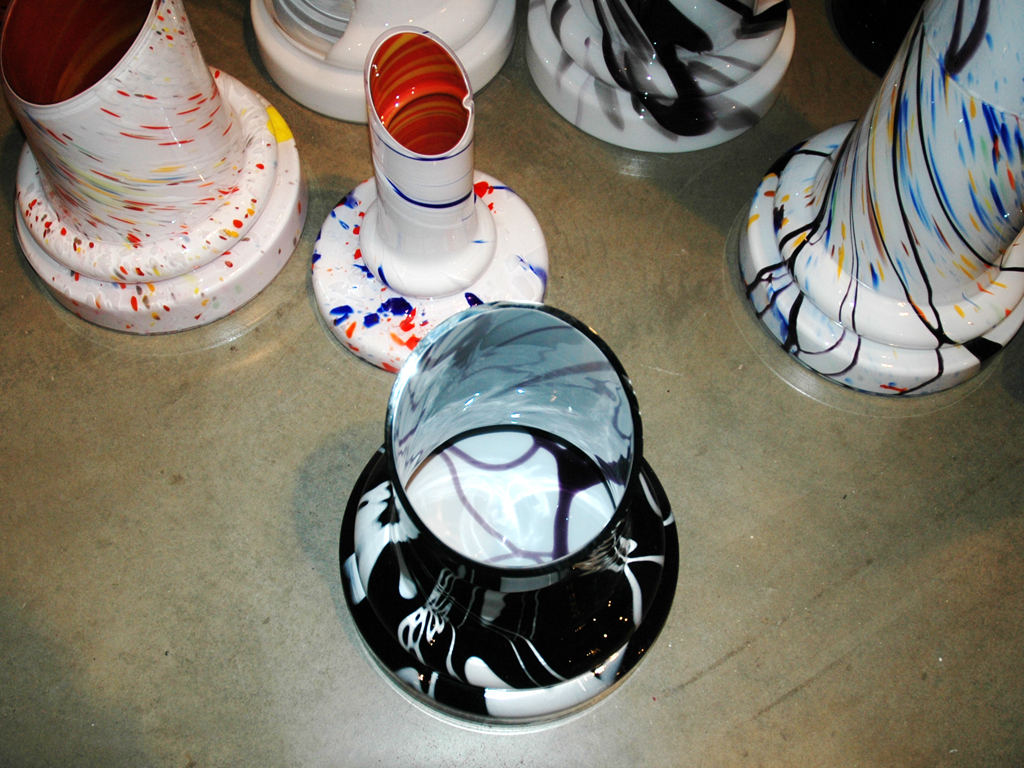
Don t Worry Be Happy - Returning to Europe, 1990

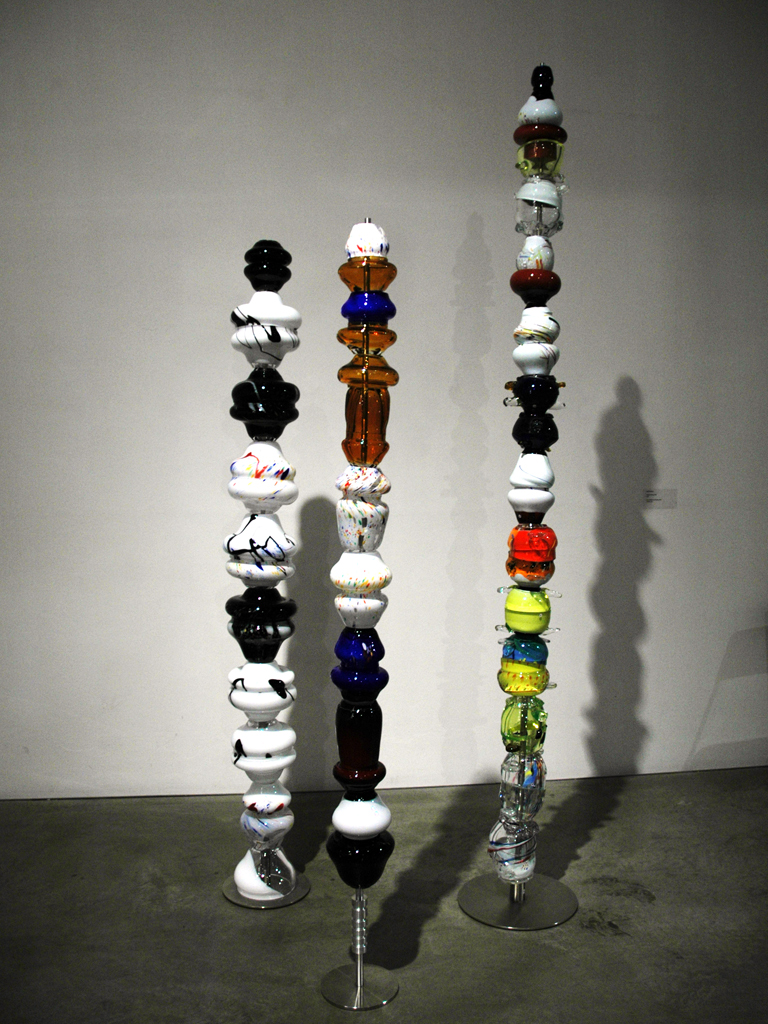
Capital columns, 2002

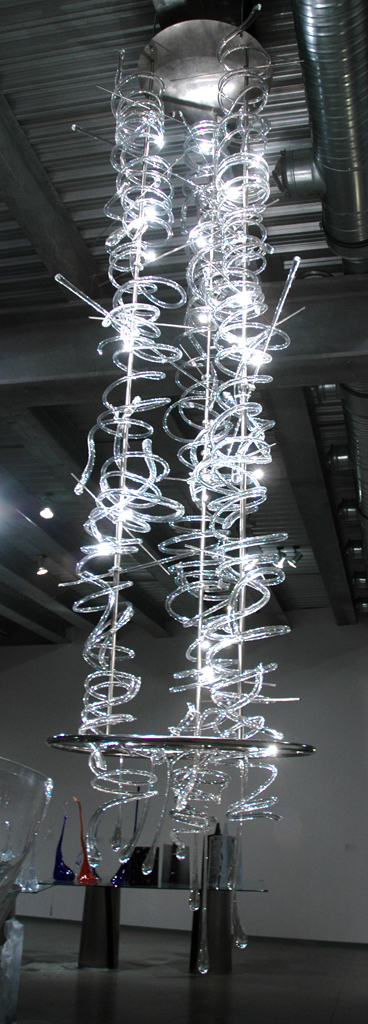
Chandelier, metal rods and rotationally shaped glass tubes, 2012
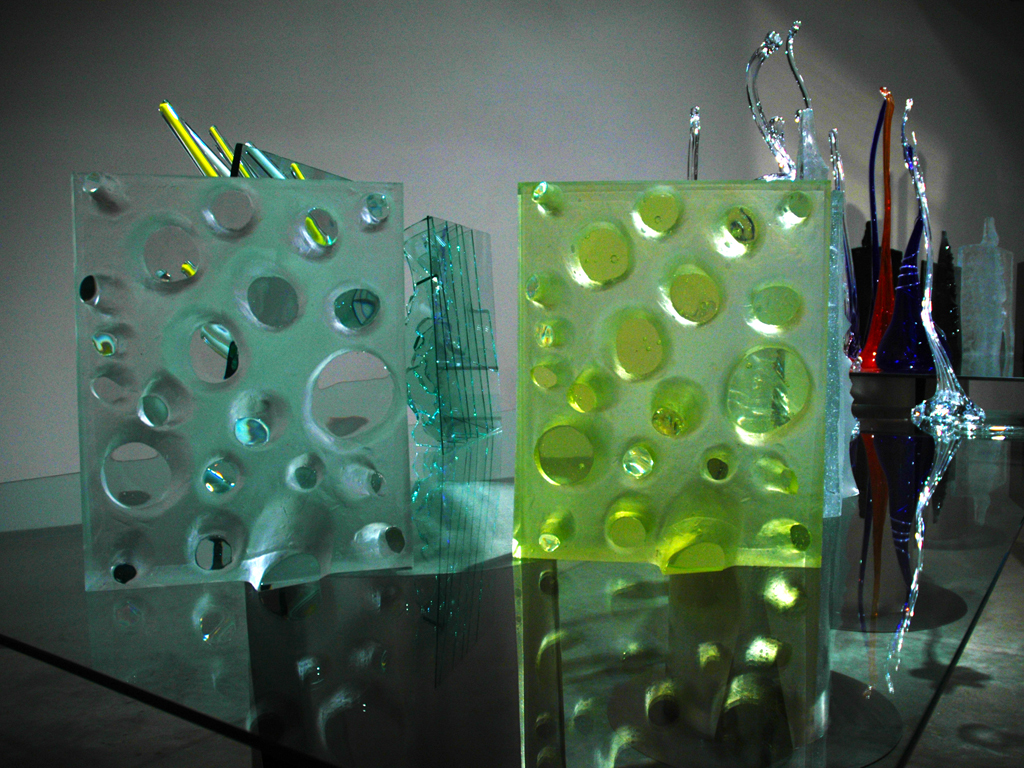
glass objects from the series Tavenice, 1995–1997

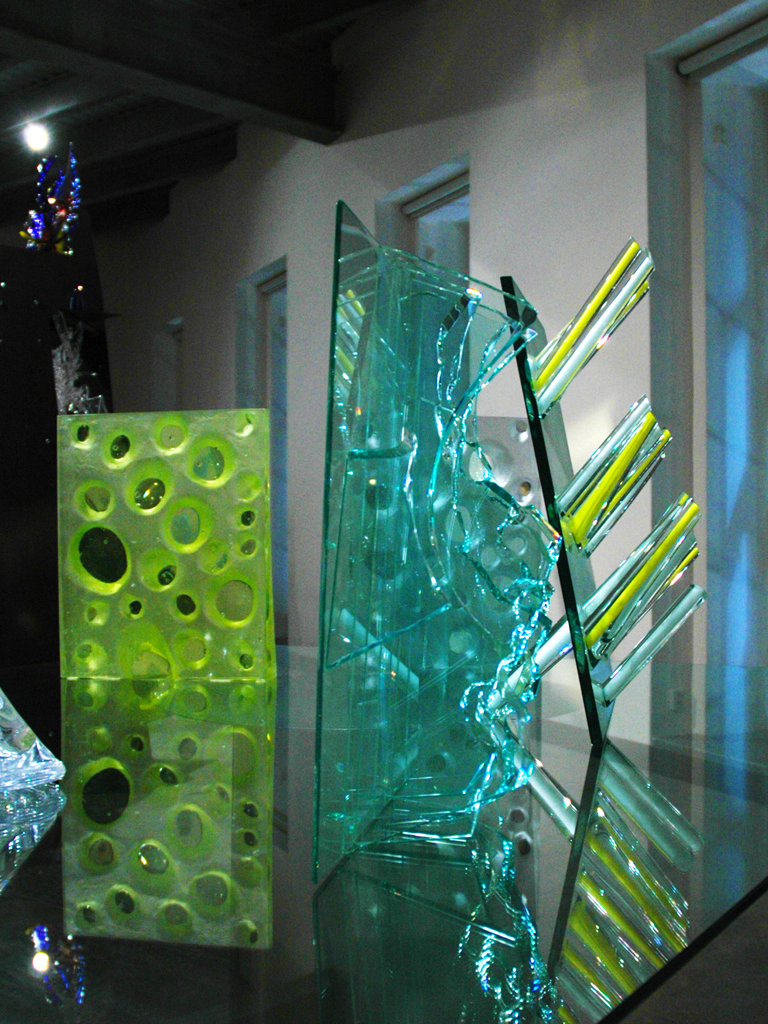
Tavenice, Crystal relief, Picture Gallery, 1995–1997

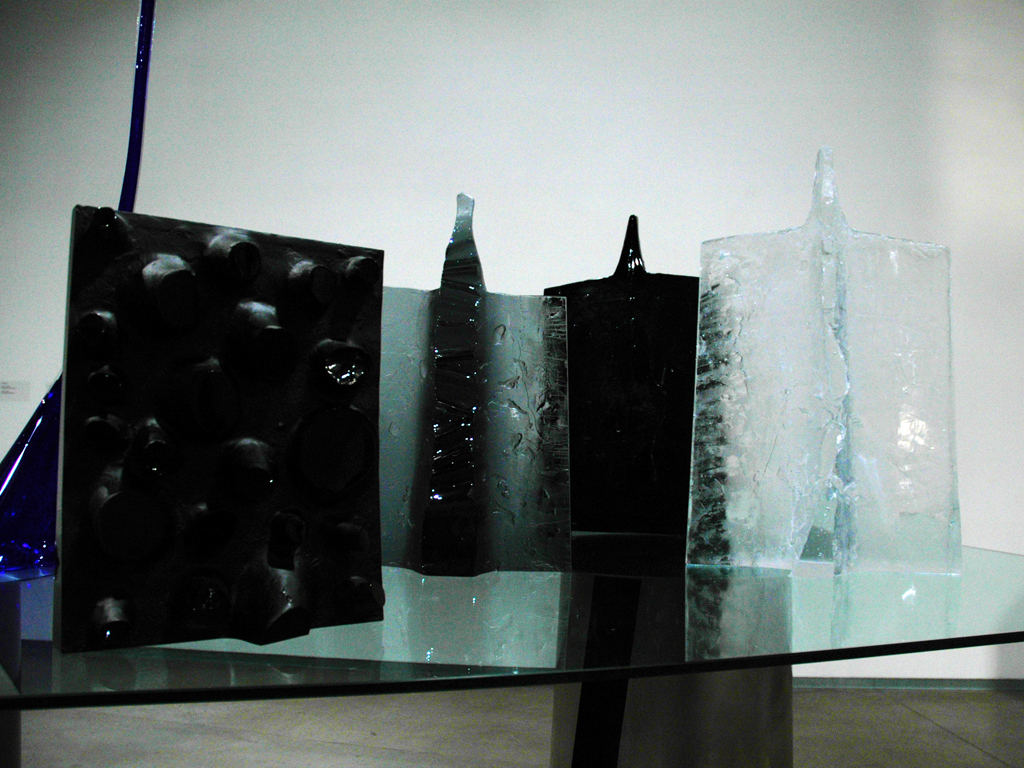
Clearing, Tie, glass objects fused into a mould, 2008-2010

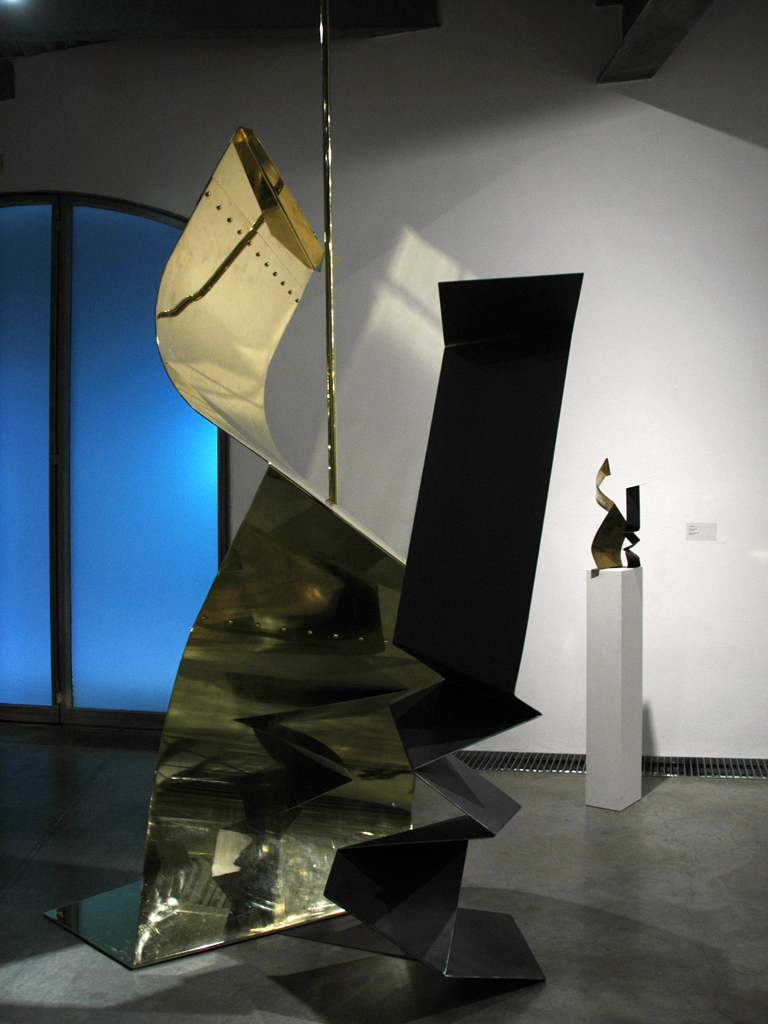
Dialogue, polished brass and stainless steel sheet, 2012
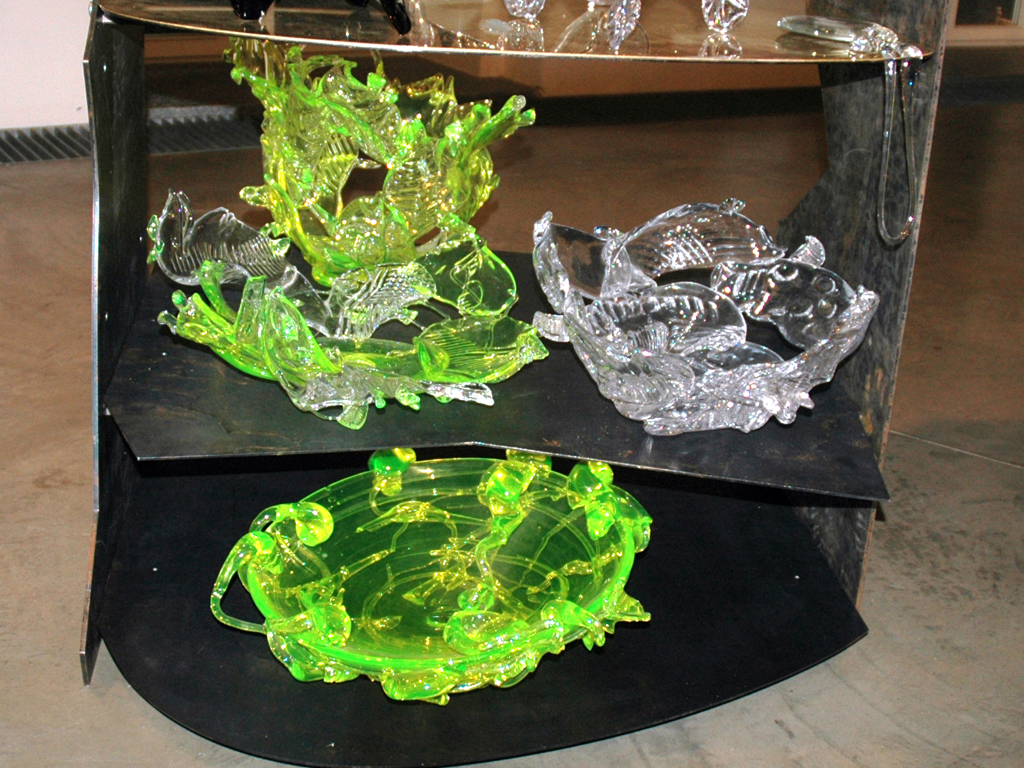
Bowls II, from the cycle Forge of Angels

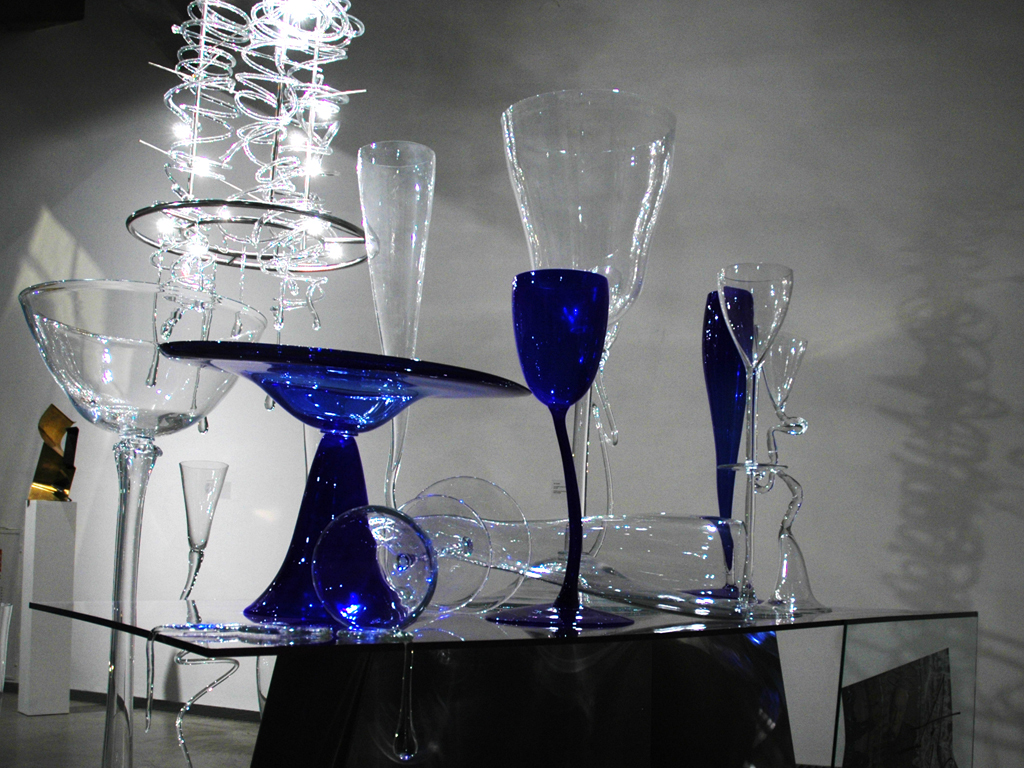
Finished up, 2011

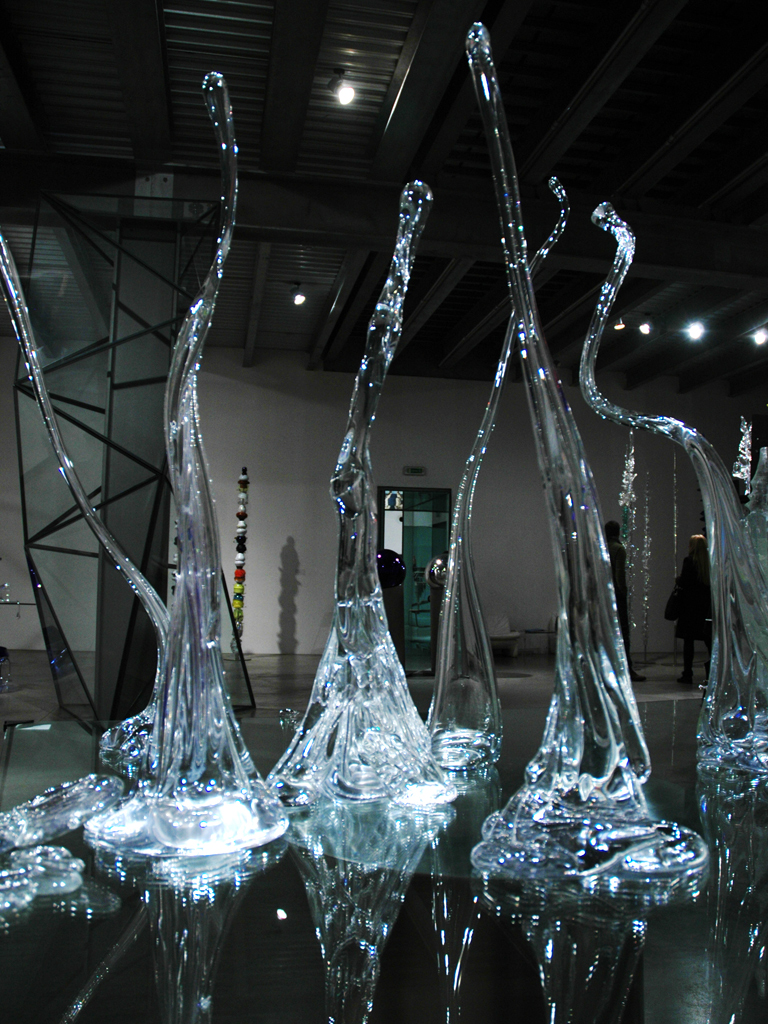
Hand-shaped glass objects, 2011

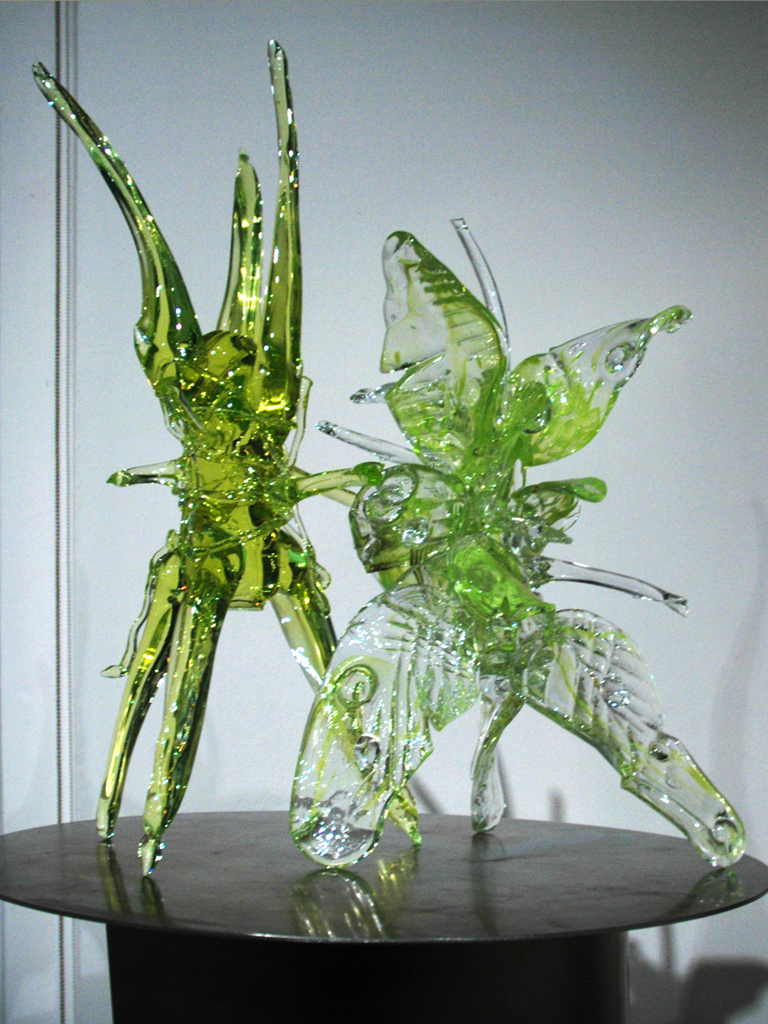
Angel, Winner - from the cycle Forge of Angels, 2009

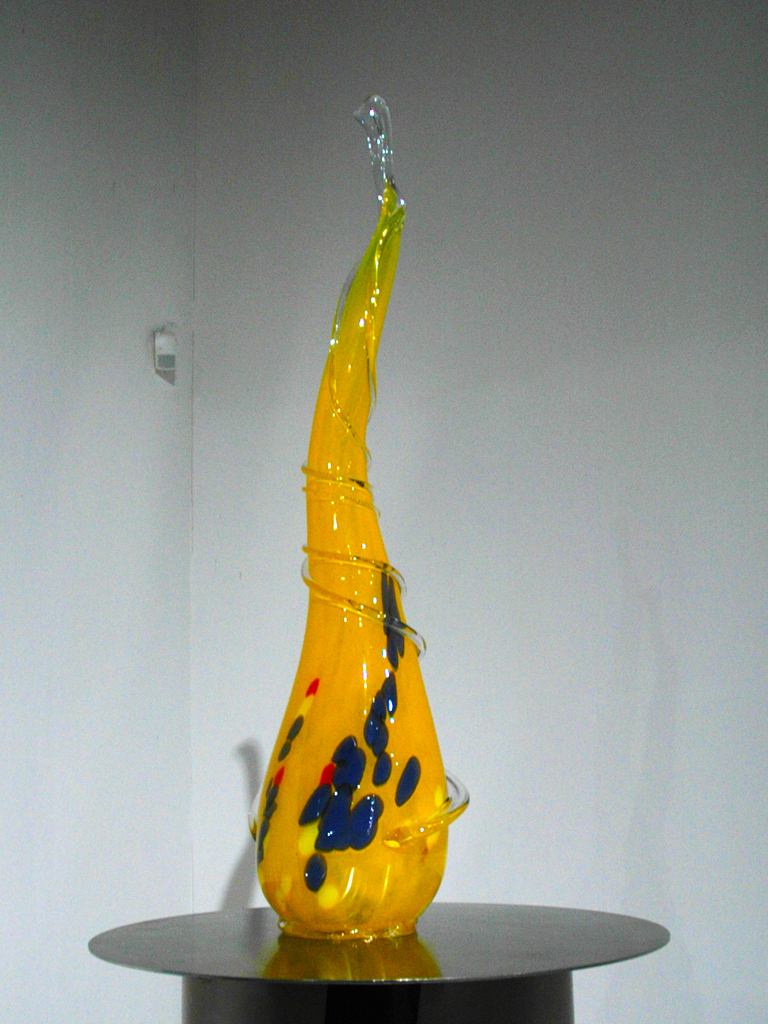
Glass object, 2011

=== Representation in collections ===
- Kunstsammlungen der Veste Coburg
- Musée des Arts Décoratifs, Paris
- The Corning Museum of Glass, New York
- Museum of Glass, Tacoma, Washington
- The Saxe Collection, San Francisco
- Koganezaki Glass Museum, Japan
- Yokohama Museum of Art
- Stedelijk Museum, Amsterdam
- Museum Bellerive, Zurich
- Victoria and Albert Museum, London
- Ulster Museum, Belfast
- Pinakotek der Moderne, Munich
- Akademie der Künste, Berlin
- Das Europäische Museum für Modernes Glas, Schlosspark, Rosenau
- Glasmuseum Hentrich, Düsseldorf
- Glasmuseum Ebeltoft
- Museum für Kunsthandwerk, Frankfurt am Main
- Glassworks Museum, Frauenau
- Badisches landesmuseum, Karlsruhe
- Musée Cantonal des Beaux-Arts, Lausanne
- National Gallery in Prague
- Moravian Gallery in Brno
- Museum of Decorative Arts, Prague
- National Museum in Wrocław
- Museum of Glass and Jewellery in Jablonec nad Nisou
- North Bohemian Museum p.o., Liberec
- East Bohemian Museum, Pardubice
- Homeland History Museum in Olomouc

Listed in

=== Exhibitions ===
==== Author´s (selection) ====
- 1961 Miluše and René Roubíček: Glass, Gallery of Youth, Aleš Hall of the Umělecká beseda, Prague
- 1967 Miluše and René Roubíček: Glass, Cabinet of Applied Arts, Brno
- 2000/2001 René Roubíček: Liberated Glass, Koganezaki Glass Museum, Japan
- 2003 "Masters of European Glassmaking": Miluše and René Roubíček, Museum of Decorative Arts in Prague
- 2012 René Roubíček: Chandeliers, Glass Museum, Kamenický Šenov
- 2012/2013 René Roubíček: Glass and Why Not I.!, Museum Kampa - Jan and Meda Mládek Foundation, Prague
- 2015 Miluše and René Roubíček: Glass, Špilberk Castle, Brno
- 2022 Miluše & René Roubíčkovi: 100, Museum of Glass and Jewellery in Jablonec nad Nisou
- 2022 René Roubíček: The Founding Father of Modern Glass, Zdeněk Sklenář Gallery, Prague

==== Collective (selection) ====
- 1952 Art Glass, Museum of Decorative Arts, Prague, Museum of Decorative Arts, Brno
- 1957 Vetro di Boemia, La Triennale di Milano, Milano
- 1958 Expo 58, Brussels
- 1959 Czechoslovak Glass, Moscow Manege
- 1959 Glass '59, The Corning Museum of Glass, Corning
- 1960 Czechoslovak Modern Glass, Czechoslovak Cultural Centre, Cairo
- 1963 Modern Glass in Czechoslovakia, Silesian Museum, Wrocław
- 1964 Tschechoslowakisches Glas, Grassi - Museum für Angewandte Kunst, Leipzig
- 1965 Bohemian Glass, Victoria and Albert Museum, London
- 1965 Tsjekkoslovakisk glass, keramik og tekstiler, Kunstindustrimuseet - The Museum of Decorative Arts and Design, Oslo
- 1965 Tšekkoslovakian taideteollisuutta / Tjeckoslovakisk konstindustri, Helsingin Taidehalli / Helsingfors Konsthall, Helsinki
- 1965 La transfiguration de l´art tchèque: Peinture - sculpture - verre - collages, Palais de Congrès de Liège
- 1966 2e Salon international de Galeries pilotes Lausanne, Palais de Rumine, Lausanne
- 1966 Tschechoslowakische Kunst der Gegenwart, Akademie der Künste, Berlin
- 1966 Arte actual Checoslovaco, Museo de Arte Moderno, Ciudad de México
- 1966 Current Tendencies in Czechoslovak Applied Art and Industrial Art, Municipal House, Prague
- 1967 Tjeckoslovakisk nutidskonst, Göteborg, Lund, Örebro, Varnamo, Norrköping, Nyköping, Hälsingborg, Stockholm
- 1967 Expo 67, Montreal
- 1967 Exhibition of sculptures and glass, Gallery of the Union of Sculptors, Warsaw
- 1969 50 years of Czech applied art and industrial design, Mánes, Prague, 50 Jahre der Tschechischen angewandten Kunst und industrial design, MAK - Österreichisches Museum für angewandte Kunst / Gegenwartskunst, Wien
- 1969 L´art tchèque actuel, Renault Champs - Élysées, Paris
- 1969 Sculpture and the city, Liberec
- 1970 Expo 70 - Czechoslovakia Pavilion, Osaka
- 1970 Contemporary Czech Glass, Mánes, Prague
- 1970 Intents and Wages: 50 Years of Czech Applied Art and Industrial Plastic Art, Silesian Museum, Wrocław
- 1971 45 zeitgenössische Künstler aus der Tschechoslowakei. Malerei, Plastik, Grafik, Glasobjekte, Baukunst, Köln
- 1972/1973 Angewandte Kunst aus der ČSSR, Kunsthalle Weimar, Kunsthalle Rostock, Neue Galerie, Berlin
- 1973 Metamorphosis of Glass, Moravian Gallery in Brno
- 1974 Hedendaagse ambachtskunst uit Tsjechoslowakije, Bruges
- 1975 Dix siècles d'art tchèque et slovak, Grand Palais - Galeries nationales, Paris
- 1977 Arte Checoslovaco - Vidrio, cerámica, joyas y tapices, Sala Cairasco, Las Palmas, Canary Island
- 1978 Checoslovaquia en las artes del vidrio, la porcelana y la pintura naif, Galerie Arteta, Bilbao
- 1980 Die Kunst Osteuropas im 20. Jahrhundert, Garmisch-Partenkirchen
- 1981 Czechoslovakian Glass 1350–1980, The Corning Museum of Glass
- 1981 Art in Glass, Glass in Art, Fendrick Gallery, Washington D.C.
- 1981 Glaskunst 81, Orangerie, Kassel
- 1983 Space 2, Trade Palace, Prague
- 1983 Czechoslovak Glass: Seven Masters (Brychtová, Cígler, Harcuba, Kopecký, Libenský, Lišková, Roubíček), American Craft Museum New York (curator Meda Mládková)
- 1984 Czechoslovak Glass '84: Art Glass Creation, Valdštejn Riding Hall, Prague
- 1985 One Hundred Years of Czech Applied Art: Czech Applied Art 1885-1985 from the Collections of the Museum of Decorative Arts in Prague on the 100th Anniversary of the Museum's Founding, Museum of Decorative Arts, Prague
- 1985 Zweiter Coburger Glaspreis für moderne Glasgestaltung in Europa, Kunstsammlungen der Veste Coburg, Coburg
- 1986 Contemporary Czechoslovak Glass in Architecture, University of London, Institute of Education, London, Glynn Vivian Art Gallery, Swansea (Wales), The Billingham Art Gallery, Billingham (Stockton-on-Tees)
- 1986/1987 Expressions en verre, Musée des Arts décoratifs, Lausanne
- 1987 Vidre d´art, Hivernacle Barcelona, Barcelona
- 1989/1990 Verres de Bohême: 1400-1989 chefs-d'œuvre des musées de Tchécoslovaquie, Musée des Arts décoratifs, Paris
- 1989/1990 Reflex der Jahrhunderte, Grassi - Museum für Angewandte Kunst, Leipzig
- 1990 Glastec 90, Messe Halle 6, Düsseldorf
- 1990 Neues Glas in Europa: 50 Künstler - 50 konzepte / New Glass in Europe: 50 Artist - 50 Concepts, Museum Kunstpalast, Düsseldorf
- 1991 Prague Glass Prize 91, Mánes, Prague
- 1992 Czech and Slovak Art of the 20th Century, National Museum in Wrocław
- 1992/1993 La magie du verre: Quinze artistes verriers tchèques, Galerie d'art Annie Chevalley, Montreux (Vevey)
- 1992/1993 Festival of Czech and Japanese Glass 1992 - 1993, Azabu Museum of Decorative Arts, Tokyo, Village of Glass, Hiroshima, Machida City Museum of Graphic Art Machida, Tokyo, Bohemia Glass Museum Karuizawa, Nagano
- 1992/1993 Art Discussion 1992, Mánes, Prague
- 1993 Bohemia. Cristal, Real Fábrica de Cristales, Segovia
- 1996, 1997, 1998, 2000 Umělecká beseda, Mánes, Prague
- 1998/1999 Life in the Rhythm of the Atom (Exhibition for the 40th anniversary of Czechoslovak participation in the World Exhibition EXPO 58 in Brussels), Trade Fair Palace, Prague
- 1999 Glass, The Studio Glass Gallery, London, Broadfield House Glass Museum, Kingswinford, Koganezaki Crystal Park Glass Museum, Shizuoka
- 2000/2001 Light Transfigured - Contemporary Czech Glass Sculpture, Toyama Shimin Plaza, Toyama, Hiroshima City Museum of Contemporary Art, Kanazu Forest of Creation, Fukui, Odakyu Museum, Tokyo
- 2002 Glass Behind the Iron Curtain: Czech Design, 1948–1978, The Corning Museum of Glass
- 2009 Kunst zur Zeit de kalten Krieges, Barockschloss Riegersburg
- 2009 Connections 2009, Contemporary European Glass Sculpture, Mánes, Prague
- 2010 New Sensitivity, National Art Museum of China (NAMOC), Beijing
- 2010 GLASS.KLASIK, Queen Anne's Summer Palace (Belveder), Prague
- 2011 A Homage to Glass, North Bohemian Museum p.o., Liberec
- 2012 Generations in Glass (R. Roubíček and B. Šípek), New Town Hall, Prague
- 2012/2013 All the best! Czech Glass Art, Museum of Decorative Arts, Prague
- 2013 In Art Freedom, Clam-Gallas Palace, Prague
- 2015 Design Days Dubai, Expo Milan (Expo squared)
- 2015/2016 Building the State. Representation of Czechoslovakia in art, architecture and design, Veletržní palác, Prague
- 2016 Concerto Glassico, Tuscany Palace, Prague
- 2016 7+1 Masters of Czech Glass, Museum Kampa – Jan and Meda Mládek Foundation, Prague
- 2017 The Automatic Exhibition: the Czechoslovak Pavilion at Expo 67 in Montreal, Retromuseum, Cheb
- 2017 No Limits: Contemporary Art Glass from the Czech Republic (International Triennial of Glass and Costume Jewellery 2017), St. Anne's Church, Jablonec nad Nisou
- 2018 Avant Garde: The Great Game of the Future, Trade Fair Pavilion G, Brno
- 2018/2019 Two in One: Czech and Slovak Glass Design 1918–2018, Museum of Glass and Costume Jewellery in Jablonec nad Nisou

== Sources ==
=== Author catalogues ===
- Miluše and René Roubíček: Glass, Moravian Gallery in Brno 1967
- René Roubíček, Miluše Roubíčková (text by Antonín Langhamer), Museum of Glass and Jewellery Jablonec nad Nisou 1992
- Sklo / Glass (Miluše Roubíčková, René Roubíček), 216 p., The Studio Glass Gallery London 1999, ISBN 0-9536026-0-5, ISBN 0-9536026-1-3
- René Roubíček: Liberated Glass, (text by Atsushi Takeda), Koganezaki Glass Museum 2000 (Jap., en.)
- René Roubíček / 1998 - 2003 (Picture Gallery - glass relief), Museum of Decorative Arts in Prague, 2003
- René Roubíček: Glass and Why Not I.!, Miluše Roubíčková: Glass - and why not II.!, text by Jiří Šetlík, Museum Kampa - Jan and Meda Mládek Foundation 2013, ISBN 978-80-87344-17-0
- Jiří Bohdálek: Miluše and René Roubíček: Glass, Brno City Museum 2015
- Glass Will Not Wait - Portrait of the Jazz Glassmaker René Roubíček, text by Petr Volf, Galerie Zdeněk Sklenář, Prague 2015, ISBN 978-80-87430-45-3
- René Roubíček - Less Known Traits of the Glass Artist, 72 p., Spolek sympozia rytého skla, Liberec 2022, ISBN 978-80-11-02594-6

=== Encyclopaedias ===
- Ray Grover, L. Grover, Contemporary Art Glass, 208 p., Crown Publishers 1975, ISBN 978-0517516287
- Geoffry Beard, International Modern Glass, London 1976
- Susanne K. Frantz, Contemporary Glass: A World Survey from the Corning Museum of Glass, 1989
- Helmut Ricke (ed.), Reflex der Jahrhunderte, 352 p., Grassi - Museum für Angewandte Kunst, Leipzig 1989
- Sylva Petrová, Jean-Luc Olivié, Verres de Bohême (1400-1989 chefs-d'œuvre des musées de Tchécoslovaquie), Flammarion, Paris - Union des Arts Décoratifs, Paris 1989, ISBN 2-08-012144-8
- Sylva Petrová, Jean-Luc Olivié, Bohemian Glass (1400-1989), 140 p., Flammarion, Paris - Union des Arts Décoratifs, Paris 1990, ISBN 2-08-013502-3
- Peter Layton, Glass Art, 216 p., A & C Black, University of Washington Press 1996, ISBN 0-295-97565-2
- Antonín Langhamer, Legenda o českém skle / The Legend of Bohemian Glass / Legende vom böhmischen Glas, 292 p., TIGRIS spol. s r. o., Prštné, Zlín 1999, ISBN 80-86062-02-3
- Sylva Petrová, Light Transfigured - Contemporary Czech Glass Sculpture, Asahi Shimbun 2000
- Sylva Petrová, Czech Glass, Gallery, spol. s r.o. (Jaroslav Kořán), Prague 2001, ISBN 80-86010-44-9
- Dan Klein, Artists in Glass (Late Twentieth Century Masters in Glass), 240 p., Mitchell Beazley, London 2001, ISBN 1-84000-340-5
- Who is Who in Contemporary Glass Art, Joachim Waldrich Verlag, München 1993 (pp. 470–473)
- Diane E. Foulds, A Guide to Czech & Slovak Glass, 208 p., ECI 1995, ISBN 978-8090002968
- Helmut Ricke (ed.), Czech Glass 1945–1980, 448 p., Museum Kunstpalast (Kunstmuseum Düsseldorf), Arnoldsche 2005, ISBN 3-89790-217-6
- Milan Hlaveš (ed.), Czech Glass 1945–1980, Creation in the Age of Misery and Illusion, UPM and NGP Prague 2007, ISBN 978-80-7101-069-2
- Sylva Petrová, Czech Glass, 428 p., Academy of Arts, Architecture and Design in Prague, 2018, ISBN 978-80-87989-50-0

=== Collective catalogues (selection) ===
- Karel Hetteš, Contemporary Glass, North Bohemian Museum Liberec 1955
- Karel Hetteš, Vetro di Boemia (XI. Triennale di Milano - sezione Cecoslovacchia), UPM 1957
- Czechoslovak Modern Glass, Czechoslovak Cultural Centre, Cairo 1960
- Alena Adlerová, Tschechoslowakisches Glas, Grassi - Museum für Angewandte Kunst 1964
- Karel Hetteš, Sklo borských výtvarníků / Glass by Bor artists, Museum of Glass and Jewellery in Jablonec nad Nisou 1964
- Joseph Philippe, La transfiguration de l´art tchèque, Liége 1965
- Libuše Urešová, Trenchard Cox: Bohemian Glass, Victoria and Albert Museum, London 1965
- Karel Hetteš, Jussi Saukkonen, Tšekkoslovakian taideteollisuutta / Tjeckoslovakisk konstindustri, Helsingin Taidehalli / Helsingfors Konsthall, Helsinki 1965 (fin., sw.)
- Arte actual Checoslovaco, Museo de Arte Moderno, Mexico City 1966
- Jindřich Chalupecký, Hans Bernhard Scharoun: Tschechoslowakische Kunst der Gegenwart, Akademie der Künste, Berlin 1966
- Karel Hetteš, Aktuální tendence českého umění / Tendances actuelles de l'art tchèque, Czechoslovak Section of the International Association of Art Critics - AICA, Union of Czechoslovak Artists 1966
- Jiří Kotalík, Tjeckoslovakisk nutidskonst, Svea Galleriet, Stockholm 1967
- Miroslav Míčko, L'art tchèque actuel, Renault Champs - Élysées, Paris 1969
- Karel Hetteš, Wilhelm Mrazek, 50 let českého užitého umění a průmyslového výtvarnictví (Meilensteine der Entwicklung in den Jahren 1918 - 1968) / 50 Jahre der Tschechischen angewandten Kunst und industrial design (Meilensteine der Entwicklung in den Jahren 1918 - 1968), Prague, Wien
- Karel Hetteš, Contemporary Czech Glass, Mánes, Prague 1970
- Dušan Šindelář, Contemporary Art Glass in Czechoslovakia, Obelisk, Prague 1970
- Ľudmila Peterajová, 45 zeitgenössische Künstler aus der Tschechoslowakei, Baukunst, Köln 1971
- Jiřina Medková, Metamorphosis of Glass (Show of Contemporary Czechoslovak Glass Sculpture), Moravian Gallery in Brno 1973
- Gerhard Pommeranz-Liedtke, Alena Adlerová: Ausstellung Angewandte Kunst aus der ČSSR, Weimar 1973
- Hedendaagse ambachtskunst uit Tsjechoslowakije, Bruges 1974
- Dix siècles d'art tchèque et slovak, Grand Palais - Galeries nationales, Paris 1975
- Arte Checoslovaco - Vidrio, cerámica, joyas y tapices, Sala Cairasco, Las Palmas, Canary Island 1977
- Alena Adlerová Kudělková Königová, Contemporary Glass, Odeon, Prague 1979
- Petr Spielmann, Die Kunst Osteuropas im 20. Jahrhundert in öffentlichen Sammlungen der Bundesrepublik Deutschland und Berlins (West), Museum Bochum 1980
- Art in Glass, Glass in Art: Cigler, Lišková, Roubíček, Fendrick Gallery, Washington D.C. 1981
- Alena Adlerová et al., Czechoslovakian Glass 1350–1980, The Corning Museum of Glass 1981
- Peter Schmitt, Glaskunst 81, 276 p., Werkstatt Verlag Kassel 1981, ISBN 3-88752-996-0
- Meda Mládková, Miroslav Klivar, Paul J. Smith, Czechoslovak Glass: Seven Masters, American Craft Museum New York 1983
- Jiřina Medková, Glass Sculpture (Contemporary Czechoslovak Art), Brno House of Arts 1983
- Alena Adlerová, Moderne Tjekkoslovakisk Glas, Kunstindustrimuseet - Museum of Art and Design, Copenhagen 1983
- Jiří Karbaš, Czech Visual Art in Architecture 1945 - 1985, 157 p., Odeon 1985
- František Arnošt (ed). Czech Glass (History of Czech glass and the present in the Crystalex Nový Bor branch), 216 p., Crystalex, Nový Bor 1985
- Joachim Kruse, Zweiter Coburger Glaspreis für moderne Glasgestaltung in Europa 1985, 432 p., Kunstsammlungen der Veste Coburg 1985, ISBN 3-87472-057-8
- Mervyn Brown, Alena Adlerová, Contemporary Czechoslovak Glass in Architecture, Visiting Arts Unit of Great Britain 1986
- Jan Rous et al., One Hundred Years of Czech Applied Art (Czech Applied Art 1885-1985 from the collections of the Museum of Decorative Arts in Prague on the occasion of the centenary of the museum's foundation), Prague 1987
- Stanislav Libenský et al., Glass Sculpture, Brno House of Art 1987
- Pasqual Maragall, Pilar Muñoz, Vidre d´art, Ajuntament de Barcelona 1987, ISBN 84-7609-156-7
- Paul-René Martin, Rosmarie Lippuner, Catherine Zoritchak, Expressions en verre (200 sculptures de verre contemporaines, Europe, USA, Japon), Musée des Arts décoratifs, Lausanne 1986, ISBN 2-88244-000-6
- Alena Adlerová, Artistes verriers de Tchécoslovaquie, Galerie Transparence, Brussels 1988
- Antonín Hartmann, Bohemia Glass Škrdlovice, Ústředí uměleckých řemesel 1989
- Antonín Langhamer, Ladislav Pekař, Bohemia Crystal (Glass, that conquered the World), Skloexport a.s., 1991
- Douglas Heller, Sylva Petrová, Prague Glass Prize 91, Glass Association, Heller Gallery, Union of Visual Artists 1991
- Vlasta Čiháková Noshiro et al., Festival of Czech and Japanese Glass 1992 - 1993, Japan-Czech Committee for Reciprocal Exhibition Festival of Czech and Japanese Glass 1992 - 1993, Prague 1992
- Antonín Dufek et al., Applied Art of the 1960s, Moravian Gallery in Brno 1996
- Museo municipal de arte en vidrio de Alcorcón (Colección permanente), Museo Municipal de Arte en Vidrio Mava 1997
- Miroslav Klivar, Czech Glass Sculpture, 192 p., Moravia Press, Břeclav 1999, ISBN 80-86181-23-5
- Dan Klein, Artists in Glass (Late Twentieth Century Masters in Glass), 240 p., Mitchell Beazley, London 2001, ISBN 1-84000-340-5
- Martina Pachmanová, Markéta Pražanová (eds.), Vysoká škola uměleckoprůmyslová v Praze / Academy of Arts, Architecture and Design in Prague 1885–2005, 340 p., Galerie hlavního města Prahy 2005, ISBN 80-86863-09-3
- Petr Volf, Excitement (Conversations about art from 1995 to 2005), 349 s., BB art, s.r.o., Prague 2006, ISBN 80-7341-729-4
- Tina Oldknow, Contemporary Glass Sculptures and Panels, The Corning Museum of Glass 2008, ISBN 978-0-87290-168-1
- Milan Knížák, Tomáš Vlček (eds.), 155 artworks of the 20th century from the National Gallery in Prague, 335 p., National Gallery in Prague 2009, ISBN 978-80-7035-412-4
- Iveta Pavlovičová, Hanno Karlhuber, Kunst zur Zeit de kalten Krieges / Kunst und Design 1950-1989 / Art and Design 1950–1989, RICA 2009
- Milan Handl et al., Connections 2009 (Contemporary European Glass Sculpture), 180 p., Agency Prague Cherry, spol. s.r.o. 2009
- Milan Knížák et al., Xin gan jue / New Sensitivity (1960 zhi 1980 nian dai de Jieke diao su yi shu zhan / Czech Sculpture of the 1960s - 1980s / České sochařství 60. - 80. let. 20. století), National Gallery in Prague 2010
- Milan Knížák et al., České moderní a současné umění 1890 - 2010, 2. díl / Modern and Contemporary Czech Art 1890–2010, part two, National Gallery in Prague 2010, ISBN 978-80-7035-447-6 (en. edition ISBN 978-807035-448-3)
- Milan Hlaveš, Stanislav Libensky Award 2010 / Sklo.klasik, FOIBOS a.s., art agency 2010, ISBN 978-80-87073-25-4
- Oldřich Palata, Linda Paukertová Leffová, Hold sklu / A Homage to Glass, Severočeské muzeum Liberec 2011, ISBN 978-80-87266-06-9
- Milena Bartlová (ed.), Budování státu / Building a State (Reprezentace Československa v umění, architektuře a designu / The Representation of Czechoslovakia in Art, Architecture and Design), VŠUP Prague 2015, ISBN 978-80-87989-01-2
- Jana Kunešová (ed.), The Story of Bohemian Glass, Uměleckoprůmyslové museum, National Museum of Korea 2015, ISBN 978-80-7036-439-0 (NM), ISBN 978-80-7101-147-7 (UPM)
- Milan Hlaveš et al. (ed.), 7 + 1, Masters of Czech Glass, Museum Kampa - Jan and Meda Mládek Foundation, Prague 2016, ISBN 978-80-87344-32-3
- Petr Nový, No limits (Mezinárodní trienále skla a bižuterie / International Triennial of Glass & Jewellery 2017) (Současné umělecké sklo z České republiky / Contemporary Artistic Glass from Czech Republic), Muzeum skla a bižuterie v Jablonci nad Nisou 2016, ISBN 978-80-86397-19-1
- Ondřej Chrobák et al., Avant Garde (The Great Game of the Future), Profil Media, s.r.o., Brno 2018
- Šárka Radová, Jaroslav Vanča, Soutok, Umělecká beseda, Prague 2018, ISBN 978-80-270-4221-0
- Sylva Petrová et al., Once Upon a Time: Sklo / Time Out of Mind Mind out of Time: Glass, 219 p., 8smička, Humpolec 2020, ISBN 978-80-907185-7-9
- Petr Nový, Designová 10° / Decade of Design (2010-2019), 132 p., Museum of Glass and Jewellery in Jablonec nad Nisou 2020, ISBN 978-80-86397-35-1
- Martina Mertová, Rostislav Švácha, We were world class! (Expo Brussels, Montreal, Osaka from the archive of architect Miroslav Repa), Museum of Art Olomouc 2022, ISBN 978-80-88103-90-5
- Caterina Tognon, Sylva Petrová (eds.), Vetro boemo: i grandi maestri / Bohemian Glass: The Great Masters (Václav Cigler, Vladimír Kopecký, Stanislav Libenský, Jaroslava Brychtová, René Roubíček, Miluše Roubíčková, con / with Josef Sudek), Skira editore, Milano 2023, ISBN 978-88-572-4985-8 on-line

=== Other ===
- České ateliéry / Czech studios (71 contemporary artists ), 2005, Art CZ, Prague, ISBN 80-239-5528-4
- Petr Volf, Vzrušení: Rozhovory o umění z let 1995–2005 / Excitement: conversations about art from 1995 to 2005, 350 pp, BB art 2006, ISBN 978-80-7341-729-1
- Hynek Glos, Petr Vizina, Stará garda / Old Guard, nakl. Argo, Prague 2016, pp. 108–115, ISBN 978-80-257-1881-0
