= Crystalex =

Czech glass company

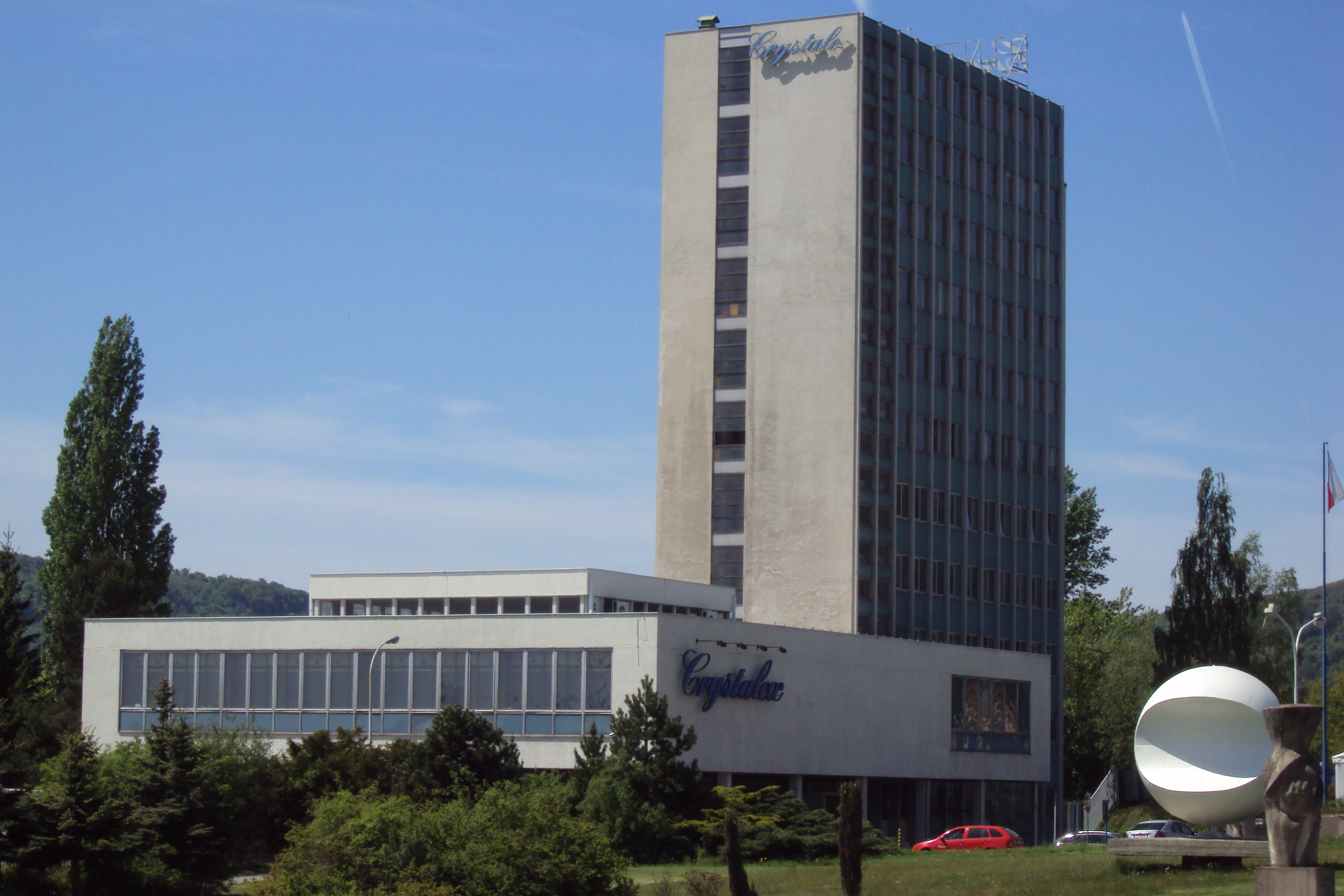
- Type: Společnost s ručením omezeným
- Founded: 1948
- Headquarters: Nový Bor and Prague, Czech Republic
- Revenue: 989 million CZK (2017)
- Website: www.crystalex.cz/en/

Crystalex is the largest Czech producer and manufacturer of drinking glasses. The company own the Bohemia Crystal trademark. The main production plant is in Nový Bor, the second is in Karolinka. Original Karolinka plant was built in the 19th century, when the greatest development of glass production took place.

== History ==
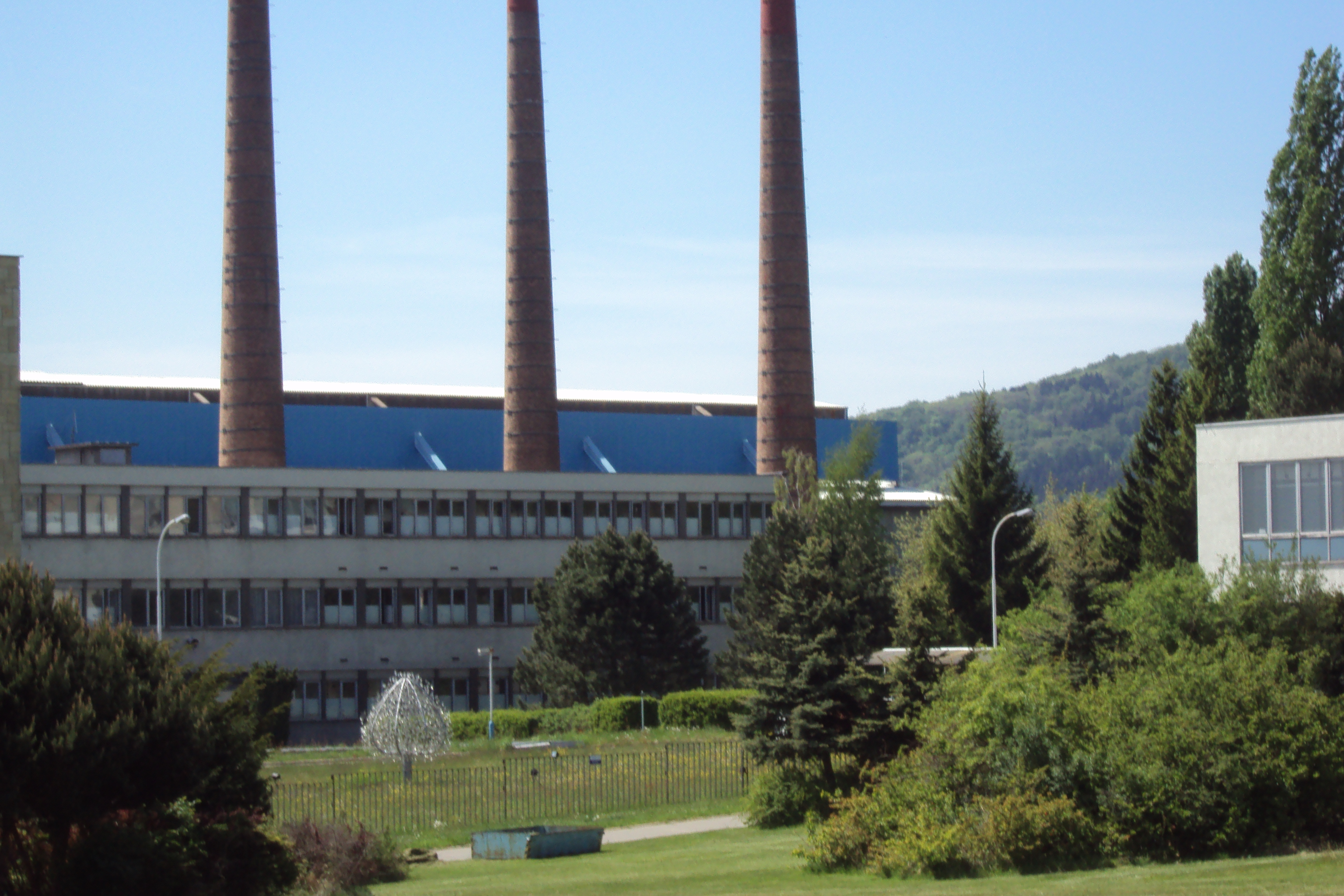
Crystalex factory

In 1948, the national enterprise Borocrystal was established, uniting 55 original small establishments and glassworks. In 1953, by joining Umělecká sklo was established even larger national company Borské sklo. In 1967, the construction of a new production facility in Nový Bor was completed, the construction was carried out by an association of Yugoslav companies. In 1974, the company changed its name to Crystalex. At that time, Crystalex united most of the Czech glassworks producing utility glass. After 1989, a number of state-owned enterprises became independent and were privatized. The company in Nový Bor was transformed into a joint-stock company.

In 2008, Crystalex had four production plants: Nový Bor, Karolinka, Hostomice nad Bílinou and Vrbno pod Pradědem and had a turnover of about CZK 1.5 billion. Then, however, during the 2008 financial crisis it went bankrupt. In August 2009, the CBC Invest glass group, backed by Russian and Slovak capital, represented by the Czech businessman Jiří Hudera, bought production plants in Nový Bor and Karolinka for CZK 362.7 million and transformed it into a private limited company. Since then, the new owners have invested another roughly 200 million crowns in the renewal of production and technology, as well as the modernization of the complex. Audition insolvency proceedings at the Crystalex ended after ten years. The company regularly reported a profit and sales were around one billion CZK.

== Collection and exhibition ==
A collection of 1,500 pieces of glass of the company has been exhibited since 2009 in the Lemberk Castle. Since 2011, it is exhibited at the newly created Center of Glass Art in the town of Sázava in the Benešov District. It is also sometimes borrowed to Nový Bor.

== See also ==
- Bohemian glass
- Moser (glass company)
- Nižbor glassworks
