= Moser (glass company) =

Czech glass manufacturer

MOSER, a.s.
- Type: Joint-stock company
- Industry: Glassworks
- Founded: 1857
- Founder: Ludwig Moser
- Headquarters: Karlovy Vary, Czech Republic, Karlovy Vary, Czech Republic
- Number of locations: 174
- Key people: Ludwig Moser, Leo Moser
- Revenue: ▼CZK 168 mio. (2020)
- Net income: ▼CZK -126 mil. (2020)
- Total assets: ▼CZK 208 mio. (2020)
- Total equity: ▼CZK -158 mio. (2020)
- Website: https://www.moser.com

Moser a.s. is a luxury glass manufacturer based in Karlovy Vary, Czech Republic (previously Ludwig Moser & Sons in Bohemia, Austria-Hungary). The company is known for manufacturing stemware, decorative glassware, including vases, ashtrays, candlesticks gift sets, and art engravings. Moser is one of the most collected 20th-century decorative glass and has been used extensively. From its beginnings in 1857, as a polishing and glass engraving workshop, it developed into a glass manufacturer that has lasted through the 20th century until the present. It is considered one of the most luxurious Czech brands and one of the globally known brands of luxury crystal. Moser glass is handmade.

== History ==
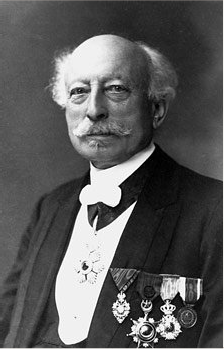
Founder Ludwig Moser in 1901

The original company Moser glassworks, founded in 1857 by Ludwig Moser in Karlovy Vary (called Karlsbad at the time), was a glass workshop initially devoted to polishing and engraving glass blanks. Later, the company began designing and making its own art glass products. Engraving blanks from Loetz, Meyr's Neffe, and Harrachov was performed by the workshop in the early years. At the Vienna International Exhibition of 1873, Ludwig was awarded a medal for merit; he was appointed the exclusive supplier of glass to the Emperor Franz Joseph in the same year. Moser won several awards in the coming years, including medals at the World Exhibitions in Paris in 1879, 1889, and 1900, and in the World Exhibition in Chicago in 1893. Ludwig took over a glass factory in Dvory (German: Meierhofen, now part of Karlovy Vary) in 1893 to create a full-service glasswork company employing 400 people. It was named Glassworks Ludwig Moser & Sons (Czech: Sklárny Ludwig Moser a synové, German: Glasfabrik Ludwig Moser & Söhne), where his sons Gustav and Rudolf also worked.

In 1904, Moser received a warrant to supply the Imperial Court of the Emperor of Austria and four years later became a supplier to Edward VII. In 1915, the company exhibited at the Panama-Pacific International Exposition and was again awarded a medal, which Louis Comfort Tiffany and Charles Tuthill thought well deserved due to the outstanding quality of the hot-glass applied decorations on coloured Bohemian glass. Art Nouveau glass pieces were produced by Moser with surface decoration with natural themes and simple cameo glass. They also used the Eckentiefgravur technique, employing a sharp angular body deeply cut in the form of intaglio flowers.

Following the death of his father in 1916, Leo Moser took over the direction, and the company expanded significantly, resulting in their recognition by a Grand Prize award at the Paris International Exhibition of Decorative Art in 1925. They also exhibited in London, Belgium, Italy, and Vienna. The Art Nouveau designs of heavily engraved lilies and the Fipop series from c. 1914 were some of the most notable pieces. Between 1927 and 1933, two American glassmakers made copies, calling them Woodland and Deerwood. Moser was one of the few Czechoslovak glassmakers to sign their pieces.

The depression of the early 1930s affected the company, reducing its staff to 240; eventually, Leo resigned from the company in 1932. Later, having sold their company shares in 1938, they fled the country after areas of Czechoslovakia were annexed. The city of Karlovy Vary was occupied by Nazi Germany in 1938 after the Munich Agreement, and the family fled the country during this anti-Semitic period. Because of its international reputation, the company was able to retain some independence during the communist era while the rest of the Czech glass industry was nationalised in 1948 (Crystalex).

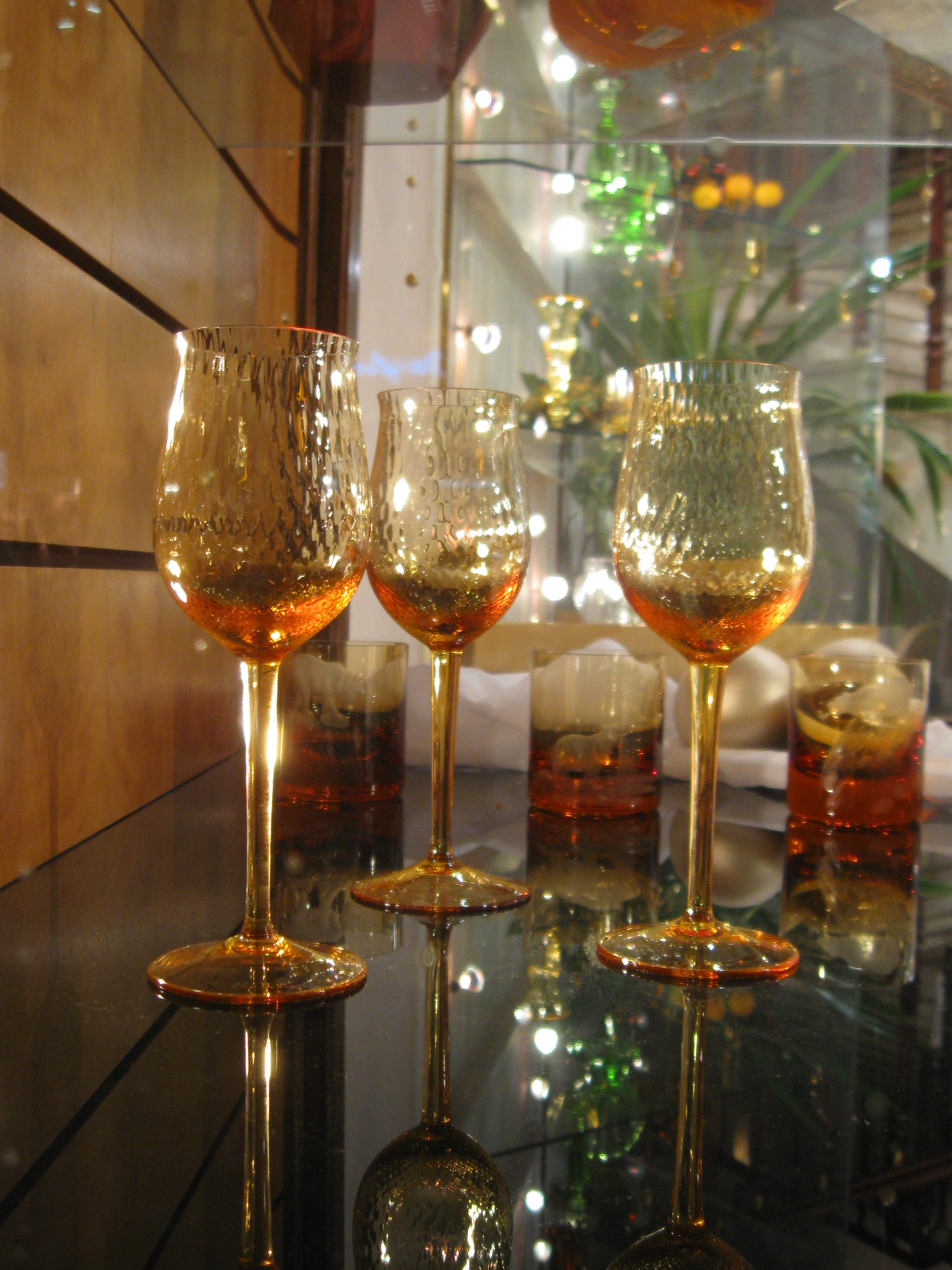
Wine glasses

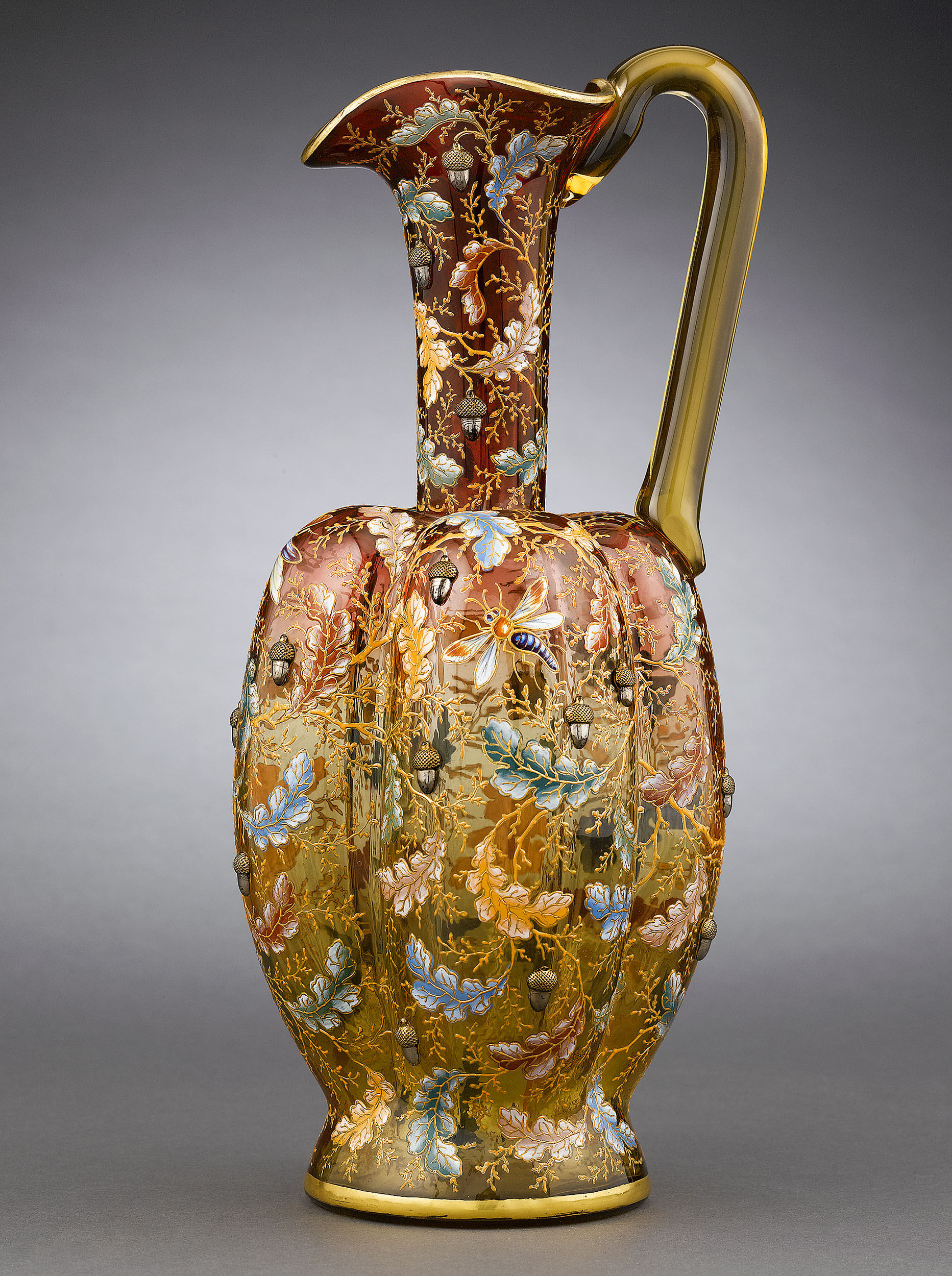
Amberina glass pitcher by Moser c. 1880

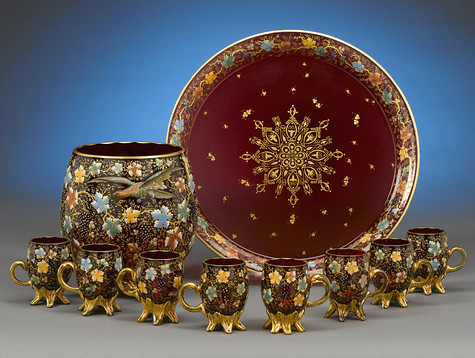
Ruby glass punch bowl set by Moser c. 1880

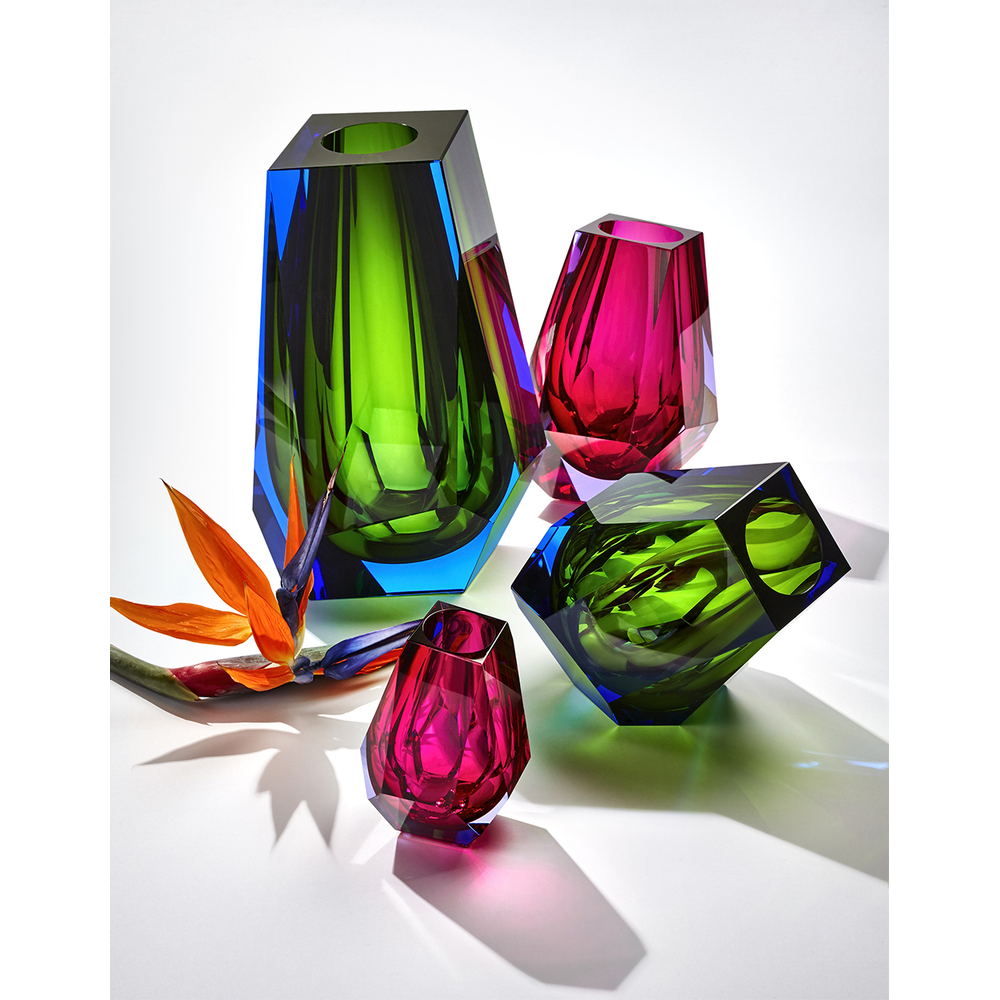
Pear vase by Lukas Jaburek

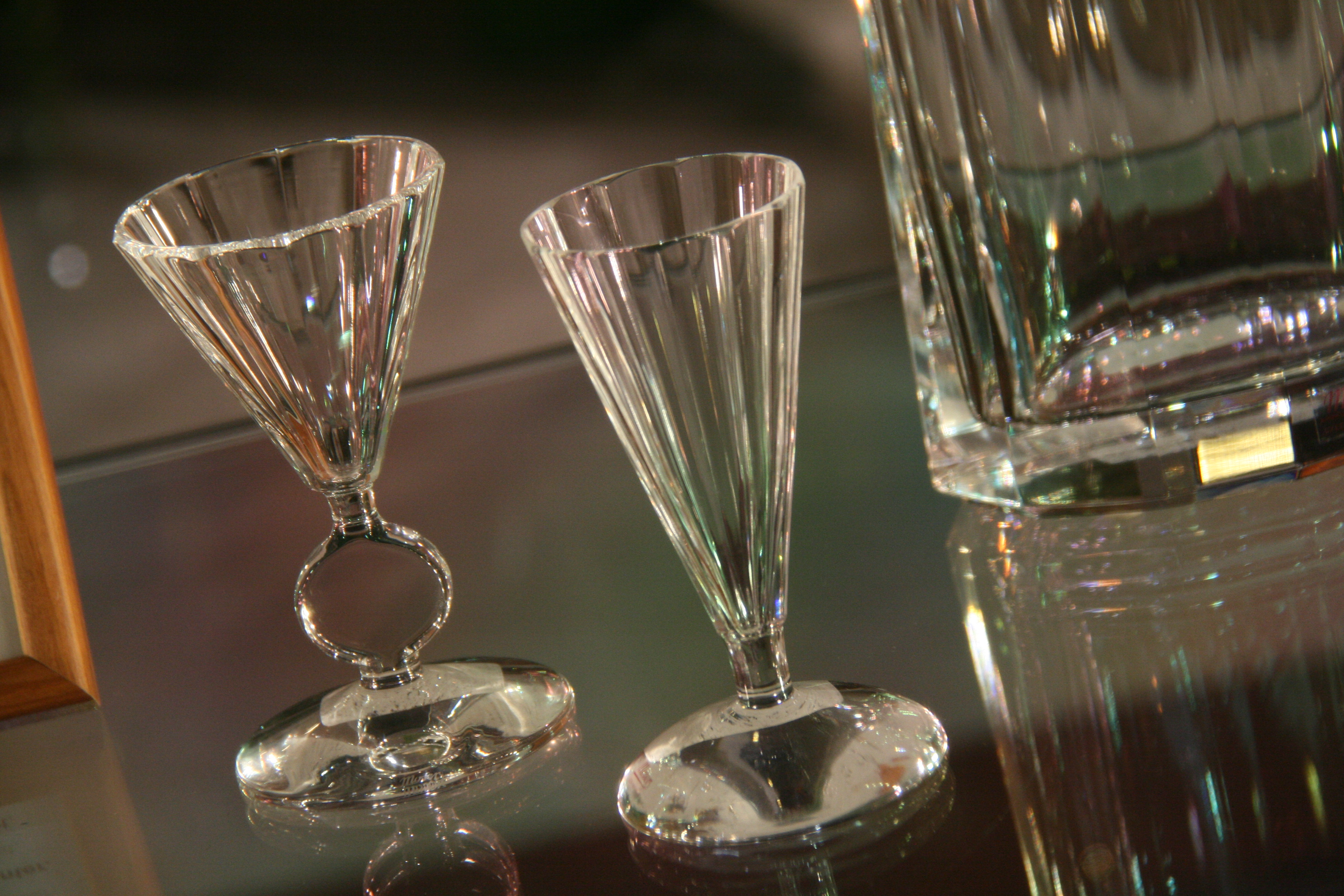
Glasses by Moser

== Glass of Kings and King among Glass ==
The slogan Moser—the king of glass originated in January 1869, when the director of the Vienna Museum for Art and Industry Rudolf Eitelberger, issued a certificate about the perfection of Ludwig Moser's glass. Its quality was also confirmed by the medal from the 1873 Vienna World's Fair. In that year, Moser became an official supplier of glass to Vienna for the Austrian Imperial Court of Franz Joseph I. He also supplied glass to the Persian Shah Mozaffar ad-Din Shah Qajar from 1901 and to King Edward VII of England from 1908. His later clients included Pope Pius XI, the Turkish sultan Abdul Hamid II, and the king Luís I of Portugal and his wife, Maria Pia of Savoy. Moser had established sales offices in New York, London, Paris, and Saint Petersburg.

In 1947, Czechoslovak President Edvard Beneš gifted a monogrammed Splendid set to future Queen of England Elizabeth II and her husband Prince Philip as a wedding gift. In 2007, on the anniversary of the Queen's diamond wedding, more cups and a bowl were added to the set, offered to the Queen by the Czech President Václav Klaus during an audience at Buckingham Palace. In 2004, the Splendid set was gifted for the Royal Wedding in Copenhagen. Thus, the nickname of the Moser glassworks spread to Glass of Kings and King among Glass.

== The Story of The Moser Glass Colors ==
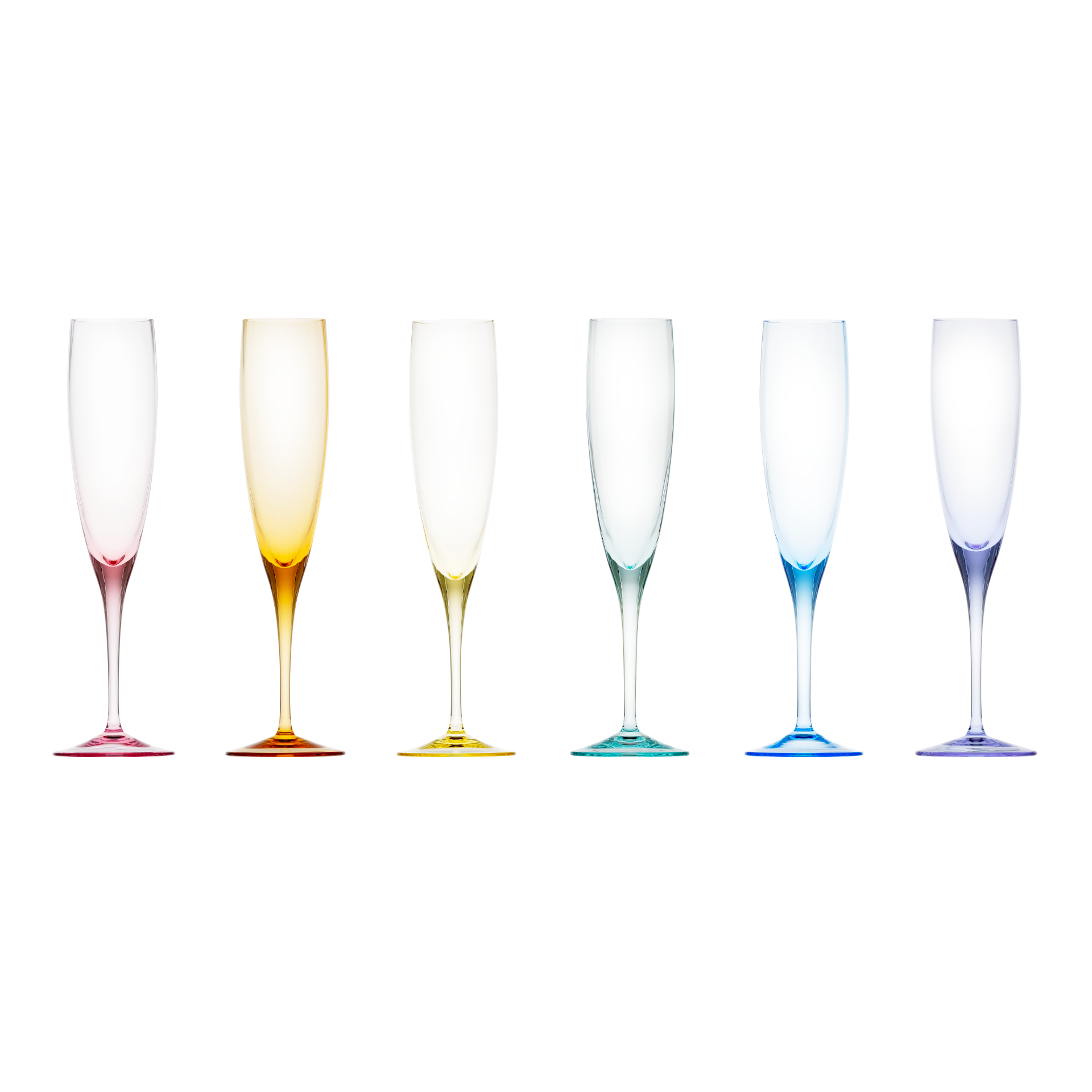
Basic colors: rosalin, topas, eldor, beryl, aquamarine, alexandrite

In the late 19th century, colored glass didn't play as significant a role in Moser's product range as they do today. Ever since Ludwig Moser founded the glassworks in 1893, its main priority was crystal glass. In Bohemian glassworks, colorless, clear, and hard potash glass was traditionally used, as it was particularly suitable for processing and decoration through grinding and engraving.

Colored molten glass began to find prominence in Moser's production with the advent of the Art Nouveau style. Partially green, violet, and sometimes orange, pink, or blue layered vases and goblets created backgrounds for deeply engraved compositions of plant motifs. A substantial turn towards the use of colored glass, however, came after 1908, when Leo Moser took up the position of technical director. He experimented with melting copper-colored ruby-red glass and, in 1915, showcased the first collection of thick-walled, heavy monochrome vases with regular facet cuts at the Modern Czech Glass exhibition in Prague. After 1915, he introduced basic glass colors into regular production; they were given attractive gem names—purple amethyst, dark green smaragd, brownish-yellow topaz, and cobalt-blue sapphire. In 1923, he added the yellow-green radium colored with small amounts of uranium compounds and, at the same time, black hyalith glass.

In 1927, Leo Moser's technological innovation and artistic sagacity, especially his effort to find a select and exclusive face for Moser's production, brought cooperation with Berlin's specialist in the area of chemical glass colors. The result of a two-year experiment and a series of test smelts was special, entirely new types of molten glass colored with oxides of rare earths (neodymium, praseodymium). These had a surprising quality: their color changes depending on artificial or daylight—Heliolite, changing from sandy yellow to green, purple-violet of Alexandrite, and yellow-green of Prasemite. Moser first introduced cut glass vases with a distinct color play at the Spring Fair in Leipzig in 1929, and in the same year, their names were registered as trademarks. A year later, Moser expanded the series with the purple-red royalit, and 1932 saw the entry of the golden-yellow eldor. In the late 1920s, Moser also began to melt the blue-green colored beryl. The company uses high-quality, ecologically friendly, unleaded crystal and exclusive glasswork, showing artistically progressive designs.

== Moser Glass and the Karlovy Vary International Film Festival ==
From the middle of the 20th century, the Moser Glassworks had a very close relationship with film and film stars. First, through the Giant Snifters, Moser glass found itself in their immediate vicinity. The set was gradually presented at the international film festivals in Cannes, Karlovy Vary, and Sorrento. Today, the glasswork's relationship with film and its creators has been confirmed by its partnership with the Karlovy Vary International Film Festival, which is annually attended by many artists and film buffs from around the world. Moser Glassworks is traditionally the exclusive supplier of the unique festival prizes, which have changed several times over the decades. The festival prize's latest look is from 2000, when the IFF team's initial idea was perfected by photographer Tono Stano. The prize, whose basis is created by Moser's glass blowers, also plays a lead role in the festival's opening shorts, which launch the film festival's programs every year. Winners of the prize for outstanding contribution to world cinema, for example, the directors Věra Chytilová and Miloš Forman or actors Helen Mirren, John Malkovich, Danny DeVito, Jude Law, John Travolta, Mel Gibson, Sharon Stone or Andy García, perform with it in humorous skits.

== The Giant Snifters Club ==
A crisis in the sales of luxury brand glass was averted by returning the shops in Prague and Karlovy Vary to the glassworks. The Prague shop was even left with its traditional name—Bohemia-Moser. The shop then became a means for trade with diplomats, the Chamber of Commerce, and government circles. Great credit for increasing the prosperity of the foreign trade in glass must go to the shop's director, František Chocholatý, who, thanks to his diplomatic skills, acquired many business and social contacts that the glassworks used for many years. It was here that the Giant Snifters Club was founded in the second half of the 1950s.

The founding of the Giant Snifters Club was a major social event for Moser glass. The inauguration ceremony involved choosing a snifter, whose shape matched the physiognomy of the future Giant Snifters Club Member, and making it 'dance.' Although the brand was patented in the 1960s, the tradition of the Club, which accepted important personalities of the cultural, political, and sports world, goes back to 1957, when the set was designed.

Members of the Giant Snifters Club are, for example: Whoopi Goldberg, former Japanese Princess Sayako, Robert Redford, Louis Armstrong and his wife Lucille Armstrong, former Spanish King Juan Carlos I and his wife Queen Sophia, former United States Secretary of State Madeleine Albright and former Czech president Václav Havel, among others.

== Today ==
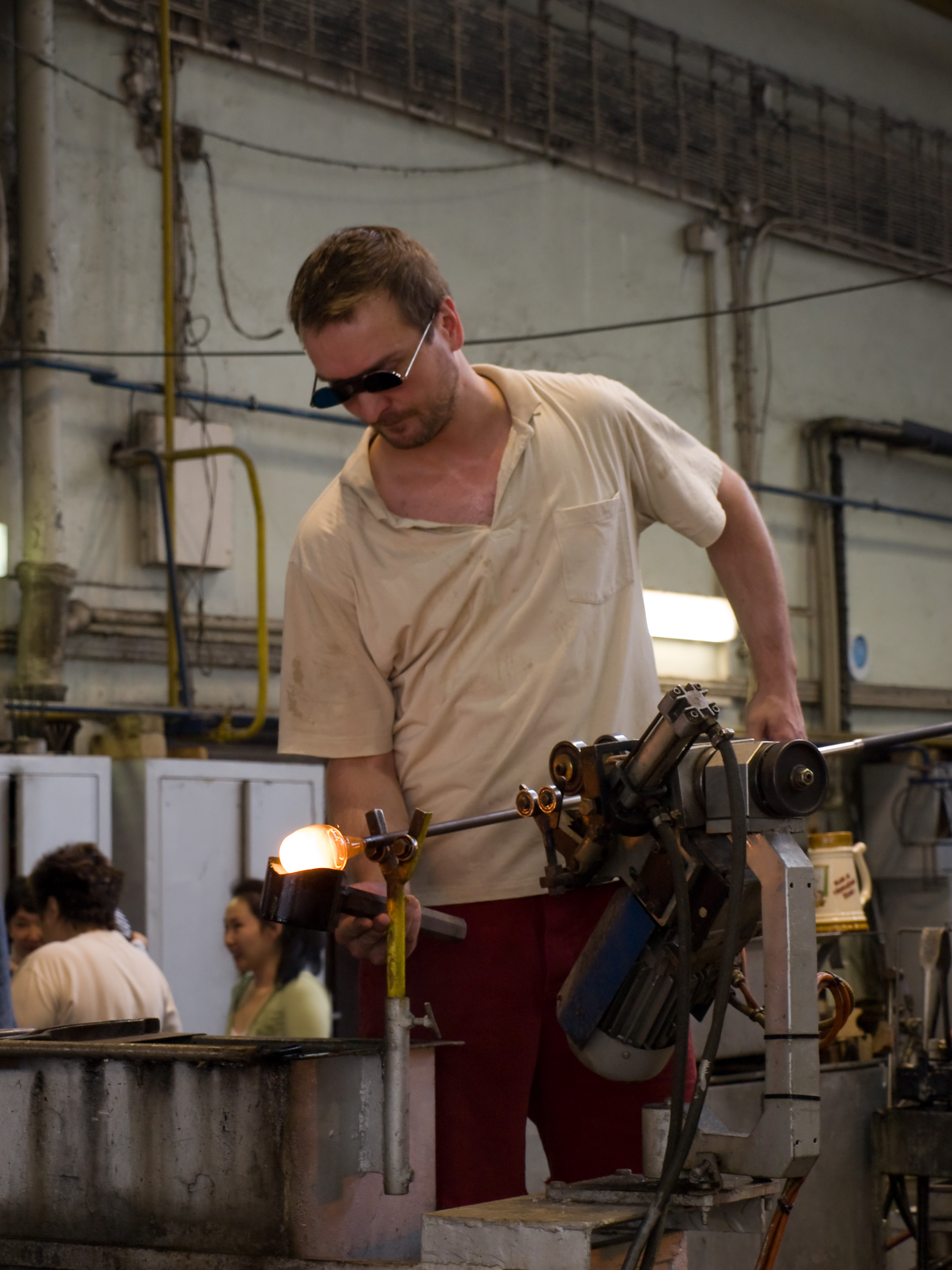
Moser glassmaker in 2011

Moser has developed a lead-free sodium-potassium glass that is more ecologically friendly than lead glass yet is extremely hard; it remains the basis of their products. Moser still produces some of its classic Fipop designs. A factory museum shows the 150-year story of the company in more than 2,000 pieces on display, supplemented by documentaries and audio guides. Besides having four retail outlets in the Czech Republic, two in Prague and two in the company's hometown Karlovy Vary, one of which is in the famous Grandhotel Pupp, and one in Dubai Design District, Moser has a worldwide network of retailers. Moser's US distribution company was established in Northern Virginia in 1957.

== Awards ==
The People’s Choice category of Czech Grand Design 2012, awarded by the Academy of Design of the Czech Republic, went to Lukáš Jabůrek for his design of the Pear vase. The artwork soon ranked among the bestsellers.

== See also ==
- Praseodymium
- Didymium
