= Preciosa (corporation) =

Czech company

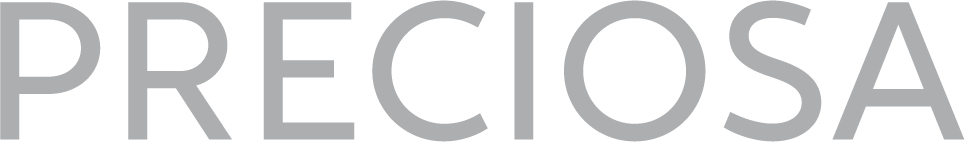
- logo
- Company type: Private company
- Industry: Luxury jewelry
- Founded: 1948
- Headquarters: Jablonec nad Nisou, Czech Republic
- Products: Lead Crystal
- Number of employees: 3100 (2010)
- Website: www.preciosa.com

Preciosa is the brand name for a range of cut lead crystal glass and related products produced by Preciosa a.s. of Jablonec nad Nisou, Czech Republic. Prior 1989, it was a harsh labor camp, nicknamed the Red Hell.

== Brand name and logo ==
The Preciosa brand name was first registered in Bohemia in 1915.

== Products ==
Preciosa manufactures a range of colored glass and leadless crystalline glass. Preciosa crystals contain approximately 30% lead to maximize refraction. Since 2013, however, Preciosa has also produced a lead-free crystal, known as the Crystal Faerie After Hours.

== History ==
=== Pre-Cold War ===
The history of glassmaking in the Jablonec region has been documented since 1548, when the Wander family founded the first glassworks in Mšeno. Afterwards, settlers from the Jizera Mountains began passing down the craft of glassmaking from generation to generation. In 1680, Johann Kaspar Kittel created the first necklaces made of Bohemian glass beads in Jiřetín pod Jedlovou. After refining the beads, Kittel sells them all over the Bohemian and Saxon lands, as well as establishing more trading locations. In 1711, the Fischer brothers brought the secrets of crystal cutting and polishing to North Bohemia. Four years later, they moved to Turnov. In 1720, two merchants, Jan Pacovský and Samuel Subitan, travelled to Austria, Hungary and Italy, further popularizing Bohemian jewelry from Crystal Valley. In 1724, the first factory specialized in manufacturing and export of crystal chandeliers was established in Prácheň near Kamenický Šenov. Bohemian chandeliers were ordered for the Royal Courts—Versailles and Fontainebleau palaces of King Louis XV of France, Sultan Osman III of the Ottoman Empire, and Empress Elizabeth of Russia. In 1743, Czech craftsmen created a chandelier in honor of the coronation of Empress Maria Theresa, which still bears her name.

By 1830, Crystal Valley glassmakers were creating around one million chandeliers per year, and by 1851, Bohemian crystals had developed both at home, with feats such as a six-meter wide chandelier, and abroad at the first World Exhibition in London. They were even honored at the World Exhibition in Vienna. Other noteworthy Crystal Valley products include the largest glass chandelier at the time, at ten meters in diameter, which was displayed in 1928.

In 1858, Josef Riedel moved to Polubný, becoming one of the most important glassmakers in Europe; in the 1880s he created an automated bead cutting machine, later patenting a machine to thread them. During the 19th century, Jablonec nad Nisou became the world center of the jewelry industry. The development of jewelry and glass companies, which were established and prospered in North Bohemia at the turn of the 19th century, was interrupted by World War II.

In 1945, the seven main crystal factories and 18 small firms in and around Jablonec nad Nisou merged, forming the Preciosa company, which was officially established on April 10, 1948.

=== Cold War ===
During the Cold War, Preciosa closely collaborated with the Communist regime. From the 1960s to the 1980s, Preciosa was an integral part of Věznice Minkovice, a labor camp set up by the Communist government in 1958, now known as one of the most brutal Communist prison camps in Czechoslovakia; it was even nicknamed "The Red Hell" or "Minkau" (after the Nazi concentration camp in Dachau) by prisoners.

According to a number of testimonies, Minkovice prisoners were forced to work in the Preciosa factory under inhuman conditions, suffering from lack of food, lack of breaks, unbearable heat, toxic work environment made worse by the lack of medical care, and they were constantly facing impossible work demands linked to threats of brutal punishment for failing to fulfill them, such as being held in concrete isolation cells for days and sometimes weeks. The profits of the Preciosa company under the Communist regime were thus due largely to the Communist prisoners' slave labour.

After the Velvet Revolution in 1989, in a less than transparent privatization process of the formerly state-owned enterprise, Preciosa was gradually bought up the Communist era manager of the company.

=== Post Cold War-present ===
In 1993, Lustry Kamenicky Senov Inc., the largest Czech manufacturer of chandeliers and lighting fixtures, became a daughter company of Preciosa–Chandeliers, Inc. Two years later, the subsidiary company Preciosa Figurky, Ltd. was formed in the Preciosa Group. In 1999, Preciosa released a diamond look-alike called cubic zirconium. In 2005, Glass closures began being produced in Desna. In 2009, the Jablonex Group divisions Glass and Beads joined with Preciosa Group to form a new company: Preciosa Ornela Inc.

Nowadays, Preciosa Group consists of the following companies: Preciosa Inc., Preciosa–Chandeliers Inc., Preciosa Figurines Ltd. and Preciosa Ornela Inc.

== Public activities ==
Preciosa is the main shareholder of the Czech football club FC Slovan Liberec. Preciosa was an official national partner of the FIS Nordic World Ski Championships 2009 and designed and made crystal trophies received by winners together with medals.
