= Vladimír Kopecký =

Czech painter and graphic artist (1931–2026)

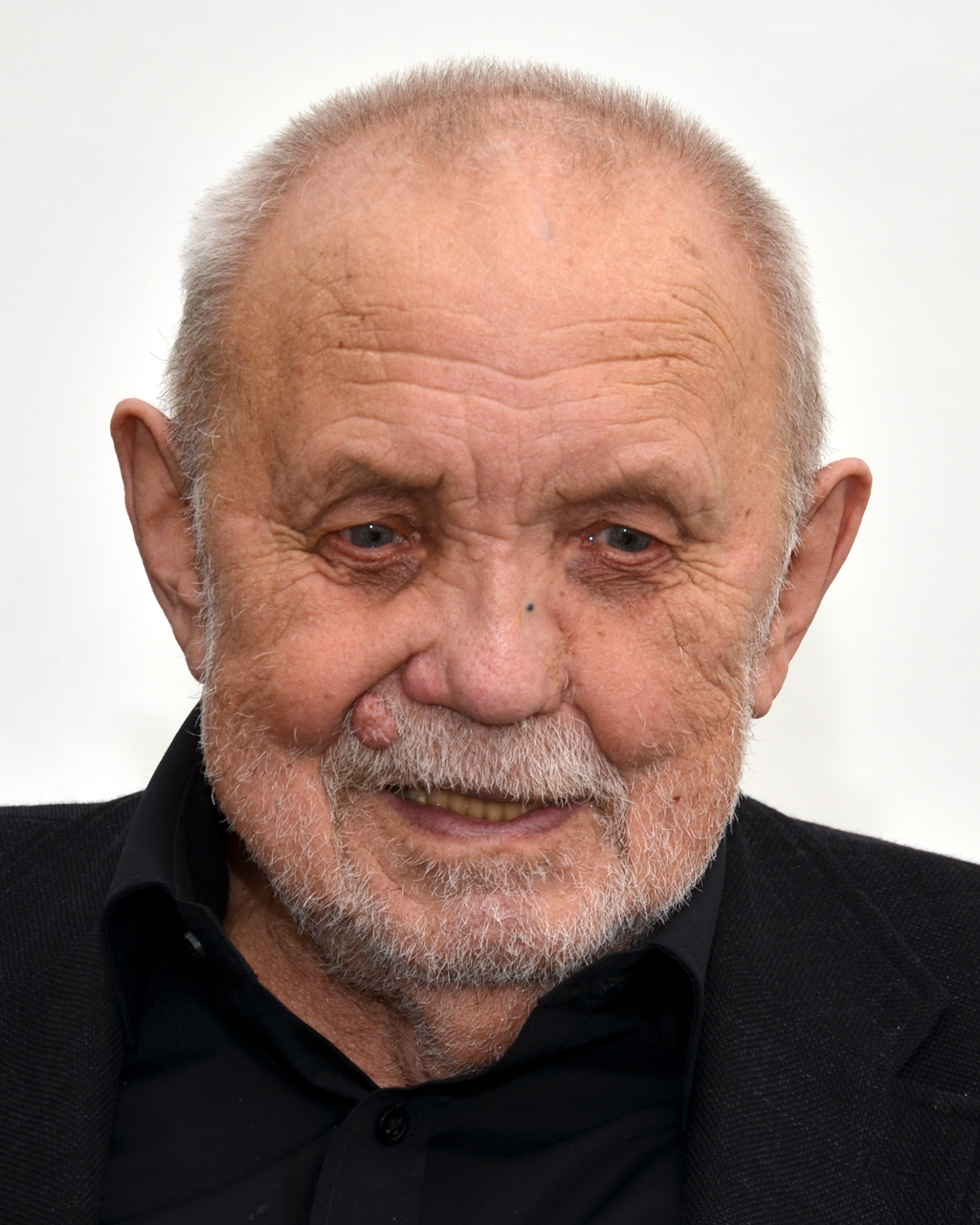
- Vladimír Kopecký (2018)
- Born: 26 November 1931; Svojanov, Czechoslovakia
- Died: 8 October 2026 (aged 94)
- Education: Academy of Arts, Architecture and Design in Prague
- Known for: painter, glass artist, university teacher
- Awards: Gold medal, Expo 58, Ministry of Culture Award for Contribution to Fine Arts (2008)

Vladimír Kopecký (26 November 1931 – 8 October 2026) was a Czech painter, graphic artist, glass artist and university professor. From 1990 to 2008 he was the head of the Glass Studio at the Academy of Arts, Architecture and Design in Prague.

== Life and career ==
Vladimír Kopecký was born in the village of Svojanov into a family of a seamstress and a carpenter. From 1934 he lived with his parents and brother in Uhříněves. From the age of five he wanted to become a painter, but at the end of the war the family moved to Děčín, where the nearest secondary art school was the State Vocational Glass School in Kamenický Šenov. He started his secondary school studies in 1946 under René Roubíček and Josef Khýn. Here Kopecký first became acquainted with glass and from 1948 to 1949 he continued his studies at the State Industrial Glass School in Nový Bor, where Stanislav Libenský was his teacher.

From 1949 to 1956 he studied in the studio of monumental painting and glass at the Academy of Arts, Architecture and Design in Prague under Prof. Josef Kaplický. In 1952, during his school practice in Lednické Rovne in Slovakia, he suffered a very serious accident when a grinding wheel broke while he was grinding glass and hit him in the face. He survived only by a miracle and underwent more than 20 plastic surgeries. After finishing his studies, he became a postgraduate student at the studio of Josef Kaplický, where he worked from 1958 to 1961, and then became a freelance artist.

He participated in the Milan Triennial (1957), the Czechoslovak Glass Show in Moscow (1959) and the World Exhibitions in Brussels (1958), Montréal (1967) and Seville (1992). He won a gold medal for his glass mosaic for the Expo 58 in Brussels (together with the artists Adriena Šimotová and František Burant). From 1957 to 1967, he created monumental stained glass windows in cooperation with Josef Jiřička's company - Art Glass Works (nationalized and incorporated into the Ústředí uměleckých řemesel). In the 1960s and 1970s he was mainly engaged in painting and until the end of the 1980s in designing glass objects for architecture.

In 1990, at the request of students, he returned to the Academy of Arts, Architecture and Design in Prague, was appointed professor in 1992 and remained there as head of the glass studio until 2008. His assistant was Marian Volráb. Kopecký maintained a very free atmosphere in the studio, which did not place any creative restrictions on the students. Kopecký's school at the UMPRUM, from which a number of prominent personalities came, followed Kaplický in promoting the general education of students, but consciously went against the "cultivation of glass" and placed more emphasis on the strength of expression.

Kopecký's first wife was the graphic artist Alena Kučerová. From 1991 he was a member of the art group Other Geometry and from 1992 of the renewed Umělecká beseda. Kopecký lived with his second wife Eva in Prague and worked in his studios in Prague, in Central Bohemia and near Karlovy Vary.

Kopecký died on 8 October 2026, at the age of 94.

== Awards ==
- 1958 Expo 58 Brussels, Gold Medal
- 1984 Glass 84´ in Japan, The Bridgestone Museum Prize, Tokyo, Japan
- 1994 Holst Glas Prijs, Galerie Groeneveld, Almelo, NL
- 2009 Ministry of Culture Award for Contribution to the Visual Arts
- 2013 Jury Prize, Main Prize for Serigraphy, Printmaking of the Year
- 2017 Prague 1 Municipality Award
- 2021 Hall of Fame, International Glass Symposium Nový Bor

== Work ==
Vladimír Kopecký's work is a permanent interpenetration of his essential painterly foundation and his distinctive use of glass in his artistic work. Already his early glass realizations in the form of thin-walled vessels bear abstract painterly compositions that enter the "third dimension" through transparencies (Vase, 1958). From the early 1960s onwards, he used painting to deny the optical qualities of glass, juxtaposing the prevailing decorative qualities and emphasis on the properties of the noble material with painterly gesture and boldness, demonstrating his inclination towards abstract art. At that time, he often shocked his contemporaries with his so-called "ugly glass".

In the artist's further works, a sovereign painterly line is constantly present. It can be divided into certain periods, but at the same time nothing is completely closed and the stimuli return repeatedly. It is connected in one organism with an unpredictable development scheme. Kopecký relies on his intuition, combining a geometric order with gestural painting. According to this veteran of Czech glassmaking, that's what life is like – illogical, incomprehensible and impossible to solve. The alternation of positions is based entirely on the mood of the moment and the simple desire to take a break from one form of expression in another. When compared to the American land art artist Robert Smithson, who is known for his entropic glass installations and minimalist plate glass objects, Kopecký's work is formally distinguished mainly by the expressive integration of glass and colour, which gives it vigour and richness.

=== Glass ===
Shortly after graduating, Vladimír Kopecký designed monumental mosaics (Expo 58) and stained glass windows (Expo 67). His work in the 1960s and 1970s was substantially influenced by works for architecture. The line of objects made of ordered flat glass interlaced with coloured foil or sandblasted, which he created from the 1970s onwards, is based on the principle of multiplied constructions and shapes (Planks, 1976). Their austerity has a calmness of precise order, but at the same time carries a coldness of lonely dehumanization. On each successive pane of glass, a geometric sandblasted segment is enlarged, reduced or displaced. Kopecký was the first to use this principle to create an illusive space and depth (Corridor, 1972).

In the early 1980s, he left painting for a time and created stained glass windows cast in lead. It was a period of seeking for a new expression, as evidenced by the titles I don't know, I still don't know, etc. This series ends with the large-scale stained glass Morning (1987), in which he integrated almost all available techniques. By the end of the 1980s, Kopecký's work with glass is an expression of the moment, and the works are created spontaneously from leftover paint and fragments (Afternoon Chair, 1988).

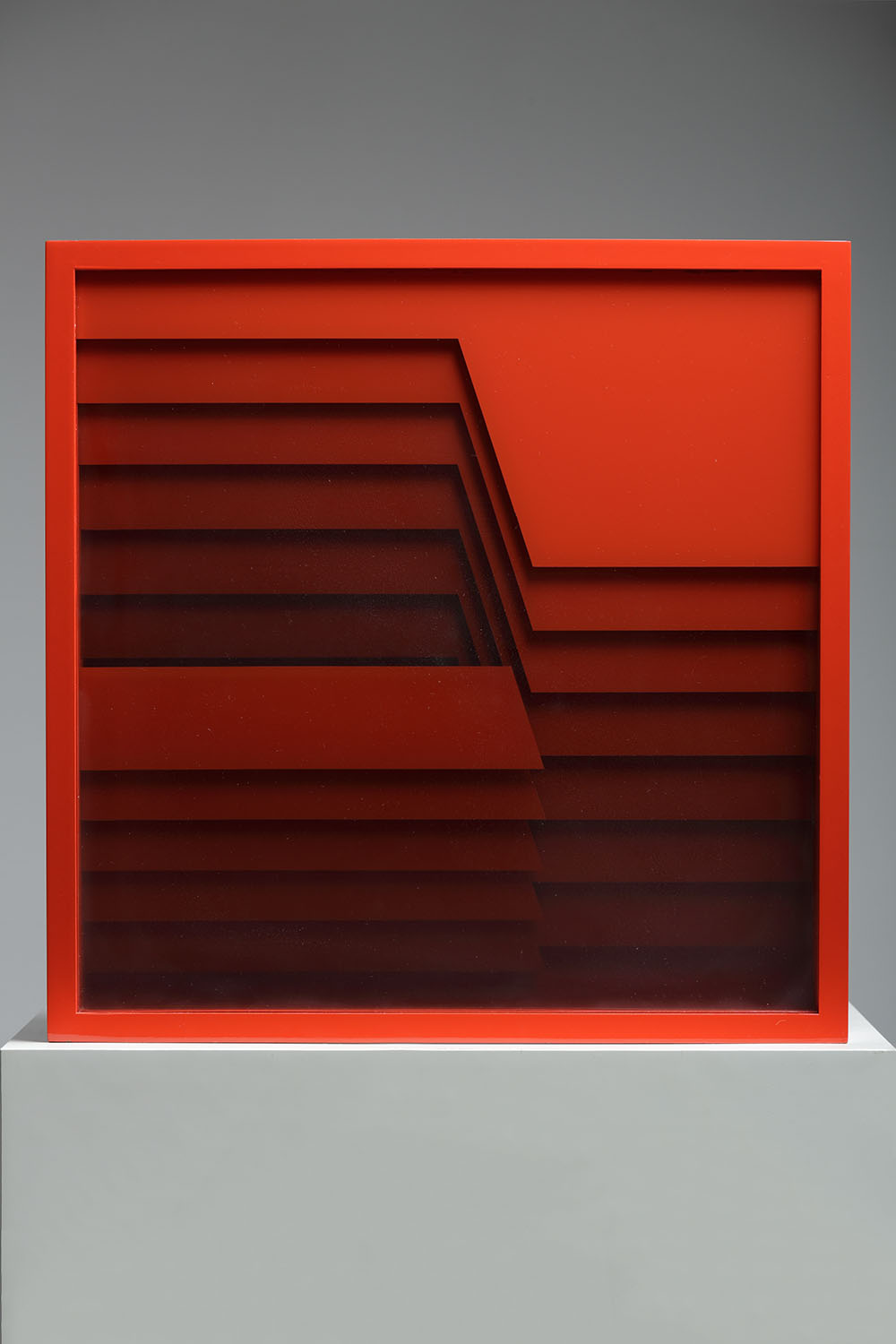
Vladimír Kopecký, Planks, stacked sandblasted glass, 1976

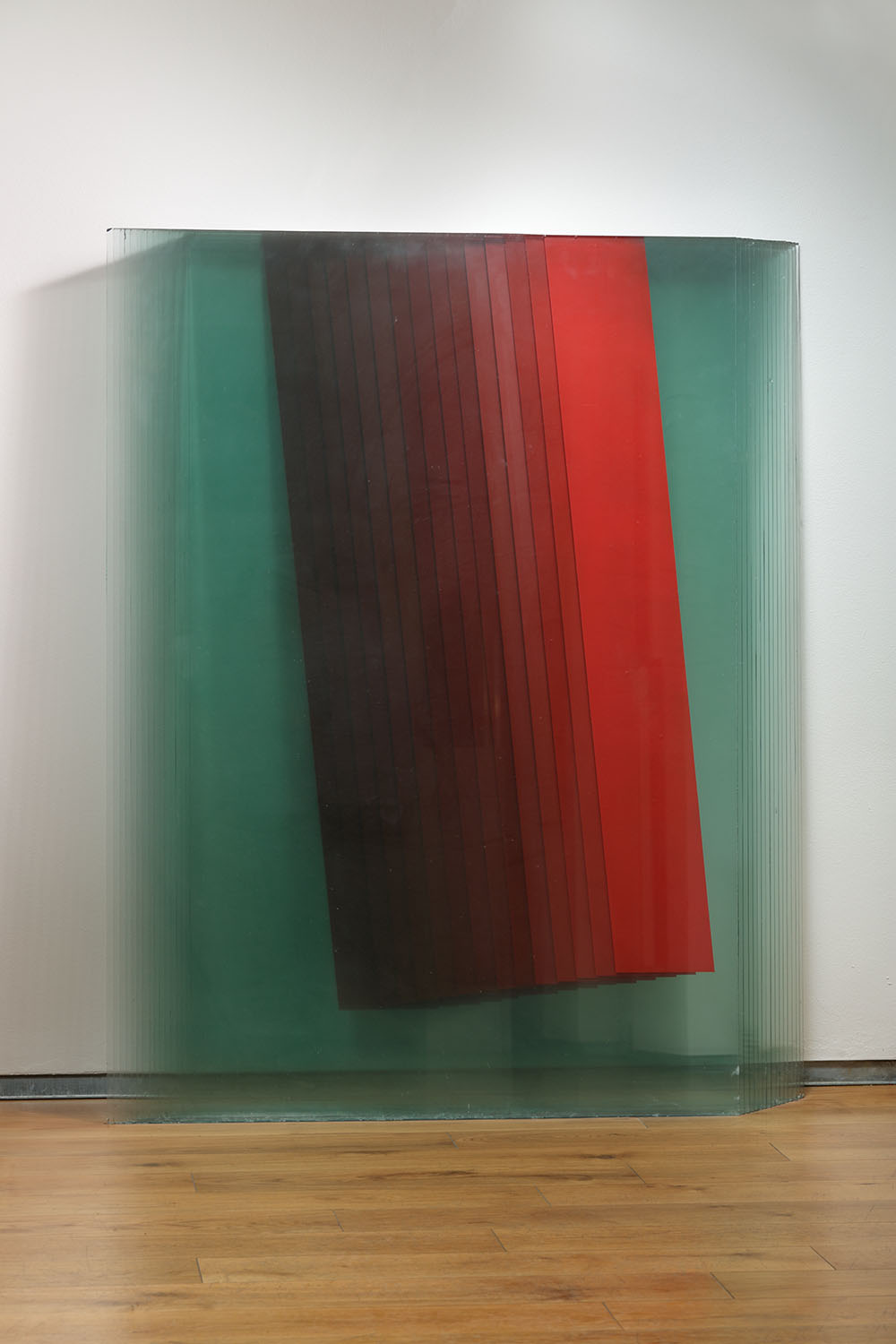
Vladimír Kopecký, Diagonal, stacked plate glass, 1982

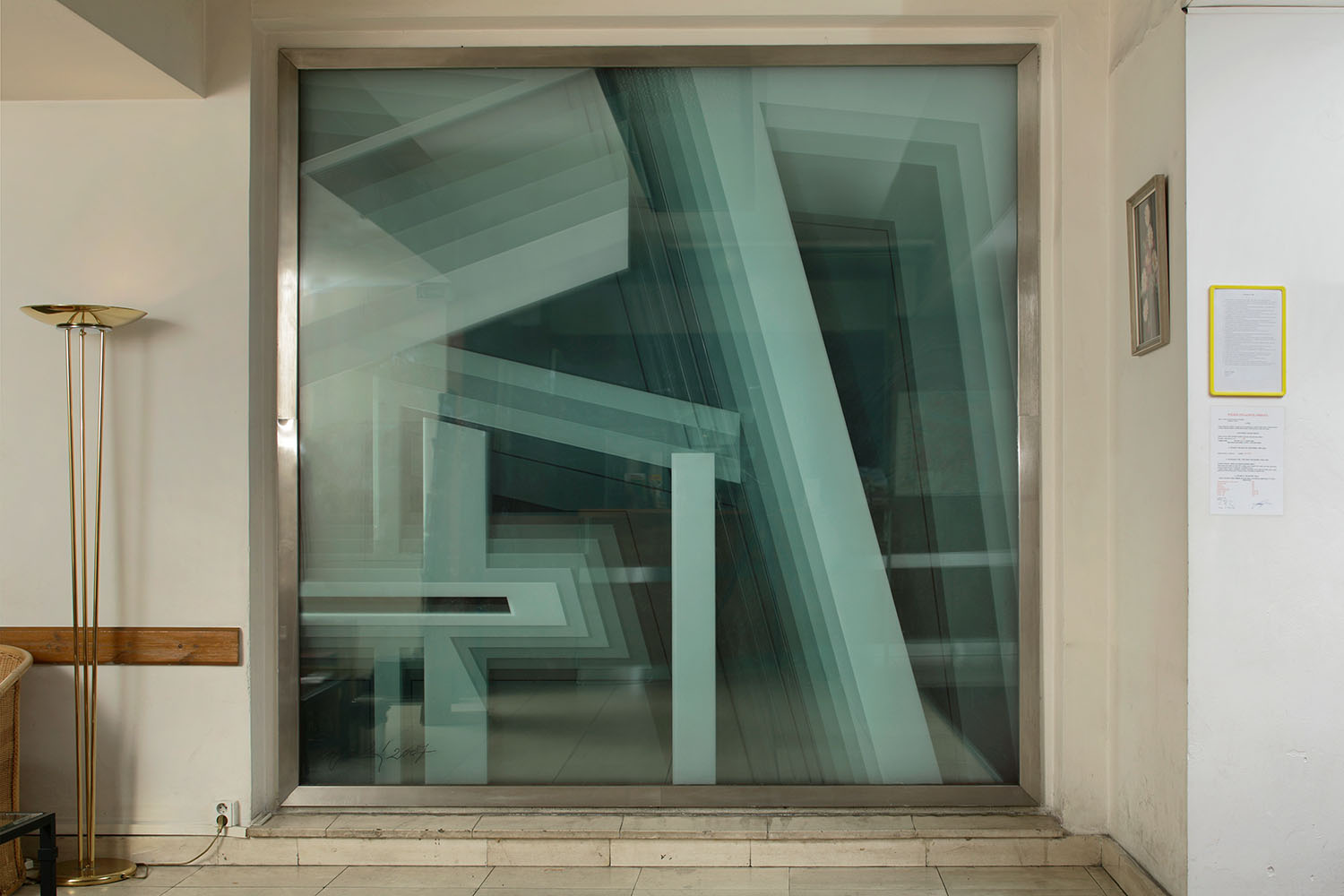
Vladimír Kopecký, Sandblasted glass object, Štefánik house (Legie hotel), Prague, 1989

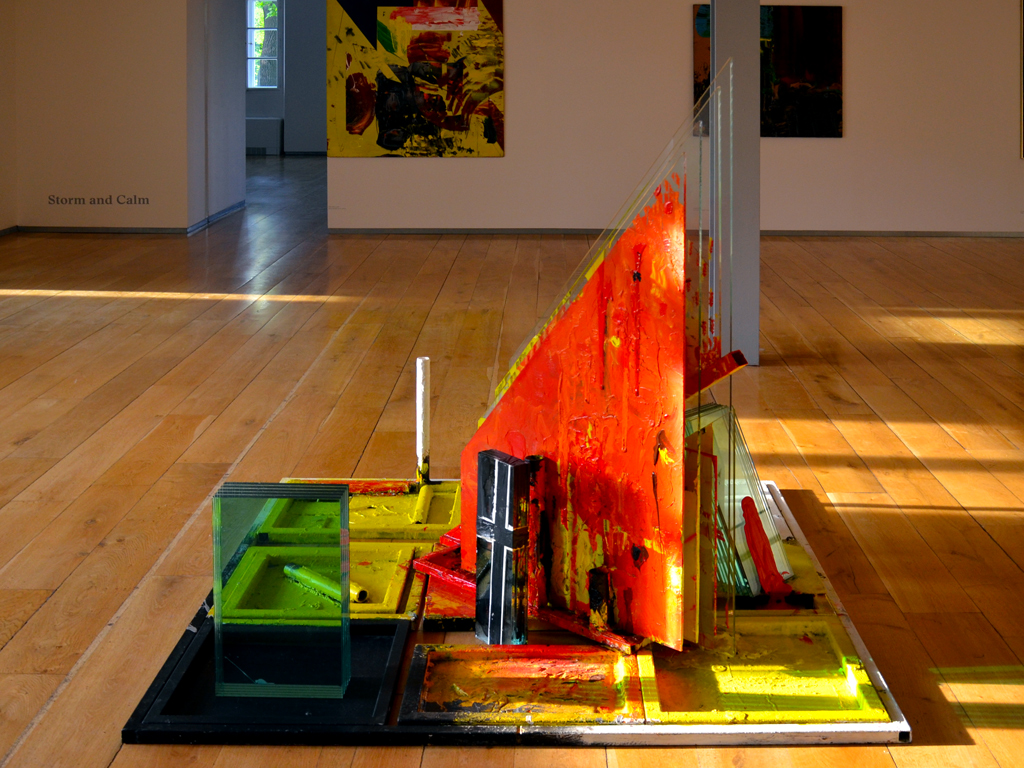
Vladimír Kopecký, Agony, 1993-2010

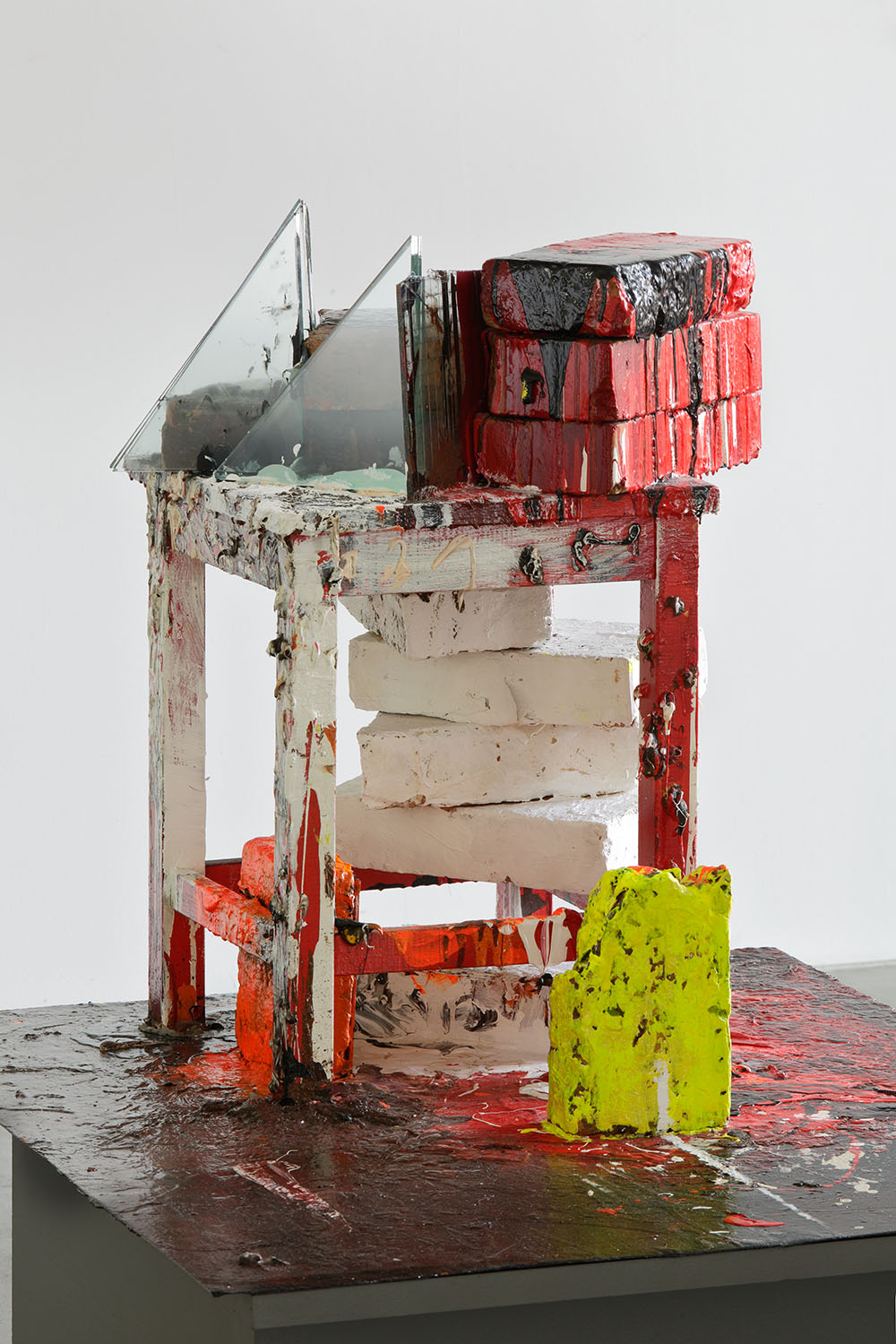
Vladimir Kopecký, Afternoon Chair, combined materials, paint, 1988

Alongside the disciplined nature of his geometric objects made of sandblasted plate glass stands a parallel direction of creation, which has combined glass and gestural expressive painting into one violent cry (Agony, 1993–2010). As the artist himself says: "I like absolute silence and the storm of the universe". In 1992, he created a monumental spatial composition of painted plate glass and metal measuring 2.8 x 11.7 m for the World's fair 1992 in Seville. The glass is stacked in a scrummage of panes and folded blocks that recall the frozen moment of a railway accident. It is covered by wildly colored drips, brush marks and hand smears. They are fading under the deposits in cinder-like structures, in bizarre patterns of trickling streams. The clear prisms lose their mass by blackening, as if they are sinking into a spaceless darkness. The object is a synthesis of creative endeavours and belongs to the highlights of Kopecký's work, but after the exhibition it was destroyed and preserved only in photographs.

Broken pieces of rails have become an important structural element of his installations. In his smaller objects, glass is sandwiched into a colourful whole with segments of rails, bricks or wood (Afternoon Chair, 1995).

Kopecký deprived glass of its tendency towards primary attractiveness by brutal intervention of colour, destruction and combination with other materials such as wood, cardboard and metal (Search, Space 3 event, Všemín 1986) In the installation in the Prague Castle Ballroom in 1999, where black colour dominated, evoking feelings of frustration and loneliness, the dangerous and hurtful sharp edges of the glass stood out from the black mass. Despite all the relentless attack, however, Kopecký's glass remains a material with a perceived essence of fragility and vulnerability.

His need for a permanent polarity is evidenced by the fact that, in a parallel posture, the artist allows glass to operate in the purity of a completely minimalist conception of a stereometric shape made of glued flat glass or in the form of multiplied curled shapes made of plate glass, with the implication of something tacitly symbolic between heaven and earth. They act as a counterpoint to his expressionist works, but develop the same human themes of spatial infinity, silence, anxiety and melancholy.

In the 2020s, he created a series of blown-glass objects decorated with abstract patterns made of colored glass enamels.

Vladimír Kopecký, Blown-glass object (Murano), decorated with glass enamels II (2024)

Vladimír Kopecký, Blown-glass object (Murano), decorated with glass enamels VII (2024)

Vladimír Kopecký, Blown-glass object (Murano), decorated with glass enamels III (2024)

Vladimír Kopecký, Blown-glass object (Murano), decorated with glass enamels V (2024)

Vladimír Kopecký, Blown-glass object (Murano), decorated with glass enamels IX (2024)

Vladimír Kopecký, Blown-glass object (Murano), decorated with glass enamels XII (2024)

Vladimír Kopecký, Blown-glass object (Murano), decorated with glass enamels XI (2024)

Vladimír Kopecký, Blown-glass object (Murano), decorated with glass enamelsXIII (2024)

Vladimír Kopecký, Blown-glass object (Murano), decorated with glass enamels XIV (2024)

Vladimír Kopecký, Blown-glass object (Murano), decorated with glass enamels X (2024)

=== Painting and prints ===
Similar principles of the encounter of opposites as in his work with glass, apply to Kopecký's painting, which was strongly influenced by abstract expressionism and action painting. From a methodically disciplined, geometrically spare or mysteriously veiled position of dehumanized constructions and buildings (Street, 1970, Labyrinth, 1979), he moves to expressive eruptions of colour and animality, to the destruction of the material and the disruption of the viewer's certainty about the notion of beauty. According to Suzanne Frantz, Kopecký's painting is the key to his entire oeuvre.

Kopecký was not a member of any artistic association in the 1960s and painting was initially a completely private activity for him. At his first solo exhibition at the Václav Špála Gallery in Prague in 1970 he presented himself as a painter and also in 1988 and 1997 he exhibited only paintings. He exhibited the glass for the first time only at his retrospective in 1999. The sadness, skepticism, embarrassment and despair that drove his work in the Normalization in the 1970s led to the necessity to control emotions with reason and to create a firm order in the image.

In paintings from the late 1960s and 1970s, the artist often chose patterned linoleum as a ground (Three Pillars, 1968). The multiplied decors of the floor covering create a monotonous background against which the painting makes an unsettling impression. The linoleum became the basis for a set of tachistic paintings of interior landscapes from the late 1970s and 1980s, but the predominant motifs are of prepared segments of buildings, structures and objects. They are not connected to the background, growing out of unspecifiable space (Chorale, 1974). The content of these paintings goes beyond the artist's fascination with the purity of geometric shapes and their composition. Behind them one can suspect a statement about the human condition and basic feelings of loneliness, dehumanization and doubt (Evening, 1970). The experience of creating geometric compositions from folded glass elements for architecture also inspired the paintings, which are executed with precise pencil strokes (400,000 Pencil Lines, 1969). The process of hatching itself, as a ritual of the will, gives way after many hours of effort to cause trances and hallucinations.

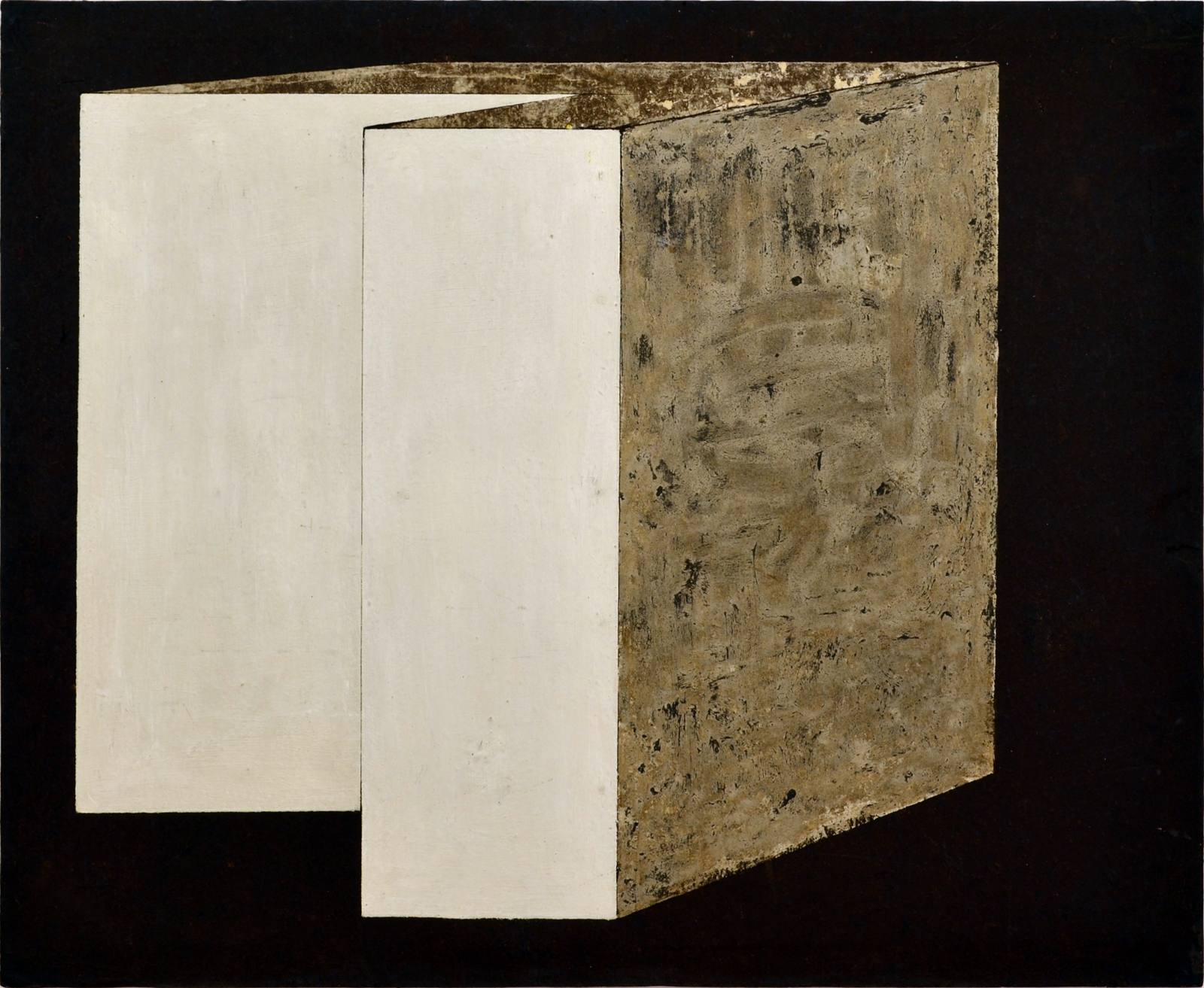
Vladimír Kopecký, Alone, 1969

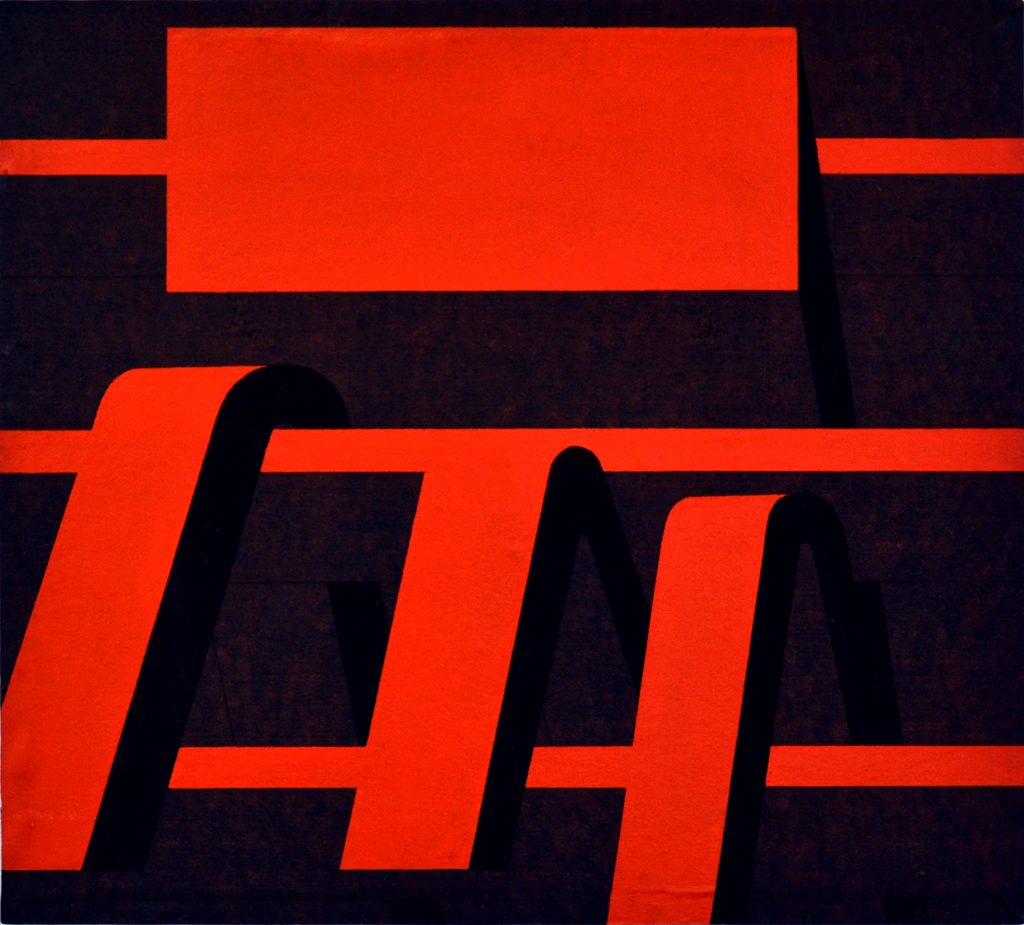
Vladimír Kopecký, Evening, 1970

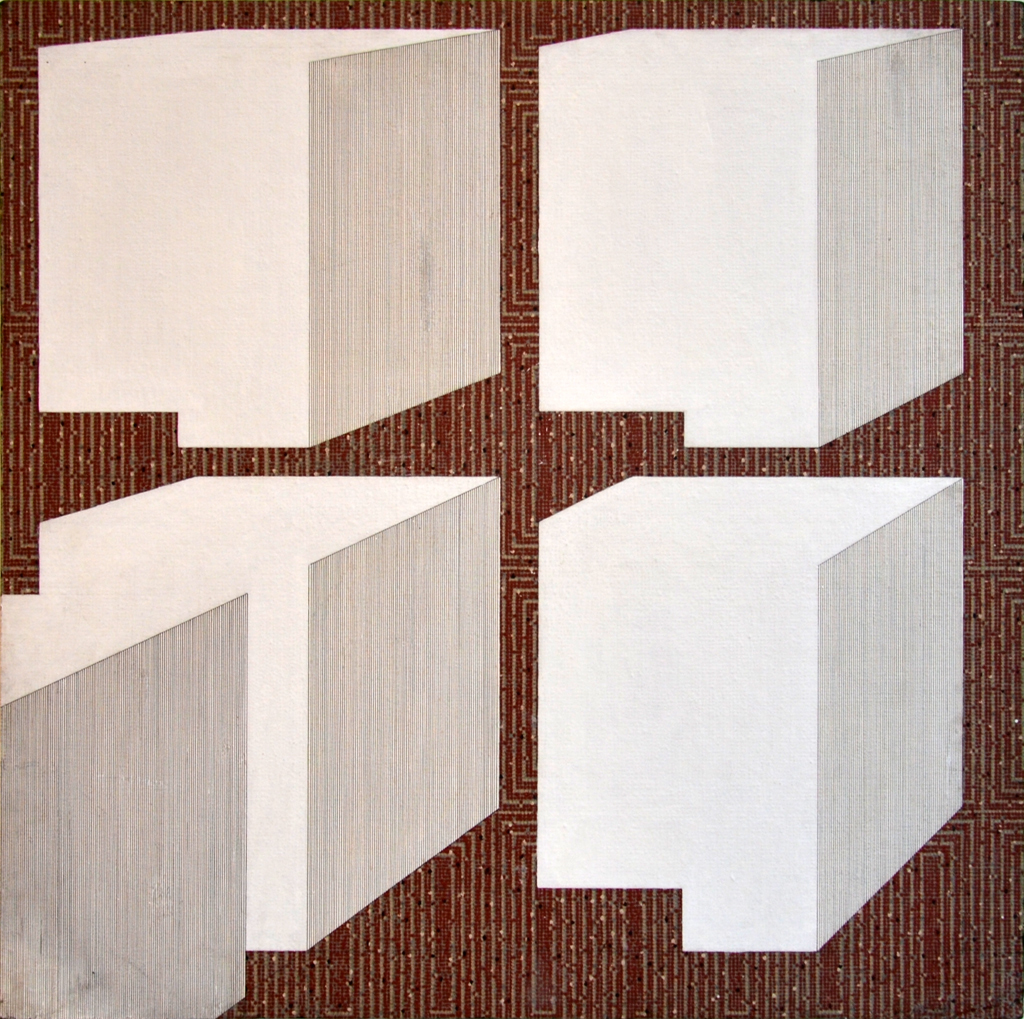
Vladimír-Kopecký, The Street, 1972

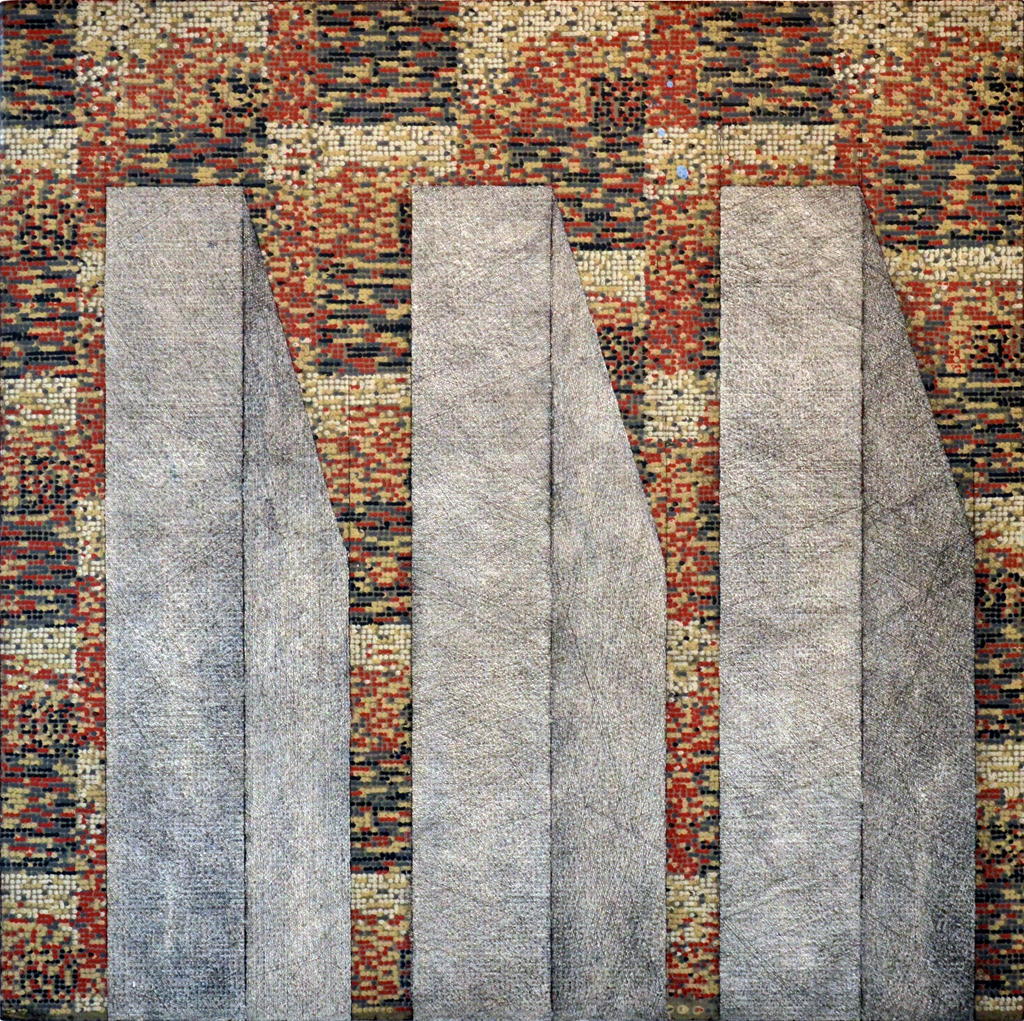
Vladimír Kopecký, Three Pillars, 1968

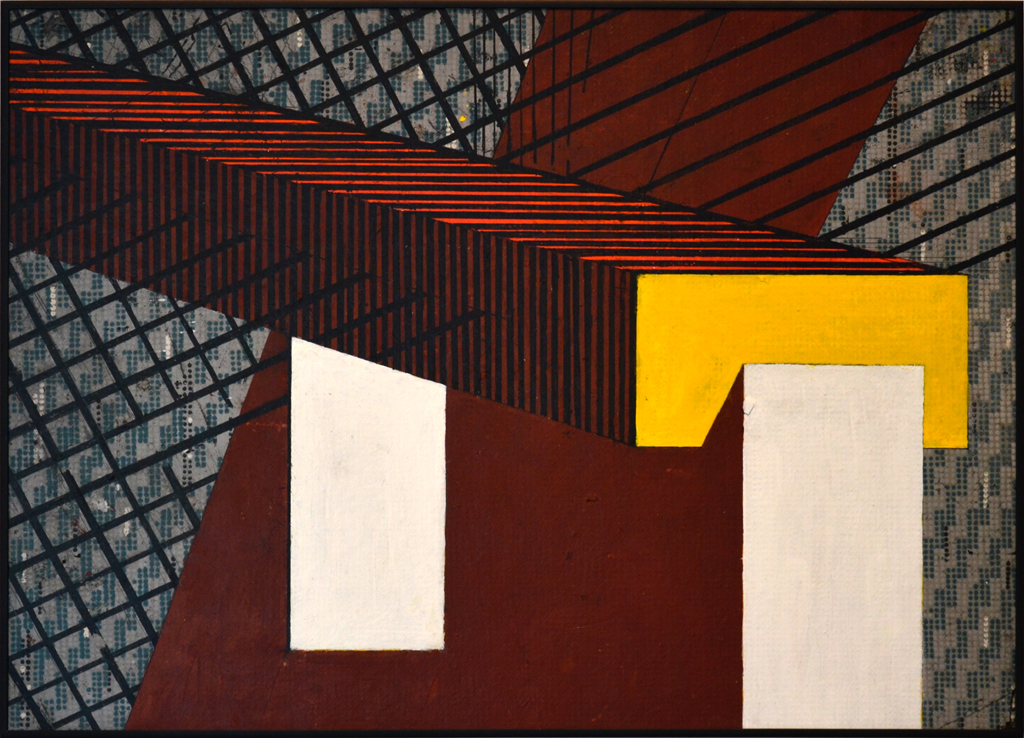
Vladimír Kopecký, Hymn, 1974

From the 1980s onwards, a completely relaxed position of action painting began to prevail in the artist's work. Colours are applied to the canvas in massive layers, dripping, and are disrupted by the intervention of various tools (Suburbs, 2001, Thousands of Wings, 2010). Often segments of cut plate glass are applied to the surface of the painting, but also destroyed tangles of various materials. The paintings eloquently document the fact that Vladimír Kopecký finds the experience and the most intrinsic sense of artistic activity in the vividly dramatic process of creation itself, which brutally breaks down the boundaries of the viewer's general idea of the rules of painting (Beasts, 1988, Ghosts, 2013). The compositions are not directed towards the effect of a spectacular result, they do not depict or lead to intricately coded symbolic messages. Above all, they breathe with vigour and intoxication from the freedom of working with colour and represent a pure outpouring of emotion. The artist is a rare solitaire in this field, his work providing an opportunity to authentically experience the fascination of unrestrained energy. However, there is nothing dualistic in Vladimír Kopecký's work; there is no contradiction between order and chaos. Its most distinctive characteristic is inner freedom and the constant exploration of the visual effect.

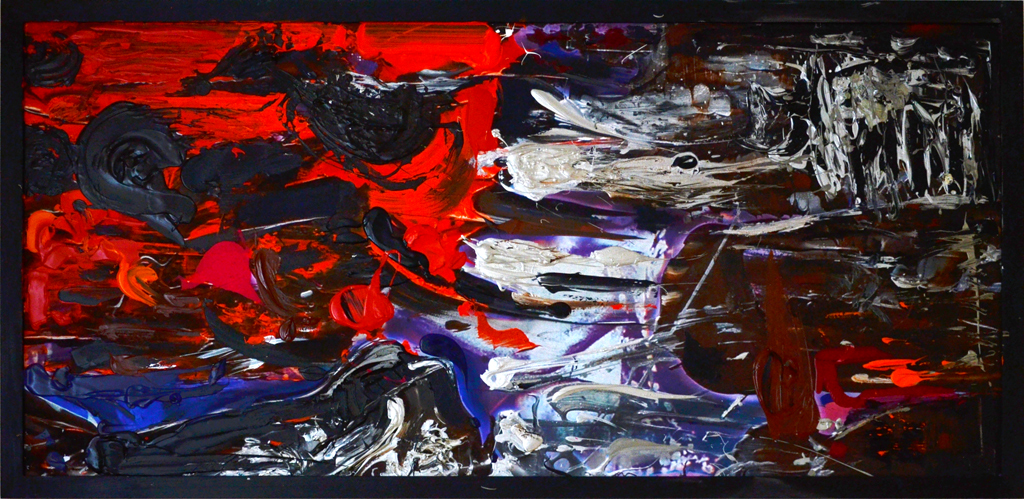
Vladimír Kopecký, Flame Out, 2013

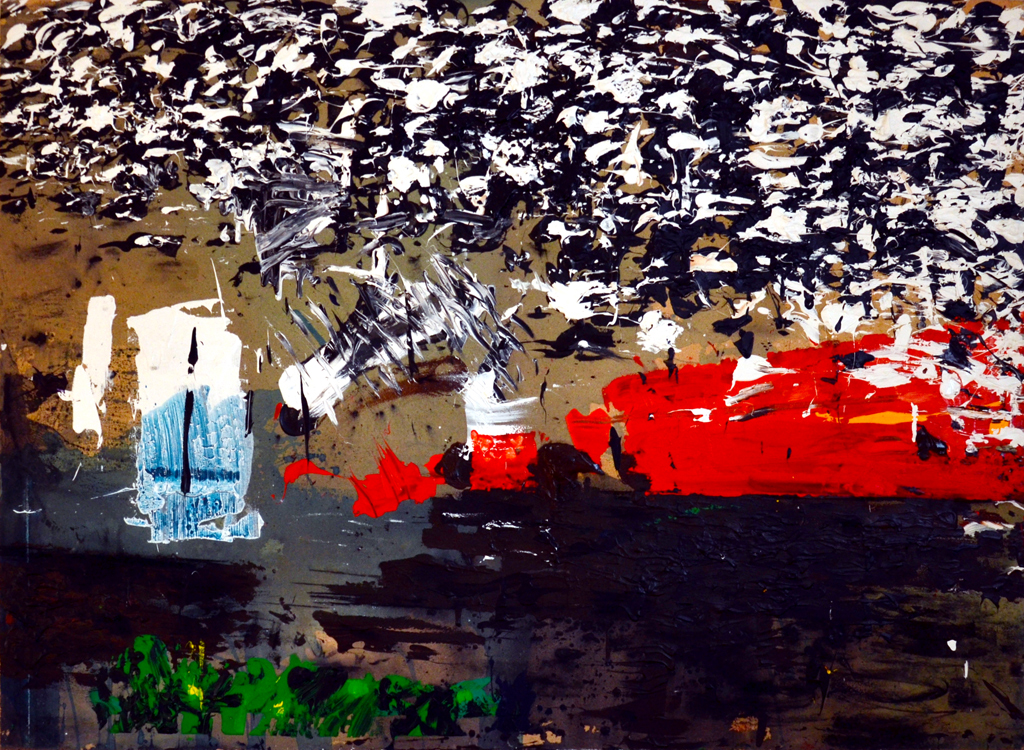
Vladimír Kopecký, Thousands of Wings, 2010

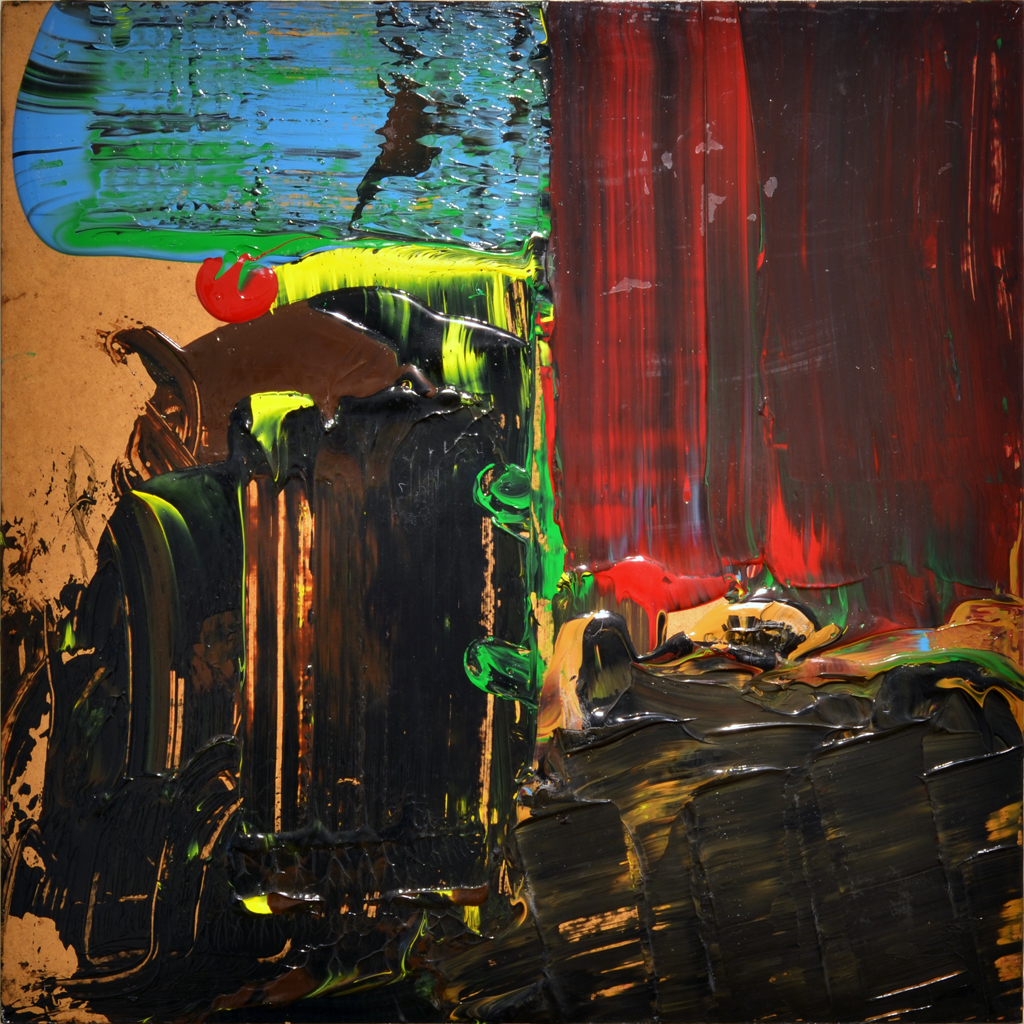
Vladimír Kopecký, Swamp of Fierce Memory, 2012

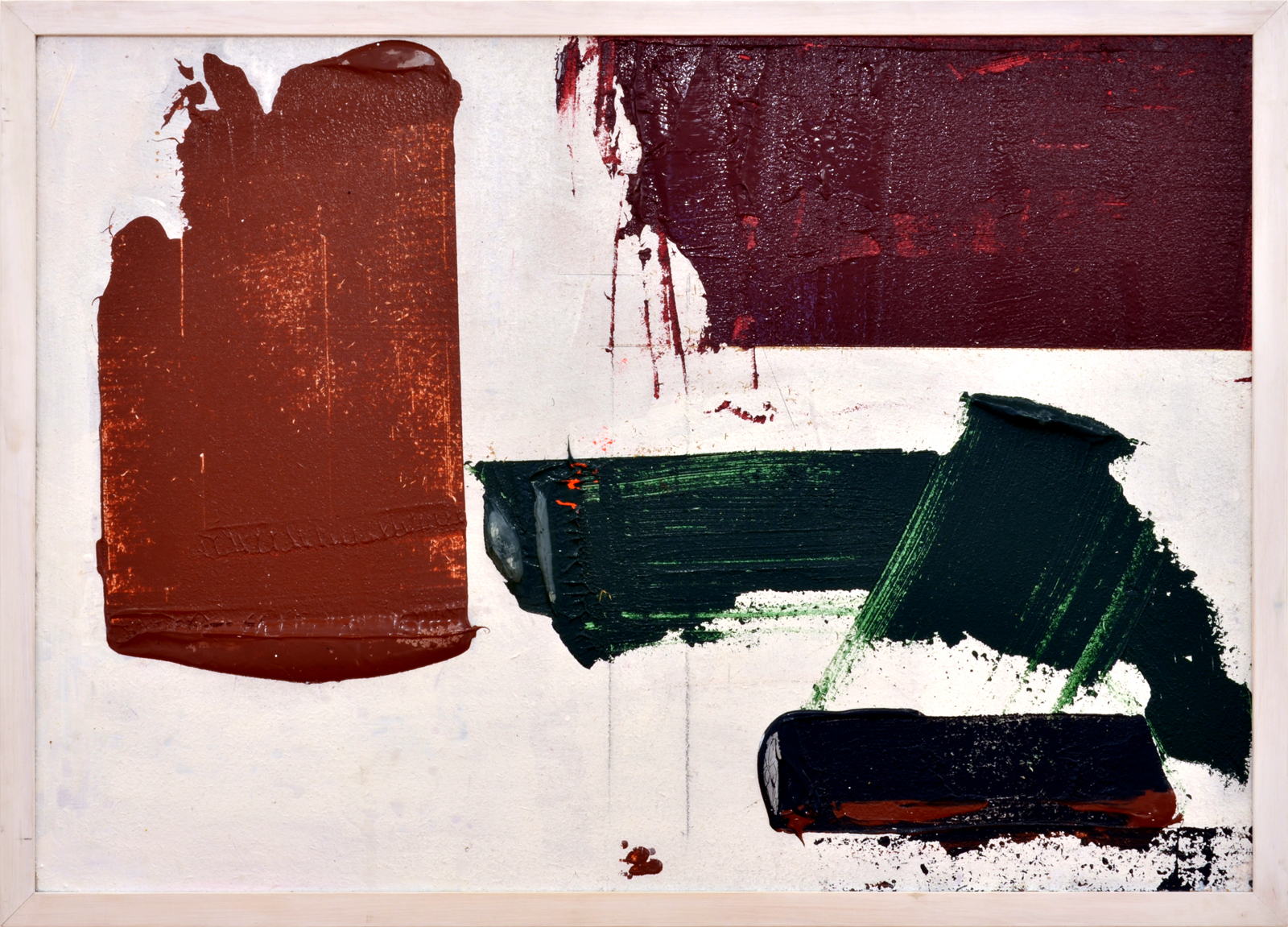
Vladimír Kopecký, Crescendo, 2012

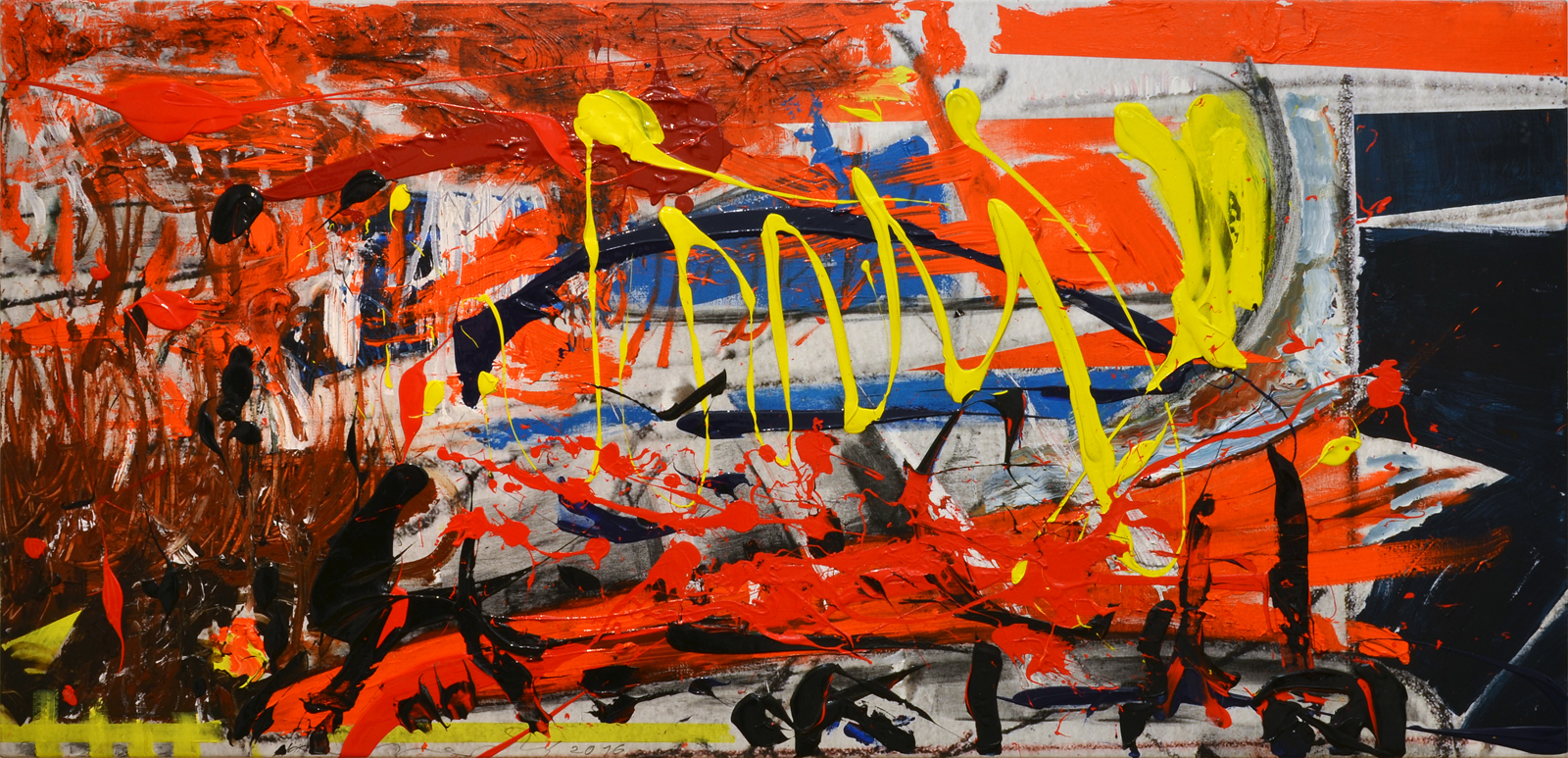
Vladimír Kopecký, Ballistarius, 2016

An interesting position of the artist after 2010 are his screen prints, in which he has projected the personal principle of the necessity of alternating opposing positions. Precise linear structures repeat motifs of paintings with constructions in a more artificial and flat form, but there are also apparently intoxicating games with the machine-precise multiplication of rounded lines and their optical illusions (Very Pleasant Shape, 2014). As a counterpoint to the streams and layers of colour in his abstract expressionist paintings, they have a new and refreshing look.

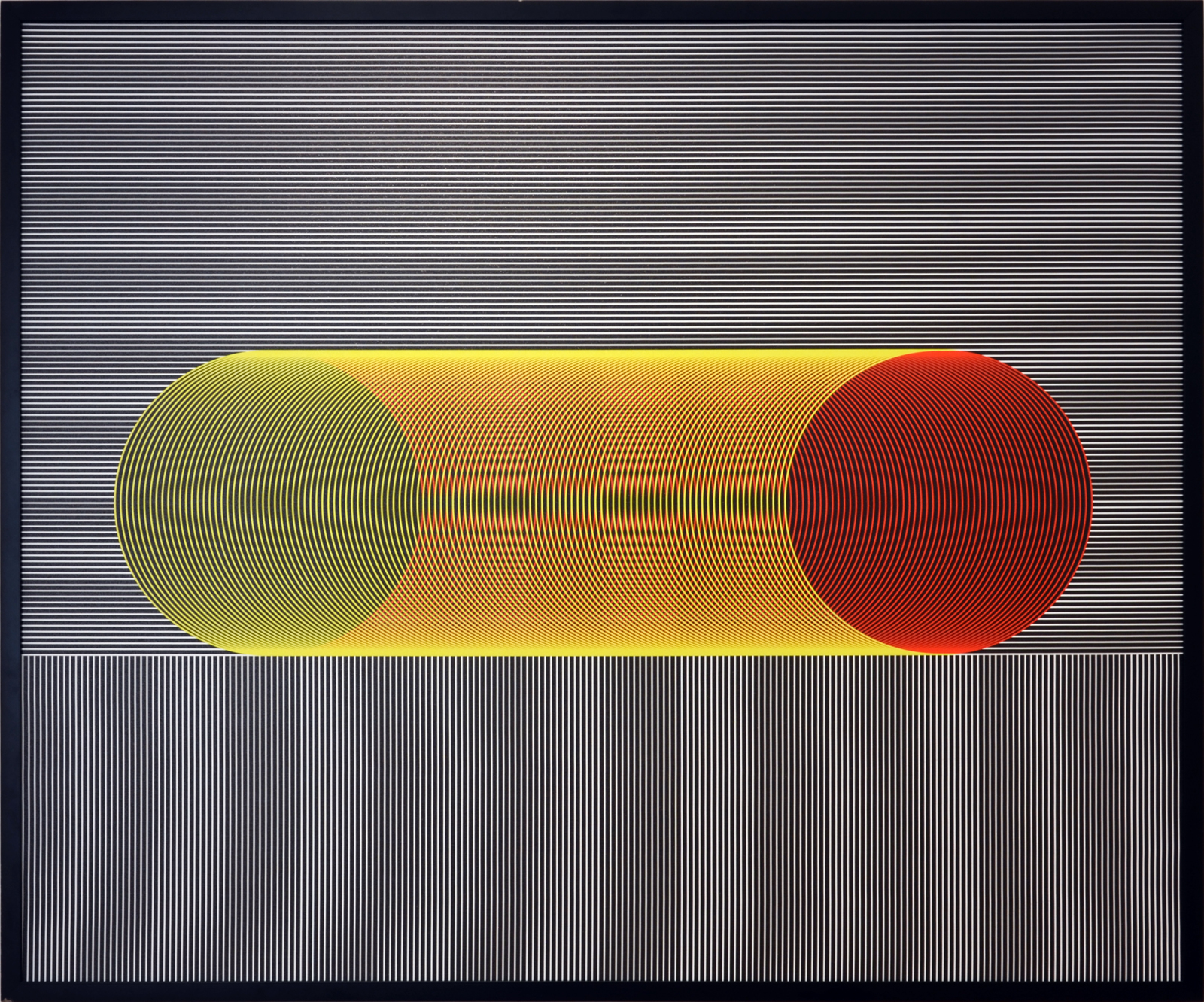
Vladimír-Kopecký, Upper Galaxy, 2013

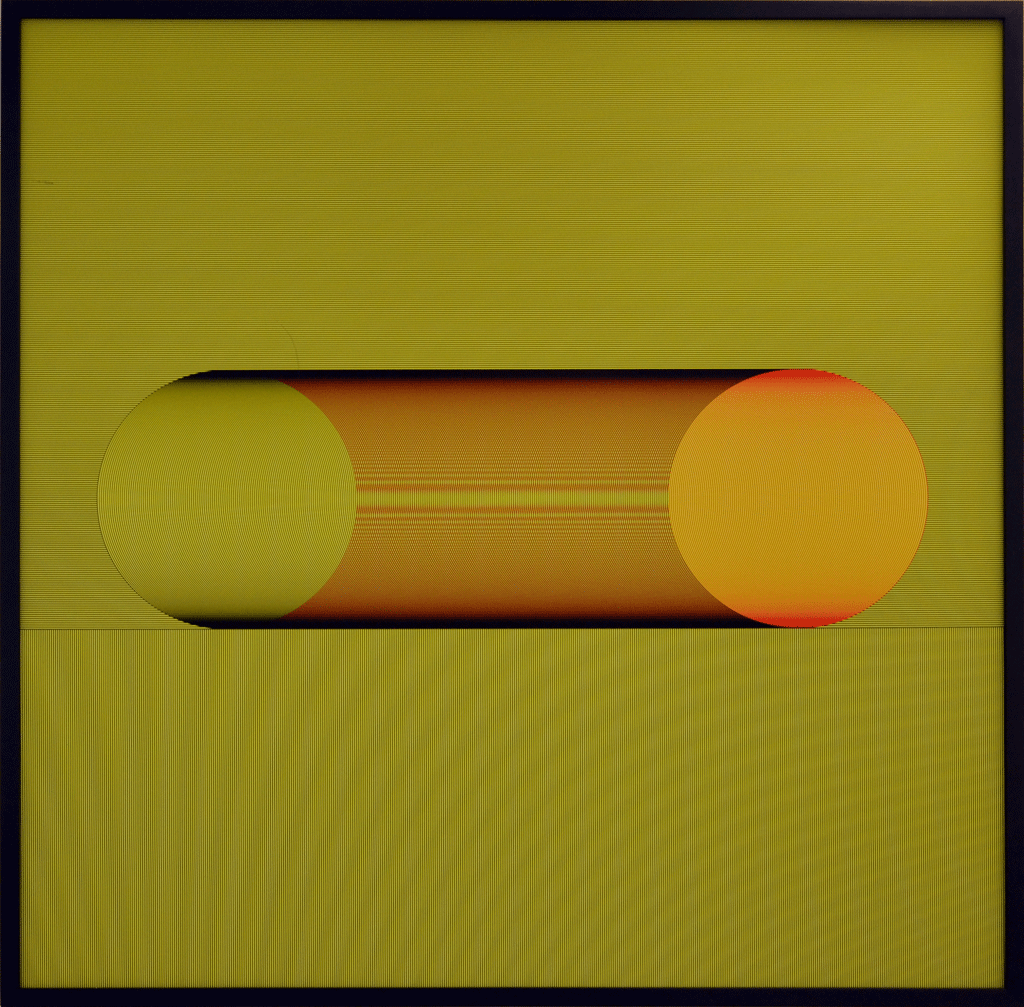
Vladimír-Kopecký, Upper Galaxy, 2014

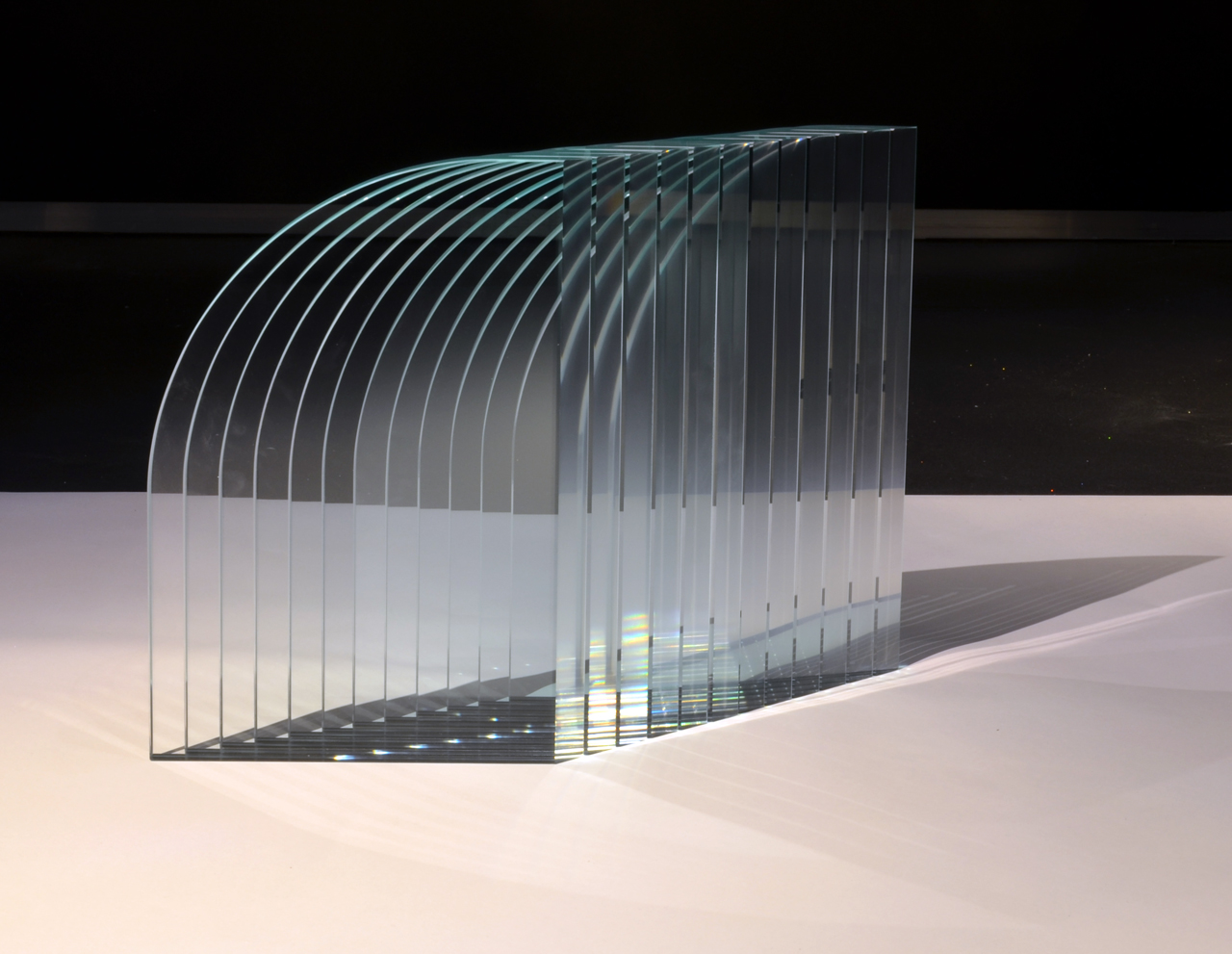
Vladimír Kopecký, Parabol, 2006

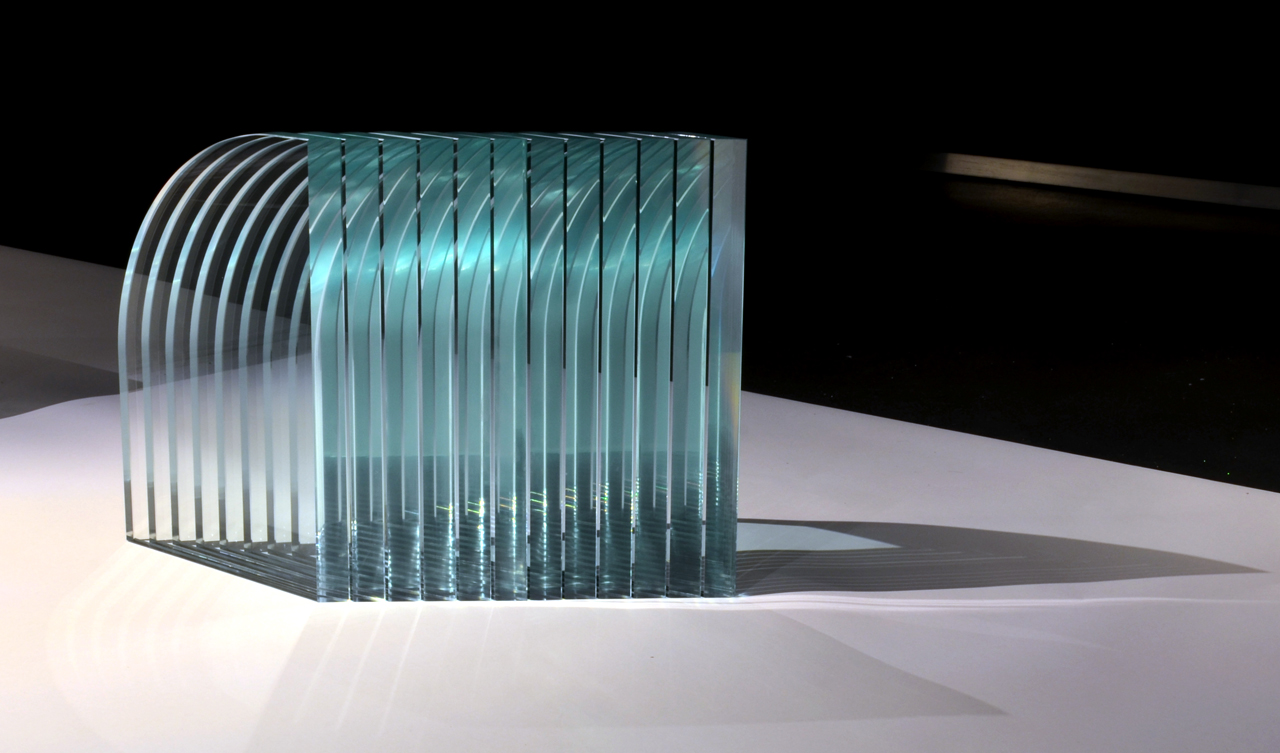
Vladimir Kopecký, Parabol, 2006

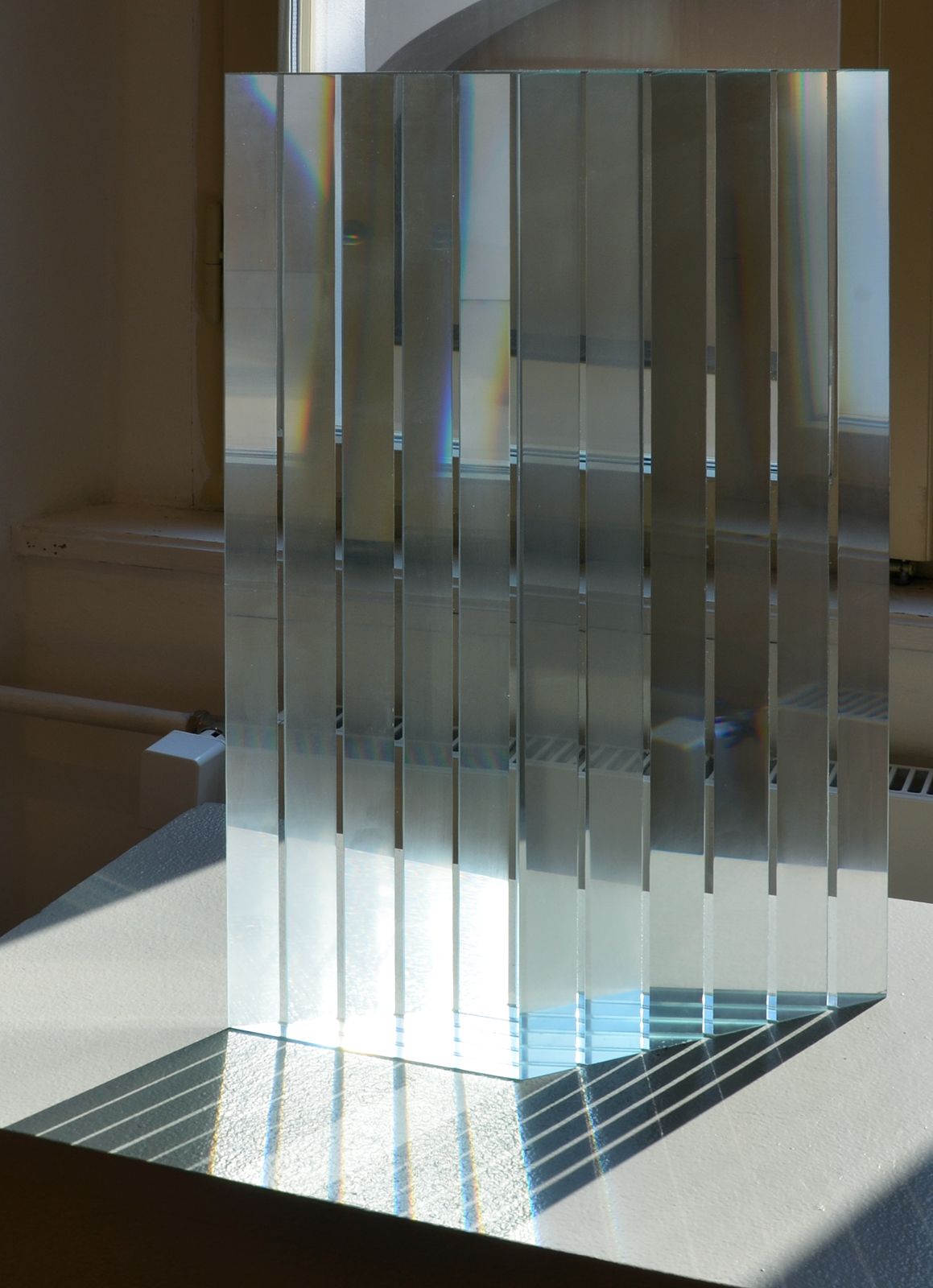
Vladimír Kopecký, Miracle II

Vladimír Kopecký is one of the most memorable personalities of modern Czech art. The success of his monumental composition at Expo 92 in Seville, in which he used tons of plate glass and literally hectolitres of colour in wild textures and eruptions, testifies to the fact that the fascination with the emotional experience of the unrestrained creation is a language that is completely understandable internationally. Since 1994, he has also presented his elemental and spontaneous artistic expression through performances, in which, accompanied by music (Ravel, Mussorgsky) uses hot cast glass and buckets of acrylic paints and becomes not only the creator but also the subject of the creative process.

=== Texts ===
Vladimír Kopecký has been writing poems since 2011 and texts commenting on and interpreting his works.

==== Quotes from the author ====
Since I was five years old, I wanted to be a painter. I like painting. I do it with a ravenous appetite, voraciously. I like absolute silence and the storm of the universe.

When I look at a picture painted by me and see something completely incomprehensible, which I not only do not understand, I cannot explain, I am startled by it and I even sense a kind of threat, only then does a powerful experience appear to me, not yet clouded by the mud of interpretation and conventionality. Then it only begins to be right.

For me, glass is not the subject of my expression, it is only a means to achieve unknown goals...I do not glorify glass. It is possible to treat it in various ways, even against the established notion of it, i.e. even in an ugly way - I myself coined the term "ugly glass" at the beginning of the 1960s. But I don't mean that glass always has to be like that. All I mean is that if I am after a distinctive idea, not an ornament, then I will ruthlessly strip the skin off the glass, for blood, if necessary.

My point is that the finished thing made of glass should give a deeper meaning to the observer and not merely speak by the properties of the material, which, though unique, are not enough for me to build on. In my work, which is both strictly geometric and spontaneously expressive, I try to express everything that fascinates me: the infinity of space, silence, anxiety and melancholy....

==== Poem ====
From the depths
to the heights
Below the width
I cut my misery
Into the flesh
Of decaying reality
And infuse it with
Thorough smoke

=== Realisations in architecture (selection) ===
- 1963 Havířov railway station
- 1966 Vítkovice railway station
- 1966 New Foundland Cultural Center, USA
- 1968/70 Olympik Hotel, Prague
- 1968/75 Glassworks Kavalier Sázava
- 1969 Electrotechnical Testing Institute Prague (mosaic)
- 1971 Water Treatment Plant, Želivka
- 1973, 1974 Mourning Hall Vsetín, Děčin
- 1974 Television transmitter Prague
- 1975 Balnea House, Prague, Lázeňský dům Hotel, Karlovy Vary
- 1978 Czech Television Studio, Prague
- 1979 ČKD Building, Prague
- 1981-1982 Bohemia Hotel, Ústí nad Labem
- 1984 Insurance company Zwolsche Algemeene, Niuewegein, Holland
- 1988 Slavie Hotel, Brno
- 1988/89 Konica Showroom, Tokyo
- 1989 Štefánik House, (now Legie Hotel), Sokolská 30, Prague 2
- 1992 Mayor's Hall, Toyama City Hall, Japan
- 1992 Leonard Dobbs House, Long Island, USA
- 1994 Technology Centre, Coburg
- 1996 Bank Gundezenhausen, Germany
- 1998 Česká spořitelna, Prague - Perštýn
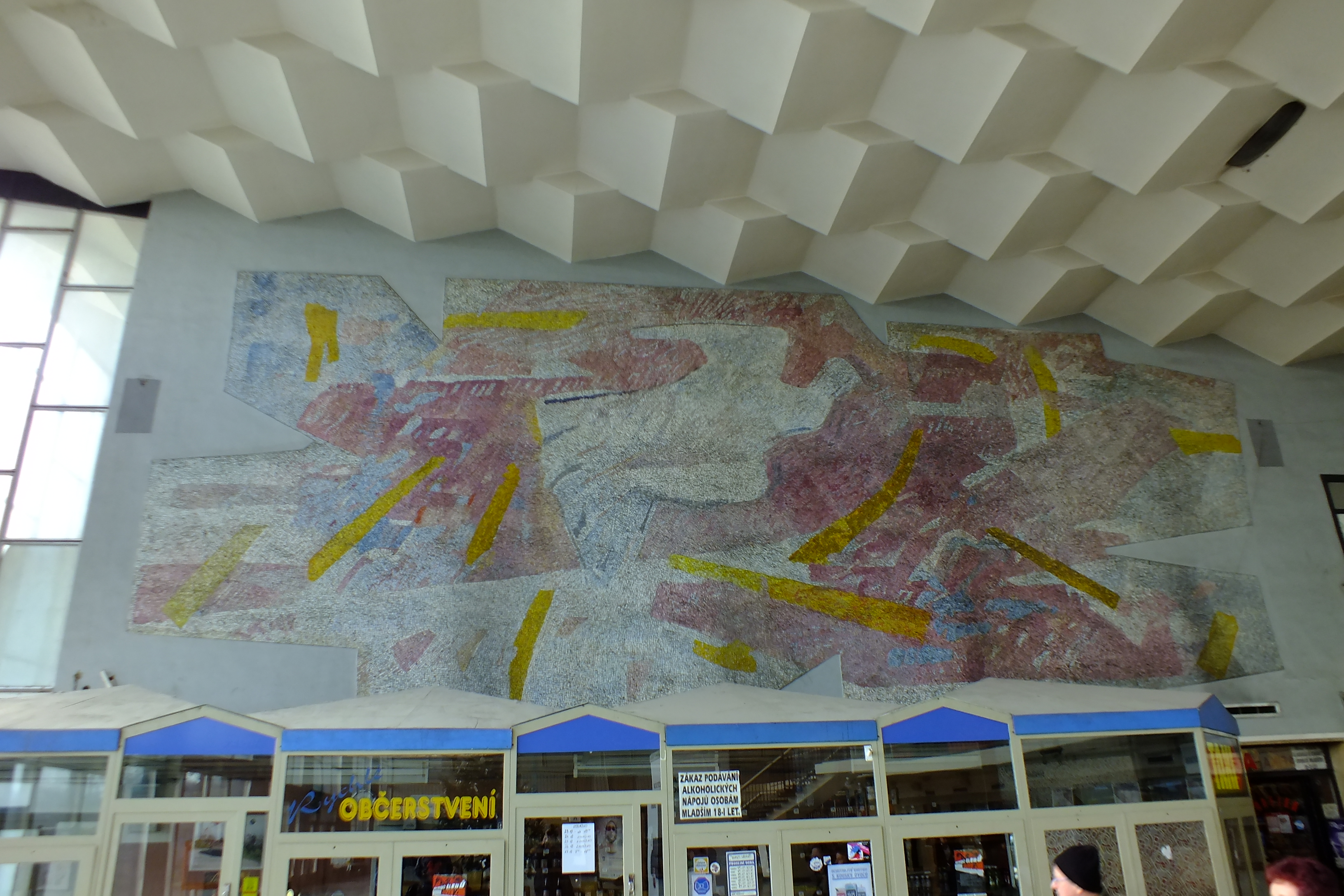
Vladimir Kopecký, glass mosaic, Havířov Railway Station

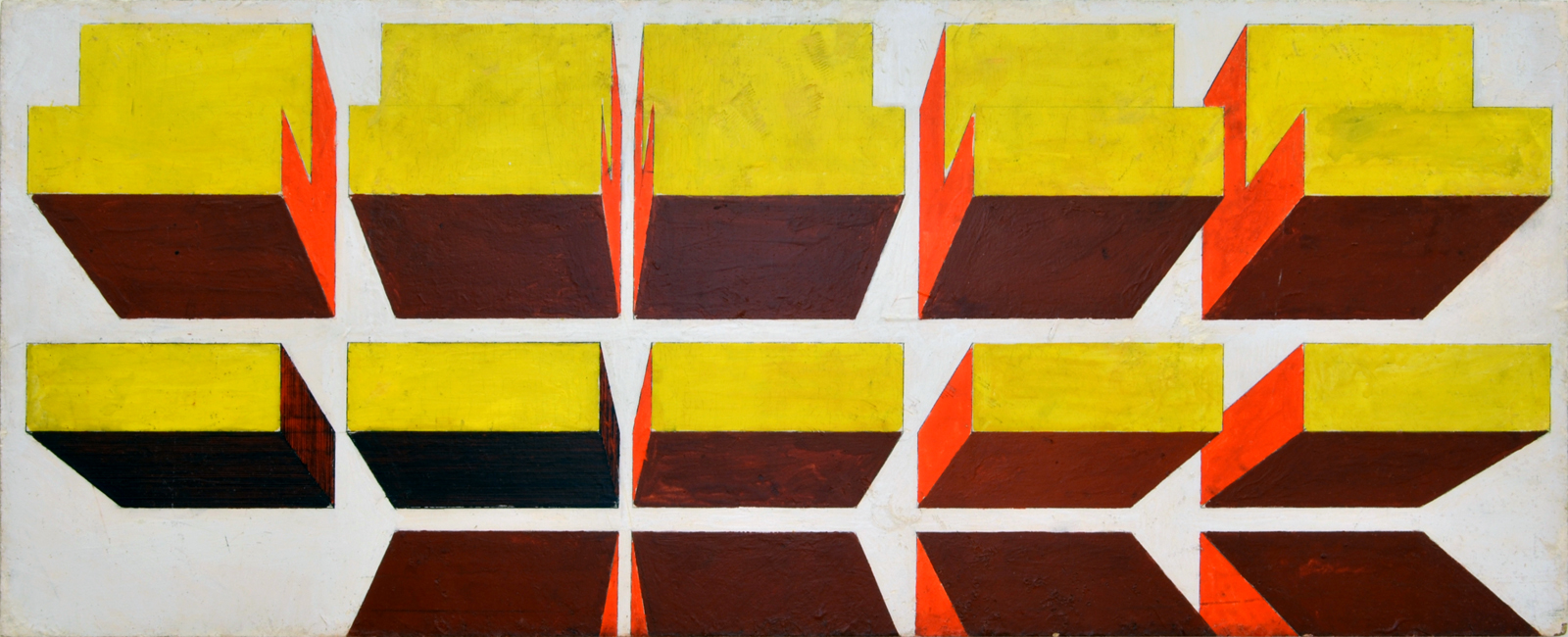
Vladimír Kopecký, Design for stucco lustro for Chemapol building, 1973

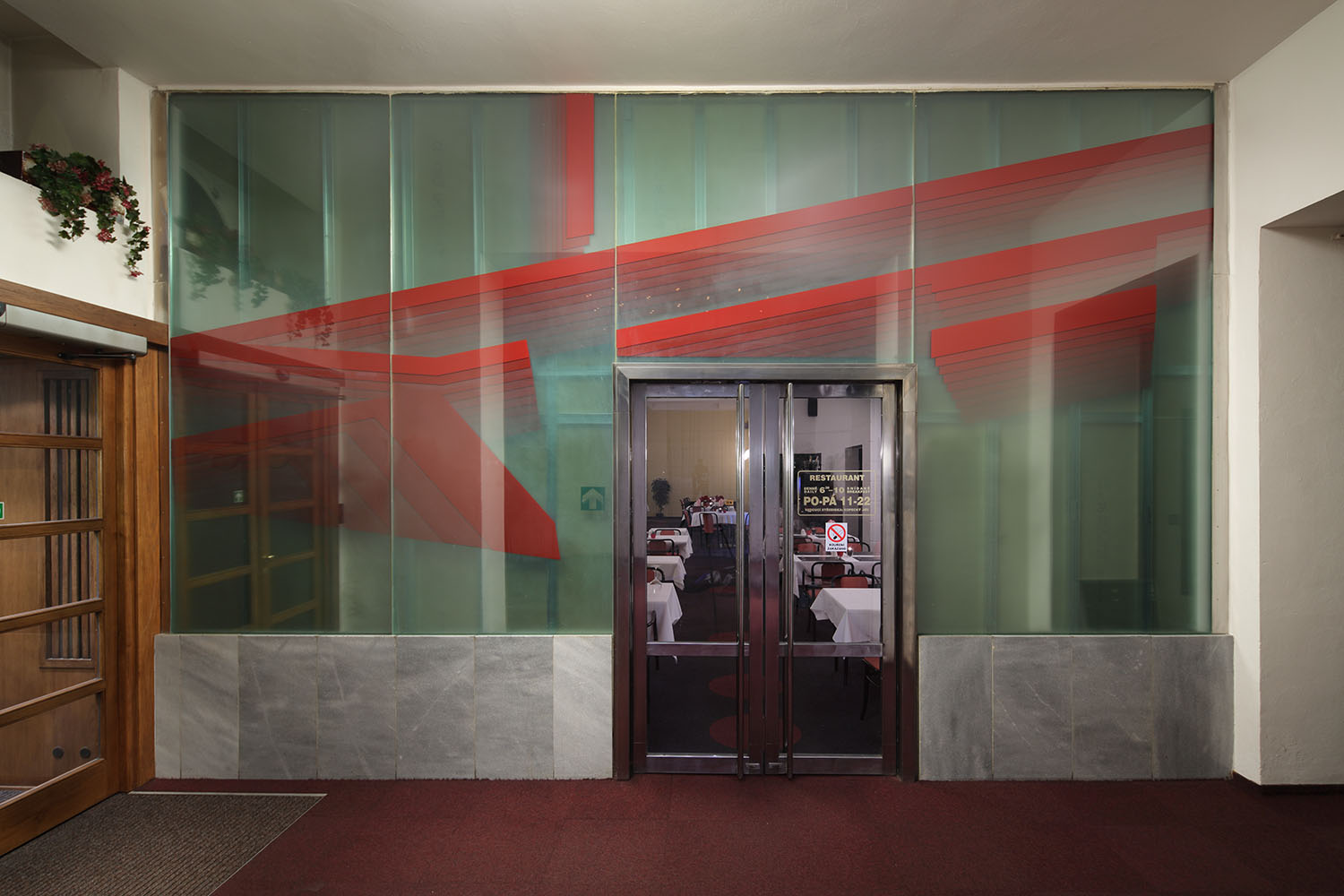
Vladimír Kopecký, Slavia hotel, plate glass composition, Brno, 1988

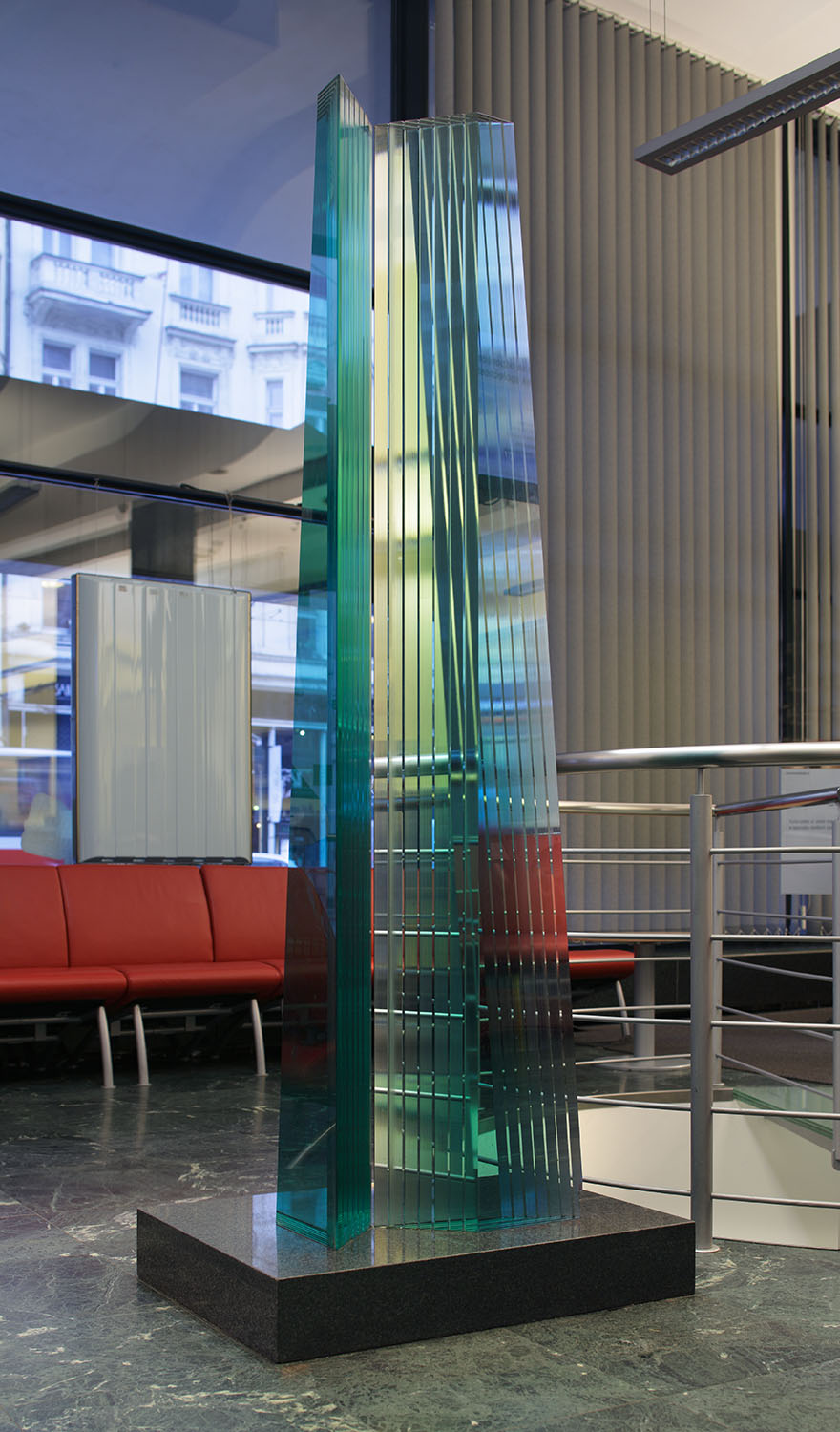
Vladimír Kopecký, Pillars, composed plate glass, 1998

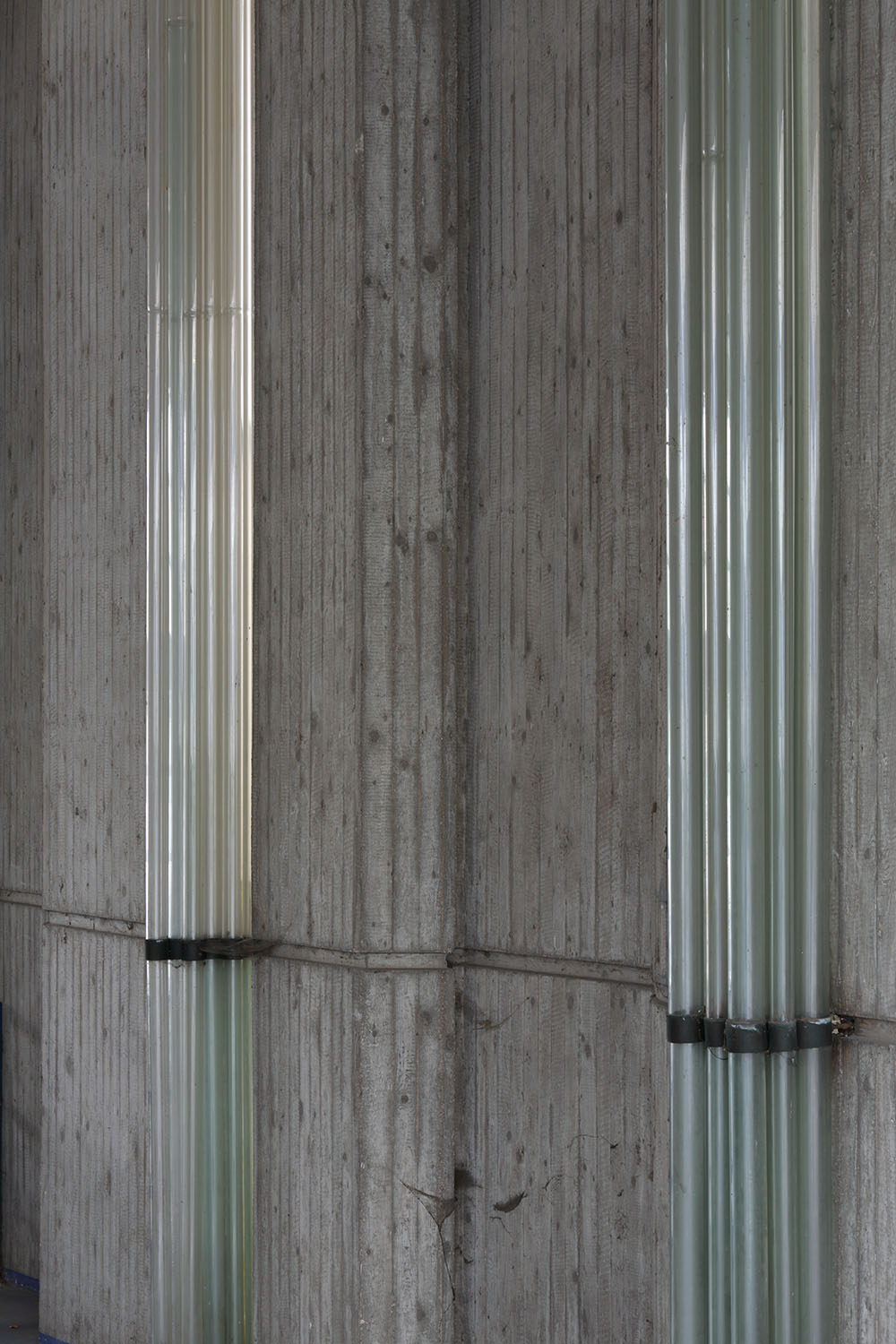
Vladimír Kopecký, Kavalier Glassworks Sázava, concrete, glass, 1968–1975

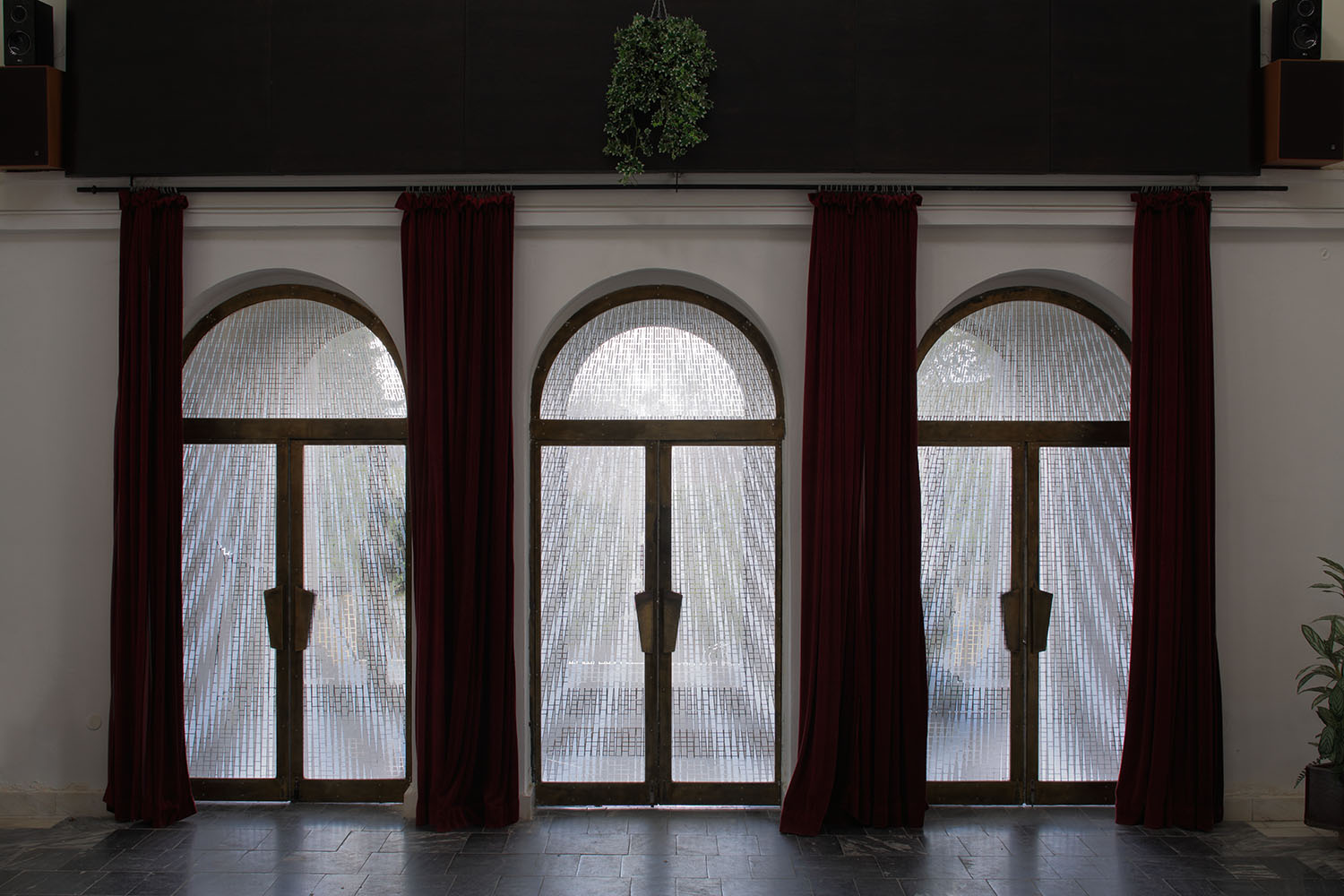
Vladimír Kopecký, Mourning Hall in Děčín, entrance, glass door, 1974

=== Representation in collections ===
- National Gallery Prague
- Museum of Decorative Arts in Prague
- Moravian Gallery in Brno
- Museum of Glass and Jewellery in Jablonec nad Nisou
- Gallery Klatovy - Klenová
- North Bohemian Museum in Liberec
- Benedikt Rejt Gallery, Louny
- Glass Museum Nový Bor
- Museum of Art Olomouc
- East Bohemian Gallery in Pardubice
- Pardubice (Chateau)|East Bohemian Museum in Pardubice
- Czech Museum of Fine Arts in Prague
- Prague City Gallery
- Museum Kampa
- Gallery of Modern Art in Roudnice nad Labem
- Collection from IGS Nový Bor, Lemberk Castle
- Kunstsammlungen der Veste, Coburg, DE
- Corning Museum of Glass, Corning, N.Y., USA
- Dudley Museum and Art Gallery, USA
- National Museum of Modern Art, Kyoto, Japan
- Musée des Arts Décoratifs de la Ville, Lausanne, CH
- Victoria and Albert Museum, London, UK
- The Lannan Foundation of Contemporary Art, Palm Beach, FL, USA
- Musée du verre de Sars-Poteries, F
- Yokohama Museum of Art, Japan
- Museum Angewandte Kunst, Frankfurt am Main
- Neue Pinakothek, Munich

=== Exhibitions ===
==== Participation in world exhibitions ====
- Expo 58, Brussels (with Adriena Šimotová, František Burant)
- Expo 67, Montreal
- Expo 1992, Seville

==== Solo ====
- 1970 Vladimír Kopecký: Paintings, Václav Špála Gallery, Prague
- 1981 Vladimír Kopecký: Paintings, glass objects, drawings, Sovinec
- 1988 Vladimír Kopecký: Paintings, Central Cultural House of Railway Workers, Prague
- 1989 Vladimír Kopecký: Paintings - Drawings, Josef Chloupek Studio, Brno
- 1989 Vladimír Kopecký, Essener Glasgalerie (Mareš I), Essen
- 1990 Vladimír Kopecký, The Azabu Museum of Arts and Crafts, Tokyo
- 1994 Vladimír Kopecký, Galerie Groeneveld, Almelo, Netherlands
- 1996 Vladimír Kopecký, Studio Glass Gallery, London
- 1997 Vladimír Kopecký: Paintings and Sculptures, Galerie na Jánském Vršku, Prague
- 1997 Vladimír Kopecký: Paintings, Emil Filla Exhibition Hall, Ústí nad Labem
- 1999 Vladimír Kopecký: Retrospective, City Gallery, Municipal Library, Prague
- 2000/01 Vladimír Kopecký: Collective Exhibition of Works from 1950 - 2000, House U Jonáše, East Bohemian Gallery Pardubice
- 2001 Vladimír Kopecký: Paintings, Objects, Exhibition Hall Sokolská 26, Ostrava
- 2001/02 Vladimír Kopecký: Intenzita prožitku / Intensity of Experience, Aspekt Gallery, Brno
- 2002 Vladimír Kopecký: Glass, Gallery of Fine Arts in Ostrava
- 2003 Vladimír Kopecký: Jaký byl a je, Gallery of the Academy of Arts and Crafts, Prague
- 2003/04 Vladimír Kopecký: To the Bitter End, Aspekt Gallery, Brno
- 2004 Vladimír Kopecký: Paintings and Objects, Veletržní palác, National Gallery Prague
- 2004/05 Vladimír Kopecký: Paintings, Gallery of Modern Art in Roudnice nad Labem
- 2005 Vladimír Kopecký, Navrátil Gallery, Prague
- 2007 Vladimír Kopecký, Aspekt Gallery, Brno
- 2011 Vladimír Kopecký, Havelka Gallery, Prague, Galerie Aspekt, Brno
- 2011 Vladimír Kopecký: graphic art, Chateau Valašské Meziříčí, Museum of Art Olomouc
- 2014 Vladimír Kopecký: Storm and Calm, Museum Kampa, Prague
- 2014 Vladimír Kopecký: Summa Summarum, Dorka Gallery, Domažlice
- 2016 Vladimír Kopecký: Dálky a póly / Distances and Poles, Špilberk Castle, Brno
- 2017 Vladimír Kopecký: Something Third Between Chaos and Order, North Bohemian Gallery of Fine Arts in Litoměřice
- 2017 Vladimír Kopecký: Nekonečný třesk / Eternal Struggle, Moravský Krumlov Castle
- 2017 Vladimír Kopecký: Geometry, Kuzebauch Gallery, Prague
- 2018 Vladimír Kopecký: Na EX!, Havelka Gallery, Prague
- 2018 Vladimír Kopecký: Energie, Museum Kampa - Jan and Meda Mládek Foundation, Prague
- 2019 Vladimír Kopecký: I devour colour, Topičův salon, Prague
- 2021/2022 Vladimír Kopecký: Gloria, Museum Kampa - Jan and Meda Mládkov Foundation, Prague

==== Collective ====
See abART Information System:Kopecký Vladimír - exhibitions

== Sources ==
=== Monographs ===
- Vladimír Kopecký, 184 p., Prague City Gallery, Moraviapress Břeclav 1999, ISBN 80-86181-19-7; ISBN 80-7010-069-9
- Vladimír Kopecký: Storm and Calm, Martin Dostál (ed.), 270 s., Retro Gallery, Prague 2014, ISBN 978-80-260-6037-6

=== Catalogues ===
- Vladimír Kopecký, text by Jindřich Chalupecký, cat. 12 p., Union of Czech Artists, Prague 1970
- Vladimír Kopecký, text by Stanislav Libenský, Masae Nakama, GLASSWORK Kyoto, Japan 1990
- Vladimír Kopecký: Paintings, text by Ivo Janoušek, cat. 24 p., ÚKDŽ, Prague 1988
- Vladimír Kopecký: Intensity of Experience, Aspekt Gallery, Brno 2001
- Vladimír Kopecký, text by Kopecký V, cat. 2 p., Exhibition Hall Sokolská 26, Ostrava 2001
- Vladimír Kopecký: Paintings, text by Miroslava Hlaváčková, cat. 28 p., Gallery of Modern Art in Roudnice nad Labem 2004, ISBN 80-85053-49-7
- Vladimír Kopecký, Oldřich Palata (ed.), Aspekt Gallery, Brno 2007, ISBN 80-238-7954-5
- Vladimír Kopecký, text by Petr Vaňous, Havelka Gallery, Prague 2011
- Vladimír Kopecký: Distances and Poles, text by Ján Gajdůšek, Brno 2016
- Vladimír Kopecký (poems and paintings), photo by Gabriel Urbánek, 200 copies privately published by the author, Prague 2017, ISBN 978-80-270-1215-2
- Vladimír Kopecký: Na EX!!, text by Radek Wohlmuth, Galerie Havelka, Prague 2018
- Vladimír Kopecký: Prostoupení, text by Adriana Primusová, 300 copies privately published by the author, Prague 2019, ISBN 978-80-270-5507-4
- Vladimír Kopecký: Šeptám / I Whisper, text by Helena Musilová, privately published by the author, Prague 2021, ISBN 978-80-270-9840-8

=== Encyclopedias and general sources ===
- Josef Raban, Modern Bohemian Glass, Artia, Prague 1963
- Dušan Šindelář, Contemporary Art Glass in Czechoslovakia, Obelisk, Prague 1970
- Pavla Dvorská, Contemporary Monumental Art, Odeon, Prague 1978
- Alena Adlerová Kudělková Königová, Contemporary Glass, Odeon, Prague 1979
- Bénamou Geneviève, L´art aujourd'hui en Tchecoslovaquie, Paris 1979
- Jiří Karbaš, Czech Fine Art in Architecture 1945 - 1985, Odeon, Prague 1985
- Pavla Pečinková, Contemporary Czech Painting, G+B Arts International Limited, East Roseville, 1993, ISBN 978-976-8097-25-5
- Jindřich Chalupecký, New Art in Bohemia, H&H Publishing House, Jinočany 1994, ISBN 80-85787-81-4
- Sylva Petrová, České sklo / Czech Glass, Gallery, Prague 2001 ISBN 80-86010-44-9
- Helmut Ricke (ed.), Czech Glass 1945–1980. Design in an Age of Adversity, Arnoldsche 2005
- Petr Pivoda, Milan Hlaveš, Glass - Vladimír Kopecký & from his school, MA'MA Club Gallery, Ostrava 2015
- Jana Kunešová, Milan Hlaveš, The Story of Bohemian Glass, Museum of Decorative Arts, National Museum of Korea 2015, ISBN 978-80-7101-147-7
- Milan Hlaveš et al. (ed.), 7 + 1, Masters of Czech Glass, Museum Kampa - Jan and Meda Mládek Foundation, Prague 2016, ISBN 978-80-87344-32-3
- Sylva Petrová, Czech Glass, 428 p., Academy of Arts and Crafts in Prague, Prague 2018, ISBN 978-80-87989-50-0
- Caterina Tognon, Sylva Petrová (eds.), Vetro boemo: i grandi maestri / Bohemian Glass: The Great Masters (Václav Cigler, Vladimír Kopecký, Stanislav Libenský, Jaroslava Brychtová, René Roubíček, Miluše Roubíčková, con / with Josef Sudek), Skira editore, Milano 2023, ISBN 978-88-572-4985-8 on-line

=== Other ===
- České ateliéry / Czech studios (71 contemporary artists ), 2005, Art CZ, Prague, ISBN 80-239-5528-4
- Hynek Glos, Petr Vizina, Stará garda / Old Guard, Argo, Prague 2016, pp. 108–115, ISBN 978-80-257-1881-0
