= Alena Kučerová =

Czech printmaker (1935–2026)

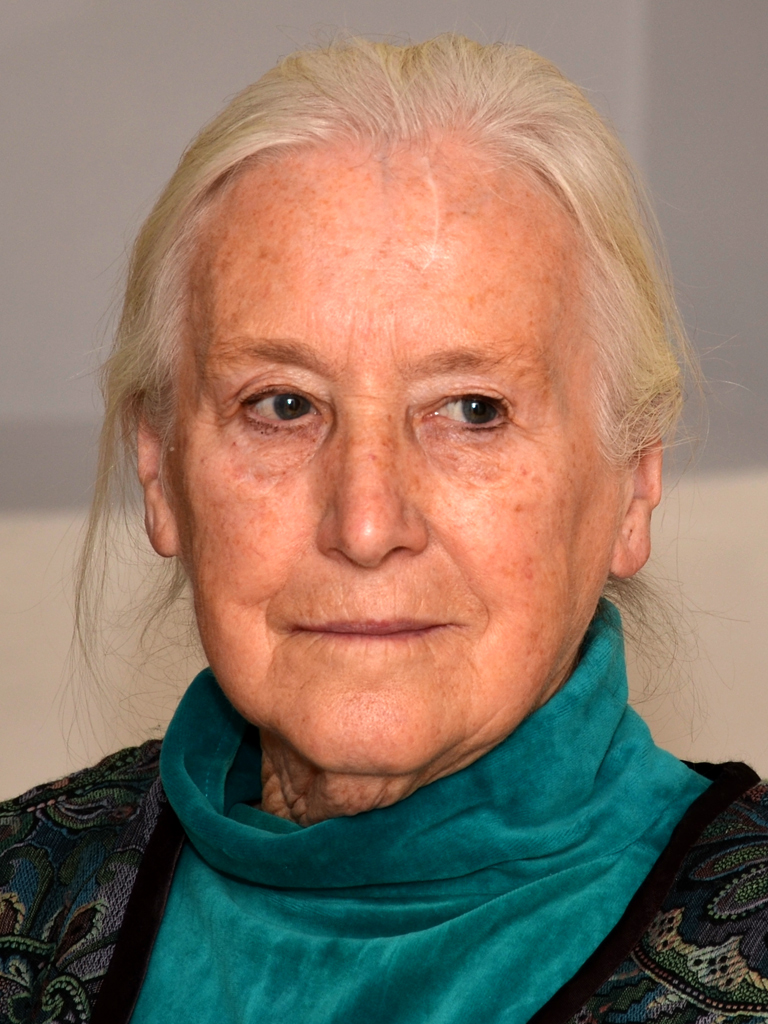
- Portrait of Alena Kučerová
- Born: 28 April 1935; Prague, Czechoslovakia
- Died: 23 January 2026 (aged 90); Czech Republic
- Education: UMPRUM
- Occupation: Printmaker

Alena Kučerová (28 April 1935 – 23 January 2026) was a Czech printmaker.

== Background ==
A native of Prague, Kučerová studied at that city's Advanced School of Graphic Art from 1950 until 1954. From 1955 until 1959 she attended the Prague Academy of Applied Arts.

Kučerová died on 23 January 2026, at the age of 90.

== Work ==
In the 1960s Kučerová began using the traditional medium of printmaking in an experimental manner. She is especially noted for her technique of building the image using dots before incorporating other forms. Around 1965 she began perforating metal with a shoemaker's awl, printing the motifs created and also exhibiting the perforated tin matrixes as art in their own right. Many of the perforated tins exhibit figurative references. Further experimentation with materials and strong color led her to embrace the aesthetics of Pop Art.

Five works by Kučerová are in the collection of the National Gallery of Art. Two are owned by the Museum of Modern Art, and one is held by the Art Institute of Chicago.

== Awards and distinctions ==
- Biennale des Jeunes, Paris, mention d'honneur (1965)
- Premio internazionale Biella per l'incisione, Italy (1967)
- Award of the Czech Writers' Association (1967)
- Cena Vladimíra Boundníka, Foundation Inter-Kontakt-Grafik, Czech Republic (1997)
