= Michal Trpák =

Czech sculptor (born 1982)

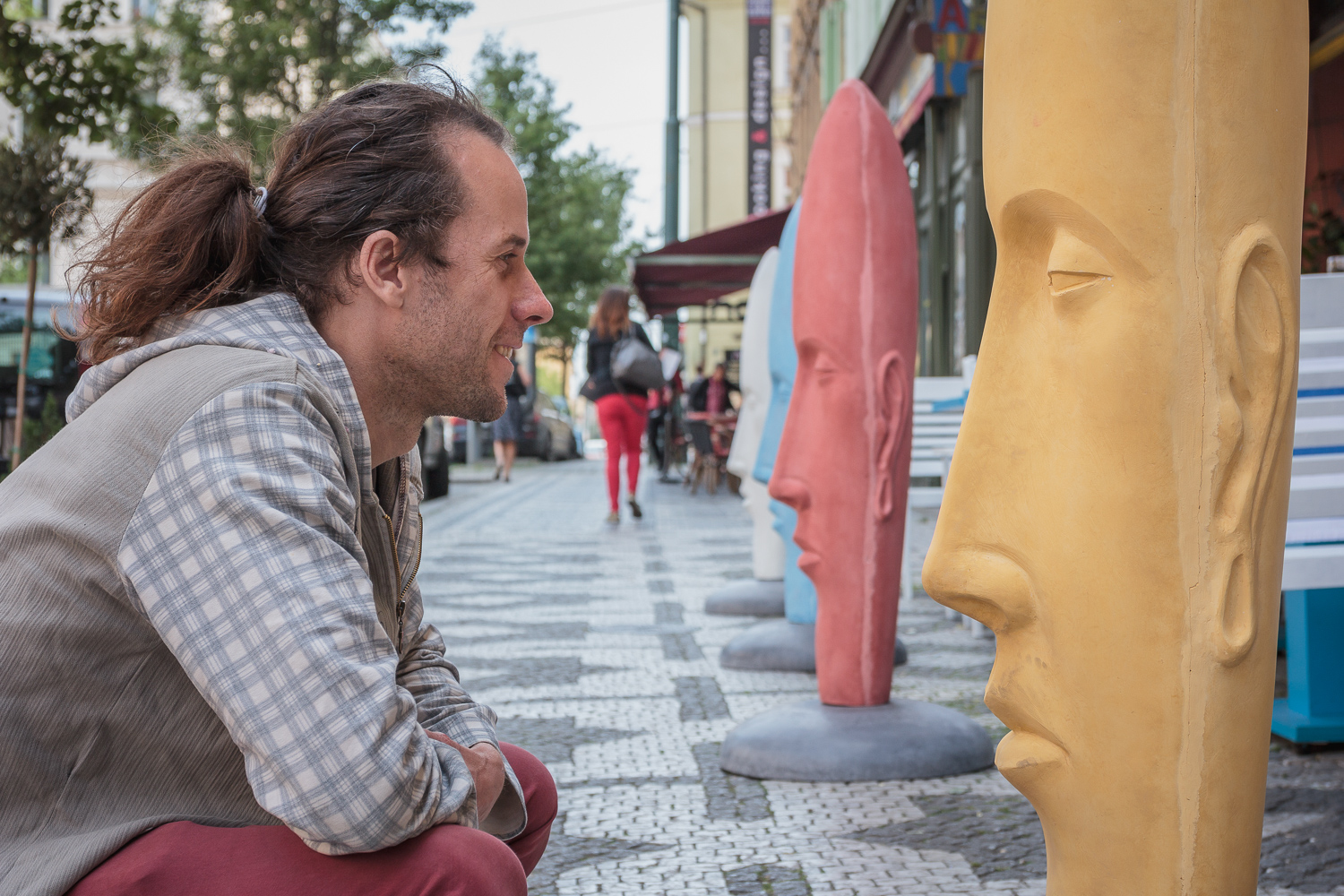
Michal Trpák and Shoshones: sculptures on exhibition on public thoroughfare

Michal Trpák (born 1982) is a Czech sculptor.

== Biography ==
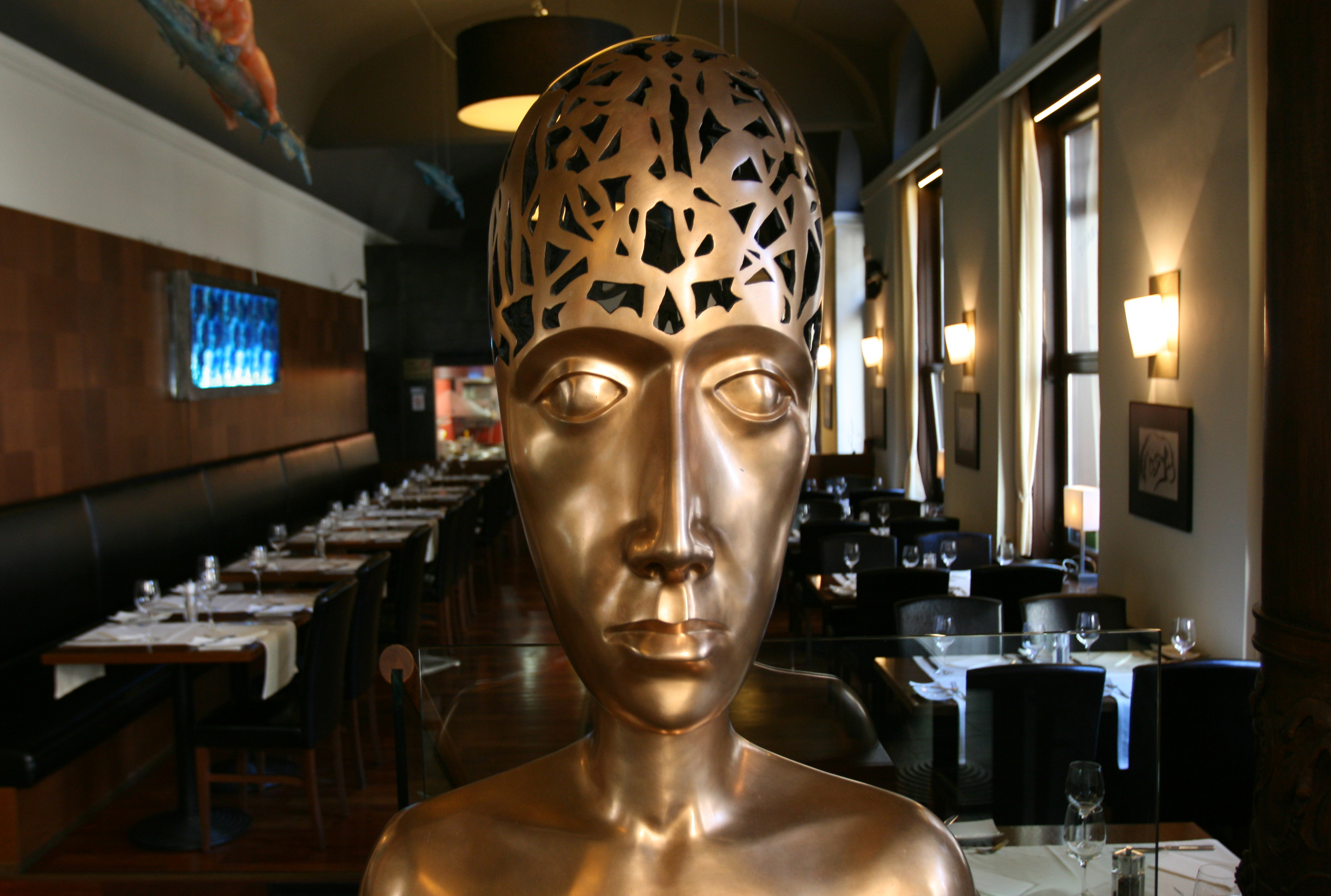
One of Trpák's sculptures on exhibit in a restaurant

Trpák was born in 1982 in České Budějovice. His art studies started at the Secondary School of Arts in Český Krumlov. He then proceeded to study at Academy of Arts, Architecture and Design in Prague where he earned his master's degree. During this study he went on a one-year exchange stay to Lahti in Finland and later a one-year exchange in Vancouver, Canada. After graduating from Prague in 2007 he started to work as an artist. Soon thereafter he earned his PhD at the Academy of Arts in Banská Bystrica, Slovakia.

Since 2007 Michal Trpák is organizing a sculpture exhibition in the public space of České Budějovice called ART where sculptors exhibit their works during the summer. Starting in 2015 he curates the sculpture exhibition Sculpture Line in Prague. The sculptures and paintings created by Michal Trpák are on display in a variety of public spaces or held in private collections in the Czech Republic, Germany, Britain, Russia, France and Canada. Besides studying and creating artistic projects Michal travels to various countries, visits remote areas of world such as Alaska, Kamchatka and the Himalayas or he dives and sails the seas to obtain inspiration and to be closer to nature, which is the best sculptor.
