= Adriena Šimotová =

Czech artist (1926–2014)

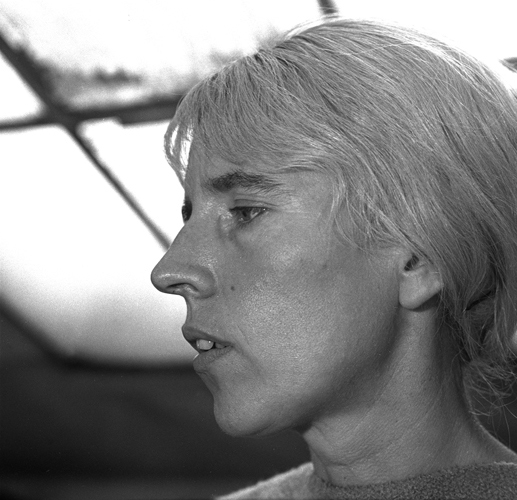
- Šimotová in 1960s
- Born: 6 August 1928; Prague
- Died: 19 May 2014 (aged 85); Prague
- Occupation: Artist
- Known for: Paintings

Adriena Šimotová (1926–2014) was a prominent Czech artist. Known for her work with paper and fabric, she held numerous exhibitions in the Czech Republic and abroad during her lifetime including a retrospective organized by the National Gallery in Prague in 2001.

== Biography ==
Šimotová graduated from the Academy of Arts, Architecture and Design in Prague. Her early work of the 1960s was exhibited at venues including the Václav Špála Gallery and the Sao Paulo biennial. She was a founding member of the Czech art group UB 12, along with Václav Boštík, Stanislav Kolíbal, and others. After her husband's death in 1972, she shifted her artistic focus away from painting and began to use fabrics and sculptural installations. Due to the Czech Republic's political circumstances in the 1970s and 1980s, much of Šimotová's work at the time was shown on an unofficial basis or subject to censorship.

Šimotová received the French honor the Ordre des Arts et des Lettres in 1991 and the Czech Medal of Merit in 1997. In 2000, she received the Herder Prize. Today, several of her works are held in the permanent collection of the Centre Georges Pompidou. She received an honorary doctorate from the Academy of Arts, Architecture and Design in Prague in 2007.

Šimotová died in 2014 at the age of 87.

== Collections ==
- National Gallery in Prague
- Galerie Rudolfinum
- Museum Kampa
- Centre Georges Pompidou
