= Academy of Arts, Architecture and Design in Prague =

Public university in Czechia

- Vysoká škola uměleckoprůmyslová v Praze
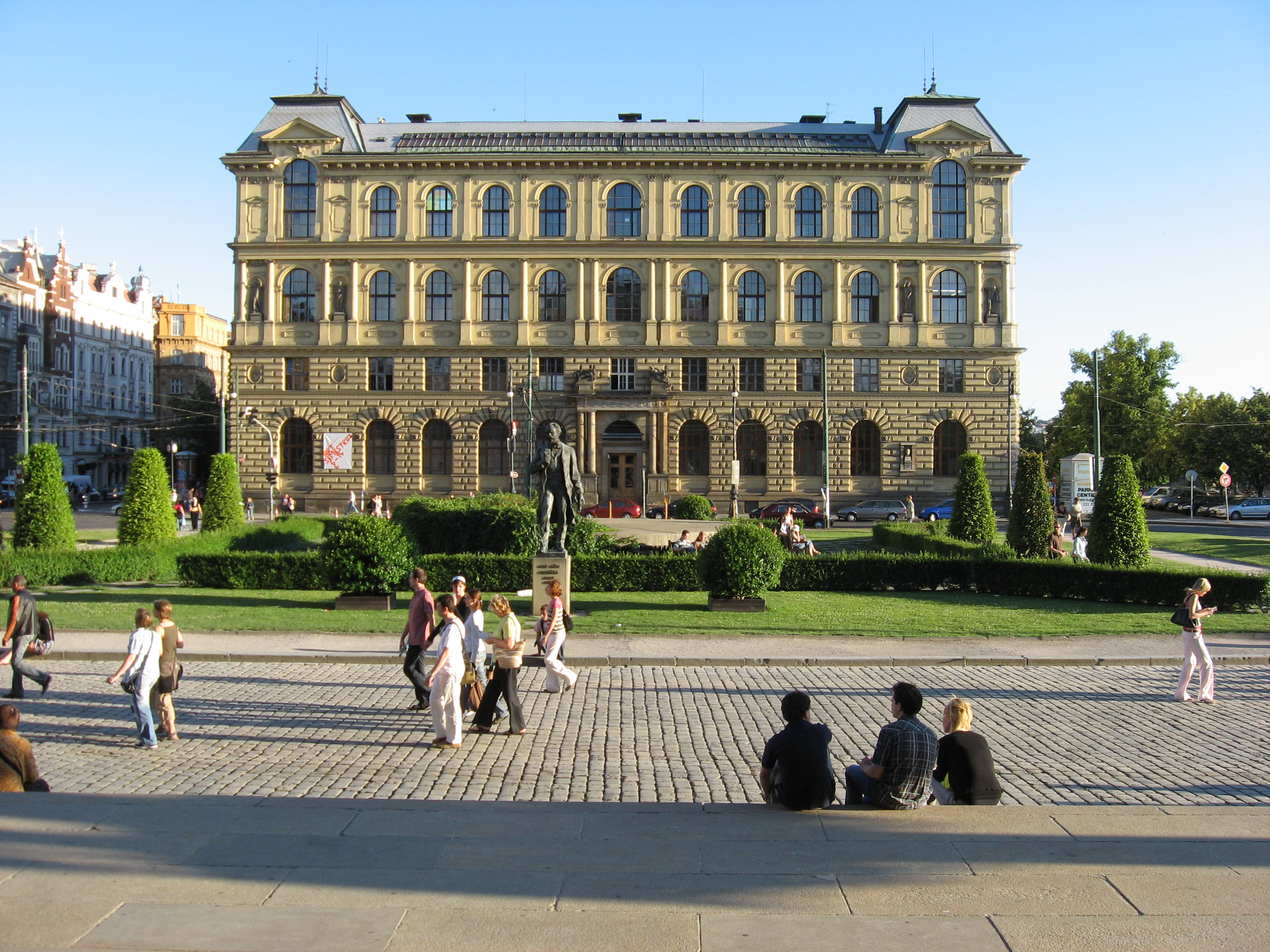
- Other name: VŠUP
- Type: Public
- Established: 1885
- Rector: Jindřich Smetana
- Location: Prague, Czech Republic; 50°5′19.3″N 14°24′53.4″E
- Campus: Urban
- Website: www.umprum.cz

The Academy of Arts, Architecture and Design in Prague (AAAD, Czech: Vysoká škola uměleckoprůmyslová v Praze, abbreviated VŠUP, also known as UMPRUM) is a public university located in Prague, Czech Republic. The university offers the study disciplines of painting, illustration and graphics, fashion design, product design, graphic design, ceramics and porcelain, photography and architecture. Along with other buildings, the academy is part of the city's unique glass art cluster.

== Establishment ==
The Academy was founded in 1885 as the School of Applied Arts in Prague (UPŠ). At the time of its establishment it was the first and only state art school in Bohemia. Its mission, according to the founding charter, was "to nurture manpower skillful in the arts for the artistic industry and to train educational staff for applied arts teaching and for teaching drawing at secondary schools." It was divided into a three-year general education school and follow-up three- to five-year vocational and special schools with the disciplines of architecture, sculpture, drawing, painting, film & TV graphics, metal working, wood carving, floral painting and textiles.

The faculty staff was chosen from among the leading personalities of Czech culture. The first director of the school was the architect František Schmoranz Jr. and the teaching staff included František Ženíšek (1885–1896), Josef Václav Myslbek (1885–1896), Jakub Schikaneder (1885–1923), Celda Klouček (1887–1917), Felix Jenewein (1890–1902), Otakar Hostinsky (1847–1910), and Friedrich Ohmann (1888–1898).

Among the first graduates were Jan Preisler, Stanislav Sucharda, Josef Mařatka, Vojtěch Preissig, František Kobliha, Bohumil Kafka, Miloš Slovák and Julius Mařák.

In 1896, the position of the Academy of Fine Arts (AVU) was reinforced by its nationalization. Some of the teaching staff left UPŠ and the school focused primarily on applied arts. The architect Jiří Stibral (1886–1920) became the new director. The faculty staff comprised Stanislav Sucharda, Jan Preisler, Karel Vítězslav Mašek, Alois Dryák, Ladislav Šaloun and Jan Kotěra. They were later joined by Karel Boromejský Mádl, who worked as art professor and library administrator. Kotěra advocated "unity of visual culture and the creation of a modern style."

== Art Nouveau period ==
At the turn of the century, UPŠ became one of the centres of the Art Nouveau movement, inspired by its achievements in the late 19th century. And so the school represented Czech art at the World Exhibition in Paris in 1900, where it won the prestigious Grand Prix. The new generation of students in the early 20th century included future representatives of Czech Cubism and the interwar avant-garde - Josef Čapek, Václav Beneš, Josef Gočár, František Kysela, Bohumil Kubišta, Otakar Novotný, Linka Procházková, Jan Zrzavý, Václav Špála, Josef Šíma, Emilie Paličková, Jaroslav Rössler and Pravoslav Kotík.

== Czechoslovak Republic ==
In 1918, after the creation of Czechoslovakia, UPŠ failed to obtain the “High School of Decorative Arts” status it was aiming for, but nevertheless it strengthened its autonomy. From 1920 it was led by an elected rector and new artistic personalities joined the faculty staff - Pavel Janák, František Kysela, Jaroslav Horejc, Vratislav Hugo Brunner and Helena Johnová and the art historians Antonín Matějček, Václav Vilém Štech and Jaromír Pečírka. In its early years of independent status, the school sought to create a “new national style”, though one still based on ornament in the tradition of Art Deco (the successor of Art Nouveau with theoretical manifestos from the beginning of the century). In 1925, the school represented Czechoslovakia at the International Exhibition of Decorative Arts in Paris, where it received both official recognition and criticism from the perspective of the European avant-garde. Under the growing international influence in the late 1920s, the school began to focus on Constructivism and Functionalism. The architect Otakar Novotný was strongly influenced by the German Bauhaus. Among the graduates of the interwar period were Jan Bauch, Cyril Bouda, Karel Černý, Toyen, František Foltýn, Ľudovít Fulla, Mikuláš Galanda, František Gross, František Hudeček, Josef Kaplický, Antonín Kybal, Zdeněk Sklenář, Karel Souček, Ladislav Sutnar, Karel Svolinský, Jiří Trnka and Ladislav Zívr.

== Occupation and the postwar period ==
Following the closure of the universities in 1939, the school replaced AVU until the end of WWII. It thus strengthened its position and by a 1946 Act acquired a new status and the name Vysoká škola uměleckoprůmyslová (The Academy of Applied Arts). A year later, in 1947, study was extended to five years, with studios across the departments of applied architecture, applied painting, applied graphic arts, textiles and clothing, applied sculpture, glassmaking, pottery and ceramics.

== After February 1948 ==
After the communist putsch in February 1948, the school was also subjected to the influence of ideological and political dogmatism. The new teachers were subordinated to socialist realism. Nevertheless, the handicraft disciplines – textiles, glass, metal and ceramics – maintained their quality, and in the fifties celebrated figures joined the faculty – such as Adolf Hoffmeister, Arsén Pohribný and Josef Wagner. The graduates of the period included Vladimír Janoušek, Věra Janoušková, Hermína Melicharová, Čestmír Kafka, Milan Grygar, Stanislav Kolíbal, Stanislav Libenský, Zdeněk Palcr, Adriena Šimotová, Jiří John, Eva Kmentová, Květa Pacovská, Olbram Zoubek, Jan Hladík, Jenny Hladíková, Vladimír Kopecký, Jiří Balcar and René Roubíček. One of the school's successes was the awarding of the Czech pavilion at Expo 58 in Brussels. In the 1960s, the study period was extended to six years and intensive development took place especially in the art and craft disciplines. The Department of Industrial Design was also established at the former Zlín School of Art, which was merged with the Academy in 1959.

== After 1968 ==
The so-called "consolidation" influenced by the political "normalization" in the early 1970s also affected the school. A number of the personalities who had maintained its quality were obliged to leave. They included František Muzika, Adolf Hoffmeister, Antonín Kybal, Karel Svolinský and Jiří Trnka. The school was led by conformist Communist Party officials under the Rector Jan Simota (1973-1985) and his successor Jan Mikula.

== Today ==
The school was reorganized after the Velvet Revolution of November 1989. At present (2014) it comprises five practical departments: architecture, design, fine arts, applied arts and graphics and a sixth, theoretical department teaching art history and aesthetics. In total there are 23 studios at the academy.

Contemporary alumni and tutors include the architects Eva Jiřičná, Jan Kaplický and Tomáš Pilař, the designers Bořek Šípek and Dominika Nell Applová, the fine artists Adriena Šimotová, Jan Kubíček, David Černý, Kurt Gebauer, Jiří Černický, Martin Mainer, Karel Gott, Václav Cigler and Jaroslav Róna, the graphic designers Zdeněk Ziegler and Klára Kvízová, the sculptors Karen LaMonte, Michal Trpák and Zuzana Čížková, the typographer František Štorm, the film animators Jiří Barta, Pavel Koutský and Michaela Pavlátová and the theorists Josef Hlaváček and Jan Tomeš.

== The school building ==
=== Elevation of the school from 1882 ===
The school building was erected in 1882-1885 according to plans by František Schmoranz Jr. and Jan Machytka inspired directly by the art academies in Paris and Vienna. Originally, the school occupied only the wing on the Alšově nábřeží embankment, while the wing facing Jan Palach Square (Czech: Náměstí Jana Palacha) housed the Academy of Painting.

=== Name ===
The Academy of Arts, Architecture and Design is called Vysoká škola uměleckoprůmyslová (VŠUP) in Czech (literally the “College of Industrial Arts”), popularly abbreviated to “UMPRUM”, though the same abbreviation is also commonly used for the Museum of Decorative Arts (Uměleckoprůmyslové muzeum - UPM). In neither case, however, is the abbreviation official, nor has it ever been.
