= Alena Bílková =

Czech printmaker and glass artist

Alena Bílková (born 13 September 1946) is a Czech printmaker and glass artist.

Bílková was born in Ústí nad Labem and initially studied at the Secondary School of Applied Arts for Glassmaking in Železný Brod. During her career she has exhibited extensively across the Czech Republic. At the Academy of Arts, Architecture and Design in Prague she undertook further studies with Stanislav Libenský. Long married to artist and restorer Michael Bílek, she often exhibited jointly with him. During her career she has been active mostly as a printmaker.

A 1990 mixed-media work by Bílková, Z Cyklu voda "svetla"/From the Cycle Water "Light", is owned by the National Gallery of Art.
