= Siege of Dunkirk (1944–1945) =

1944–1945 battle in France during World War II

Siege of Dunkirk (1944-1945)
- Part of the Allied advance from Paris to the Rhine in the Second World War
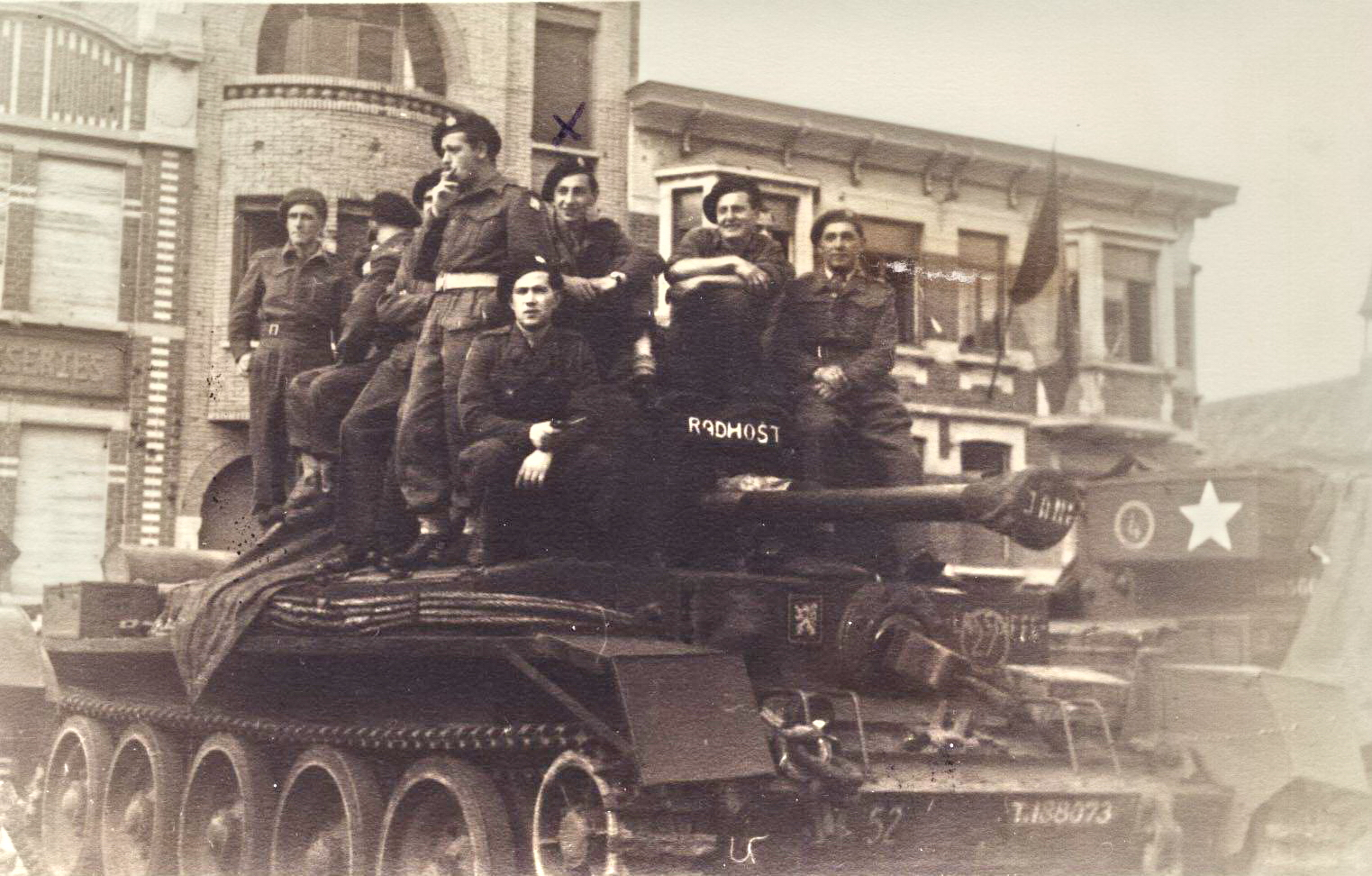
- Czechoslovak soldiers on a Cromwell tank near Dunkirk, shortly after the German capitulation.
Date	15 September 1944 – 9 May 1945; (7 months, 25 days)
Location	Dunkirk, France 51°02′18″N 2°22′39″E
Result	See § End of war

Belligerents
Canada; United Kingdom; Czechoslovakia; France	Germany

Commanders and leaders
(United Kingdom) Bernard Montgomery; (Canada) Harry Crerar; (Czechoslovak government-in-exile) Alois Liška; (France) Yves Raoul Jean Levavre	(Nazi Germany) Wolfgang von Kluge (surrendered); (Nazi Germany) Friedrich Frisius (surrendered)

Strength
14,000+	14,000

Casualties and losses
Czechoslovak; 167 killed; 461 wounded; 40 missing	14,000 (most POW)

The siege of Dunkirk in the Second World War (also known as the Second Battle of Dunkirk) began in September 1944, when the Second Canadian Division surrounded the fortified city and port of Dunkirk. The siege lasted until after the end of the European war in Europe. German units within the fortress withstood probing attacks and as the opening of the port of Antwerp was more important, the 21st Army Group commander, Field Marshal Bernard Montgomery, decided to contain but not capture Dunkirk with the 1st Czechoslovak Armoured Brigade. The fortress, commanded by Admiral Friedrich Frisius, eventually surrendered unconditionally to Brigadier General Alois Liška, the commander of the Czechoslovak brigade group, on 9 May 1945, a day after the surrender of Nazi Germany took effect.

== Background ==
The First Canadian Army operated on the left flank of the 21st Army Group line of advance and Montgomery had directed them to clear the Channel ports before continuing into the Netherlands. Most of the ports had been fortified and despite the generally poor quality of the garrisons, it was necessary to capture them with set-piece attacks.

The ports were needed to supply the Allied armies and the lack of such facilities had halted or slowed much offensive activity. Montgomery had estimated that the Channel ports would be sufficient for his needs and this view persisted until mid-September. Under orders from Dwight Eisenhower, the Allied Supreme Commander, Montgomery modified his instructions to the Canadian commander, Henry Crerar, on 13 to 14 September, "Early use of Antwerp so urgent that I am prepared to give up operations against Calais and Dunkirk" and "Dunkirk will be left to be dealt with later; for the present it will be merely masked" (the garrison prevented from mounting sorties). Action against Calais continued in Operation Undergo, at least partly due to the need to silence the heavy artillery nearby. The forces that might have been used to capture Dunkirk were released for the Battle of the Scheldt to open the route to the largely undamaged port of Antwerp. Instead, smaller Allied forces held a perimeter around the port.

== Prelude ==
In the first weeks of the siege, while Allied forces were being deployed on the Scheldt, several formations took short turns at containing Dunkirk. The 5th Canadian Infantry Brigade, part of the 2nd Canadian Division, was relieved by the 4th Special Service Brigade (4th SSB, a Royal Marines Commando formation), which was in turn relieved by the 154th Infantry Brigade of the 51st (Highland) Division. The bulk of the siege was performed by the 1st Czechoslovak Armoured Brigade from early October until the final surrender. The German garrison consisted of a motley, including Kriegsmarine and Luftwaffe personnel, as well as Army and Fortress units. There was also a 2,000 strong Waffen-SS detachment. The total strength was in excess of 10,000 men. Many of these were remnants of five divisions, which had been mauled during the Normandy campaign, then retreated to Dunkirk. The town was fortified and supplied for a lengthy siege.

The Canadians approached Dunkirk from the south-west. On 7–8 September the 5th Canadian Infantry Brigade captured Bourbourg, about 8.1 mi (13 km) from the city itself. The German outer perimeter ran through the villages of Mardyck, Loon-Plage, Spycker, Bergues and Bray-Dunes, 4.3 to 7.5 mi (7 to 12 km) from Dunkirk. The Calgary Highlanders attacked Loon-Plage on 7 September against very heavy opposition and suffered enough casualties that each of its companies was reduced to less than 30 men. The village was gained on 9 September only when the Germans withdrew. Over the next ten days, Canadian units nibbled away at the German perimeter, taking Coppenaxfort on 9 September, Mardyck on 17 September, both west of the city, Bergues on the 15th and Veurne, Nieuwpoort (assisted by the Witte Brigade (White Brigade) part of the Belgian Resistance) and De Panne, east of Dunkirk, in Belgium. Bray Dunes and nearby Ghyvelde, both just within France, were taken on 15 September, with air support, after initial attacks had failed.

It had become clear that the German defenders could not be expelled without a set-piece assault. Given the need to open the Scheldt estuary to Antwerp and the likelihood that Dunkirk would be of limited use as a port as a result of its demolition, the Canadian units were redeployed. Nearby Ostend (Oostende) had fallen easily to the Canadians when the Germans withdrew and its port was partially opened on 28 September, easing the Allies' supply problems. Dunkirk was no longer worth the effort of its capture.

== Siege ==
The Allied forces around Dunkirk were to contain the German garrison and minimise their inclination to fight on by reconnaissance, artillery and air bombardment and with propaganda. Coastal supply routes used by E-boats of the German navy and air supply drops were to be cut off. Of all of the German fortress garrisons on the Channel coast, Dunkirk appears to have been the most resilient. (Note: At the other channel ports, particularly Calais and Boulogne and the gun sites at Cap Gris Nez were easily persuaded to surrender; those in Dunkirk were more determined and capable of mounting an active defence.) The garrison thwarted early probes by the Canadians with sufficient aggression to dissuade them from a full assault. By this stage, other priorities compelled the Canadians to persist in patrolling and local counter-attacks. On 16 September, the 2nd Canadian Infantry Division was relieved by the 4th SSB. On the night of 26/27 September, the 4th SSB was replaced by the 154th Infantry Brigade, 51st (Highland) Infantry Division. The Germans attempted to take advantage of the change with sorties against the 7th Black Watch in Ghyvelde and against 7th Argylls nearby at Bray-Dunes Plage. Both attacks were repulsed but only after the Argyll headquarters had been partially occupied and houses in Ghyvelde had been destroyed. A truce was negotiated from 3 to 6 October, at the initiative of the French Red Cross, to allow the evacuation of 17,500 French civilians and Allied and German wounded. The truce was extended to allow the Germans to restore defences that had been removed to allow the evacuation.

On 9 October, the 1st Czechoslovak Armoured Brigade took over the siege. Czechoslovaks executed frequent harassing raids into the eastern suburbs to take prisoners; an attack on 28 October (Czechoslovak independence day) took 300 prisoners. There was a flurry of attacks and counter-attacks, mostly on the eastern perimeter during November 1944. Conditions on both sides were difficult in the winter. The low-lying ground outside the city had been flooded to form part of the defences and adjacent land easily became waterlogged, hampering movement and making life unpleasant. Canadian gunners reported that gun-pits needed to be bailed out, the sides of dugouts collapsed and transport became mired. Czechoslovak morale was maintained by leave in nearby towns and in Lille. The defenders were stuck with poor food, deficient health care and harsh discipline.

On 28 April and 2 May 1945 the Germans were able to deliver a limited amount of supplies to the garrison with some of their 28 Seehund two-man midget submarines. These craft were normally armed with two torpedoes mounted on the outside. For the supply missions, the torpedoes were replaced with special food containers ("butter torpedoes"). On the return voyages they used the containers to carry mail from the Dunkirk garrison.

== End of war ==
Handbill thrown from Allied aircraft over the German positions in Dunkirk, April or early May 1945: WARNUNG ! An die deutschen Truppen in DÜNKIRCHEN ! Eure letzte Gelegenheit, Euch der Heeresgruppe Montgomery anzuschliessen, ist bald vorüber. Zeigt weisse Fahnen über Euren Stellungen ! Zur Besprechung der Übergabe wird Admiral Frisius oder ein beglaubigter Vertreter durch die alliierten Linien gelassen. ZG 130 (To the German troops in Dunkirk! Your last opportunity to join Army Group Montgomery will soon be over. Show white flags over your positions! Admiral Frisius will be used to discuss the handover.)

The garrison surrendered unconditionally to Liška on 9 May 1945, two days after the surrender of Nazi Germany was signed and one day after it became effective.

== Orders of battle ==
Allied forces

- 5th Canadian Infantry Brigade (until 18 September)
  - The Black Watch (Royal Highland Regiment) of Canada
  - Le Régiment de Maisonneuve
  - The Calgary Highlanders
  - 5th Canadian Infantry Brigade Ground Defence Platoon (Lorne Scots)
- 4th Special Service Brigade (until 26 September)
- 154th Infantry Brigade (from 26 September – 9 October 1944)
  - 7th Battalion Argyll and Sutherland Highlanders
  - 1st and 7th Battalions Black Watch
- 1st Czechoslovak Armoured Brigade (9 October – 9 May 1945)
  - 1st Czechoslovak Tank Battalion
  - 2nd Czechoslovak Tank Battalion
  - 1st Czechoslovak Motorised Infantry Battalion (two companies)
  - Field Artillery Regiment (two battalions)
  - Anti-tank battalion
  - Armoured Reconnaissance Squadron
  - Field Engineers Company
  - Attached British, French and Canadian units
    - 7th Royal Tank Regiment
    - 2nd Canadian Heavy Anti-aircraft Regiment
    - 109th Heavy Anti-aircraft Regiment, Royal Artillery
    - 125th Light Anti-aircraft Regiment, Royal Artillery
    - French 51st Infantry Regiment (two battalions formed from the French Forces of the Interior (FFI)

German garrison
Elements of:

- 49th Infantry Division
- 226th Infantry Division
- 346th Infantry Division
- 711th Infantry Division
- 97th Infantry Division
  - 26th Fortress Battalion
  - 1046th Fortress Battalion
  - Waffen-SS Reinecke group

== See also ==
- Operation Astonia: capture of Le Havre
- Operation Wellhit: capture of Boulogne
- Operation Undergo: capture of Calais

== Sources ==
- Copp, Terry (2007) [2006]. Cinderella Army: The Canadians in Northwest Europe, 1944–1945. Toronto: University of Toronto Press. ISBN 978-0-8020-9522-0.
- Copp, Terry (2007a) [1992]. The Brigade: The Fifth Canadian Infantry Brigade in World War II (pbk. Stackpole Books, Mechanicsburg, PA ed.). Harrisburg, PA: Fortress. ISBN 978-0-8117-3422-6.
- Ellis, Major L. F.; et al. (2004) [1968]. Butler, Sir James (ed.). Victory in the West: The Defeat of Germany. History of the Second World War, United Kingdom Military Series. Vol. II. Uckfield, UK: Naval & Military Press. ISBN 978-1-84574-059-7.
- Hyrman, Jan (2009). "The port of Dunkirk in WWII". Naše Noviny. Archived from the original on 14 July 2011.
- Michalon, Roger (1980). La Participation des Forces françaises de l'intérieur aux opérations des fronts de l'Atlantique et des Alpes et à la réorganisation de l'armée 1944–1945 [The Participation of the French Forces from the Interior in the Operations of the Atlantic and Alps Fronts and the Reorganization of the Army 1944–1945]. Les Grandes Unités Françaises. Vol. VI. Paris: Imprimerie Nationale (Service historique de l'armée de terre). ISBN 978-2-86323-006-0.
- Monahan, J.W. (1947). The Containing of Dunkirk (PDF). Canadian Participation in the Operations in North-west Europe 1944. Part V: Clearing the Channel Ports, 3 Sep 44 – 6 Feb 45 (Report). CMHQ Reports (184) (online ed.). Historical Section, Canadian Military Headquarters. OCLC 961860099. Archived from the original (PDF) on 19 July 2011.
- Rohwer, Jürgen; Hümmelchen, Gerhard (1992). Chronology of the War at Sea 1939–1945. Annapolis, MD: Naval Institute Press. ISBN 978-1-55750-105-9.
- Stacey, Colonel C. P.; Bond, Major C. C. J. (1960). The Victory Campaign: The operations in North-West Europe 1944–1945 (PDF). Official History of the Canadian Army in the Second World War. Vol. III. The Queen's Printer and Controller of Stationery Ottawa. OCLC 606015967. Archived from the original (PDF) on 21 December 2020.
