= Jan Novotný =

- Born: 17 June 1929; Pustá Polom, Czechoslovakia
- Died: 23 January 2005 (aged 75); Malá Skála, Czech Republic

Jan Novotný (17 June 1929 – 23 January 2005) was a Czech glass artist, painter and art teacher.

== Biography ==
Novotný was born in Pustá Polom, Czechoslovakia and studied at the secondary glass school in Kamenický Šenov and from 1952 at the Academy of Applied Arts in Prague in the studio of prof. Josef Kaplický. From 1959, he was an art teacher at the Secondary School of Art Glass in Železný Brod. In the late 1950s and during the 1960s, he won several significant awards – Silver Medal at XI. Triennale Milan, Honorary Prize at Expo 67 in Montreal. He participated regularly in exhibitions of Czechoslovak glass all over the world. In the 1970s and 1980s, his work was negatively influenced by the adverse attitude of the governing communist regime to his person.

The domain of Jan Novotný is enamelled glass – vases, decorative wall plates and stained glass windows, but in his work he was using other techniques as well – etching, drypoint, blowing or engraving. His creations include also classic paintings, graphics and drawings.

Most of his life he lived and worked in Malá Skála in northeastern Bohemia

== Literature ==
- Ricke, Helmut (2005). Czech Glass 1945-1980: Design in an Age of Adversity. Arnoldsche Verlagsanstalt. p. 448. ISBN 978-3-89790-217-6.
