= Alois Liška =

Czech army officer

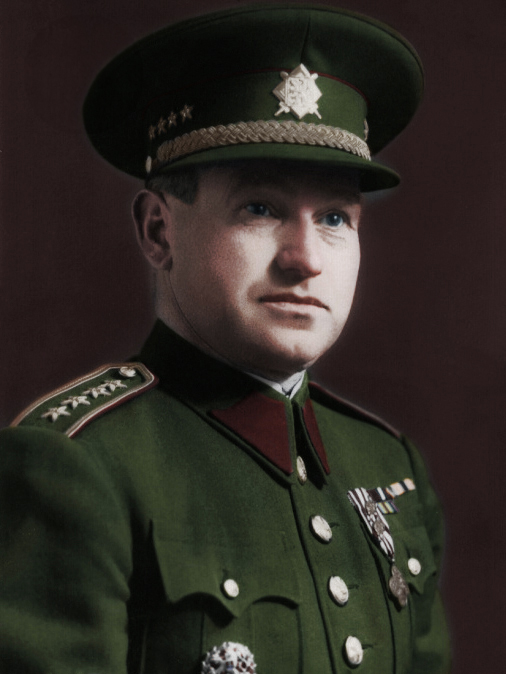
- Portrait of Alois Liška
- Born: 20 November 1895; Záborčí, near Liberec, Kingdom of Bohemia, Austria-Hungary (now Czech Republic)
- Died: 7 February 1977 (aged 81); Putney, London, England, U.K.
- Military career
- Allegiance: Czechoslovakia
- Branch: Czechoslovak Army
- Service years: 1915–1948
- Rank: General
- Commands: 1st Czechoslovak Armoured Brigade
- Conflicts: World War II; Battle of France; Siege of Dunkirk

Alois Liška (1895–1977) was a Czech army officer who served in both World Wars, ultimately as a Brigade General commanding the 1st Czechoslovak Armoured Brigade at Dunkirk in 1944–45. He was born on 20 November 1895 in Záborčí, some 17 kilometres south east of Liberec, and died on 7 February 1977 in Putney, London.

== Early life ==
Liška was one of six siblings. In June 1914, he passed the leaving examination and graduated from Grammar School in Turnov.

== Military service ==
In 1915, during World War I, Liška was conscripted into the Austro–Hungarian Army and posted to the Russian front. He was taken prisoner of war (one source says that he defected) in 1916 on the Russian front and in 1917 he volunteered to join the Czechoslovak Legions in Russia and served with the artillery.

After his return, in 1920, to Czechoslovakia, he joined the Army as a professional officer and served with the 51st Artillery Regiment at Stará Boleslav, rising from a company commander to commanding the regiment. When Germany occupied the Czech lands in 1939, he escaped the country.

During the Battle of France, he commanded the 1st Artillery Regiment and, after the collapse of Allied forces in 1940, he and his regiment were evacuated to Britain. In 1943, Liška was promoted to brigadier general and, from March 1943, he commanded the Czechoslovak Independent Brigade, which subsequently converted to armour as the Czechoslovak Independent Armoured Brigade Group, which subsequently became the 1st Czechoslovak Armoured Brigade. The brigade was moved to France in August 1944 and Liška commanded the siege of Dunkirk from October 1944 to May 1945, accepting the surrender of the German garrison.

== Post-war ==
After the war, Liška returned to Czechoslovakia where he was reunited with his wife and daughter who had been repatriated from concentration camps; his son, Jaroslav, and older brother, Josef, had been shot during death marches. He had been appointed as the Czechoslovak Army's Chief of Staff in April 1945 by President Edvard Beneš, but this was vetoed by the Soviet authorities and instead he became commander of the Military College and was promoted to general in 1946. The Communist takeover in 1948 and consequent purges of formerly London-based officers, however, led to his dismissal from the Army and obliged him to leave his country once again, without his family.

Alois Liška died in Putney, London, in 1977. He was posthumously awarded the Milan Rastislav Stefanik Order, 3rd class in 1991.
