= Ivana Mašitová =

Czech glass artist

- Born: 27 June 1961 (age 64); Česká Lípa, Czechoslovakia
- Education: UMPRUM Academy of Applied Arts, Atelier of Professor Stanislav Libenský and Jaroslava Brychtová, Prague, Czechoslovakia (nowadays the Czech Republic)
- Occupation: Glass Artist
- Website: http://www.ivanamasitova.com/

Ivana Mašitová is a Czech glass artist. She creates mainly cast glass sculptures. Her works are included in many major modern art collections, such as the Victoria & Albert Museum (London, United Kingdom), Corning Museum of Glass (New York, USA), National Museum of Modern Art (Tokyo, Japan), National Gallery Prague (the Czech Republic), and many others.

She was a student of Stanislav Libenský in Prague, Czech Republic.

== Education ==
- 1980–1988: Academy of Applied Arts, Prague, Czechoslovakia (now the Czech Republic)
- Atelier of Stanislav Libenský and Jaroslava Brychtová
- 1976–1980: Kamenický Šenov Glassmaking School, Kamenický Šenov, Czechoslovakia

== Public collections ==
- Victoria and Albert Museum, London, UK
- Corning Museum of Glass, New York, USA
- Brooklyn Museum, New York, USA
- National Museum of Modern Art, Tokyo, Japan
- Museum voor Sierkunst, Gent, Belgium
- Schloss Rosenau, Coburg- Museum Of Modern Glass(Europäisches Museum für modernes Glas, Coburg, Germany
- National Gallery Prague, Prague, the Czech Republic
- Museum of Decorative Arts in Prague, Prague, the Czech Republic
- Regional museum in Zdar nad Sazavou, Žďár nad Sázavou, the Czech Republic
- Moravian Gallery, Brno, the Czech Republic
- Museum of Glass and Jewellery, Jablonec nad Nisou, the Czech Republic
- East Bohemian Museum, Pardubice, the Czech Republic

== Awards ==
- 2021 Artist of the Month | December 2021, Art Alliance for Contemporary Glass, Dallas, Texas, USA
- 2021 Bronze Medal "Lorenzo il Magnifico"- International Award Winner for Sculpture ROYAL (Collection Mysterious Fans), Florence Biennale, XIII.International Exhibition of Contemporary Art and Design, Florence, Italy
- 1989 1st Prize - Glass Sculpture, Jugend-Gestaltet-Prize, Munich, Germany

== Exhibitions ==
- 2023 Czech Glass Masters, Consulate General of the Czech Republic, Istanbul, Turkey (24Oct - 26Oct)
- 2023 IV. International Biennale of Glass, Sofia, Bulgaria (6Oct - 3Dec)
- 2023 The Old Royal Palace - Theresian Wing, Prague Castle, Prague, the Czech Republic

- Stanislav Libenský Award 2023 International Glass Exhibition (6Sep - 23Sep)

- 2023 Glasgalerie Stölting, Hamburg, Germany
- 2023 The Gallery at Four India St., Nantucket, Massachusetts, USA
- 2023 Habatat Galleries, Winston-Salem, North Carolina, USA
- 2023 Red Moon Contemporary Art Glass Gallery, Melbourne, Australia

- Melbourne Design Week

- 2023 Broft Galleries, Lerdamm, the Netherlands
- 2023 Contemporary Glass Society UK, United Kingdom

- Expanding Boundaries

- 2022 Red Moon Contemporary Art Glass Gallery, Melbourne, Australia

- Europe Contemporary Art Glass Exhibition

- 2022 Habatat Detroit Fine Art, Royal Oak, Michigan, USA

- Glass Art Fair 2022 - Habatat's 50th Glass International Exhibition - UN International Year of Glass 2022

- 2021 Habatat Galleries, West Palm Beach, Florida, USA

- SOLO EXHIBITION (1Dec - 31Dec)

- 2021 International Biennale of Glass, Sofia, Bulgaria
- 2021 Florence Biennale XIII.International Exhibition of Contemporary Art and Design, Florence, Italy
- 2021 Broft Galleries, Lerdamm, the Netherlands

- SOLO EXHIBITION

- 2019 The International Exhibition of Glass, Kanazawa, Japan
- 2017 Tyler Gallery, Vienna, Austria
- 2015 Glass Gallery, Rouen, France
- 2014 Gallery of Art, Hamburg, Germany
- 2013 Czech Glass, Köln Am Rhein, Germany
- 2012 Gallery Transparence, Bruxelles, Belgium
- 2012 Festival of Glass, Abu Dhabi, United Arab Emirates
- 2011 Art Glass Gallery, Villach, Austria
- 2009 Czech Glass, Dubai, United Arab Emirates
- 2008 Czech Glass, Bangkok, Thailand
- 2007 Glass Gallery, Hokkaido, Japan
- 2006 Art Museum, Taipei, Tchaj-wan
- 2005 Glass Gallery, Schalkwijk, the Netherlands
- 2004 Gallery Clara Scremini, Paris, France
- 2003 Prof. Libenský and his students, Chicago, USA
- 2002 Stanislav Libenský and his School, Taipei Fine Arts Museum, Tchaj-wan
- 2000 Maureen Littleton Gallery, Washington DC, USA
- 2000 Contemporary Czech Glass Sculpture, Takayama Museum, Japan
- 1999 Nakama Gallery, Tokyo, Japan
- 1998 Czech Glass, Heilbronn, Germany
- 1998 Glass in Architecture, Beijing, China
- 1997 Plaza Art Gallery, Toyama, Japan
- 1996 Studio Glass Gallery, London, UK
- 1996 Art Temporis, Paris, France
- 1995 Gallery Groeneveld, Almeo, the Netherlands
- 1995 BGallery, Baden Baden, Germany
- 1995 Gallery Prager Cabinet, Salzburg, Austria
- 1994 Gallery Sanske, Zürich, Switzerland
- 1994 World Glass Now, Sapporo, Japan
- 1994 World Glass Now, Hiroshima | Tokyo | Osaka, Japan
- 1993 Days of Czech Culture, Munich, Germany
- 1993 Center of Art Glass, Amsterdam, the Netherlands
- 1993 Art Glass Centre, Schalkwijk, the Netherlands
- 1993 Glass Prague Prize, Prague, the Czech Republic
- 1993 Heller Gallery, New York, USA
- 1992 Miller Gallery, New York, USA
- 1992 Glass Gallery, Grabenhof, Austria
- 1992 The Azabu Museum of Arts, Tokyo, Japan
- 1991 OB ART, Paris, France
- 1991 Glass Gallery Hittfeld, Hamburg, Germany
- 1991 Exposition Internationale Glass, Rouen, France
- 1991 Configura 1, Fine Art in Europe, Erfurt, Germany
- 1990 Essener Glass Gallery, Essen, Germany
- 1990 Congress House, Munich, Germany
- 1990 Trade Fair of Arts, Barcelona, Spain
- 1989 Jugend-Gestaltet-Preis, Munich, Germany
- 1989 Gallery Transparence, Bruxelles, Belgium
- 1989 Czechoslovak Glass Art, Chartres, France
