= Stanislav Libenský and Jaroslava Brychtová =

Czech contemporary artists

Stanislav Libenský
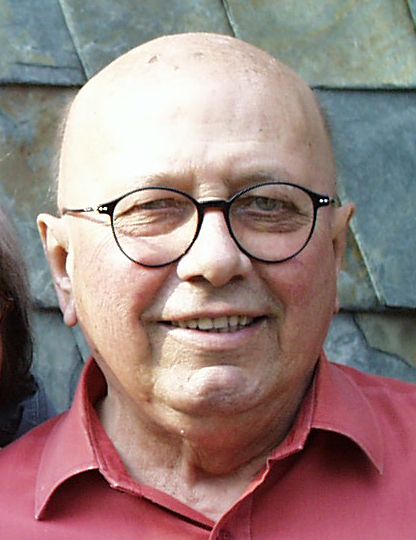
- Stanislav Libenský in 1999
- Born: 27 March 1921; Sezemice, Czechoslovakia
- Died: 24 February 2002 (aged 80); Železný Brod, Czech Republic
- Occupations: Artist, educator
- Known for: artistic collaboration with Jaroslava Brychtová

Jaroslava Brychtová
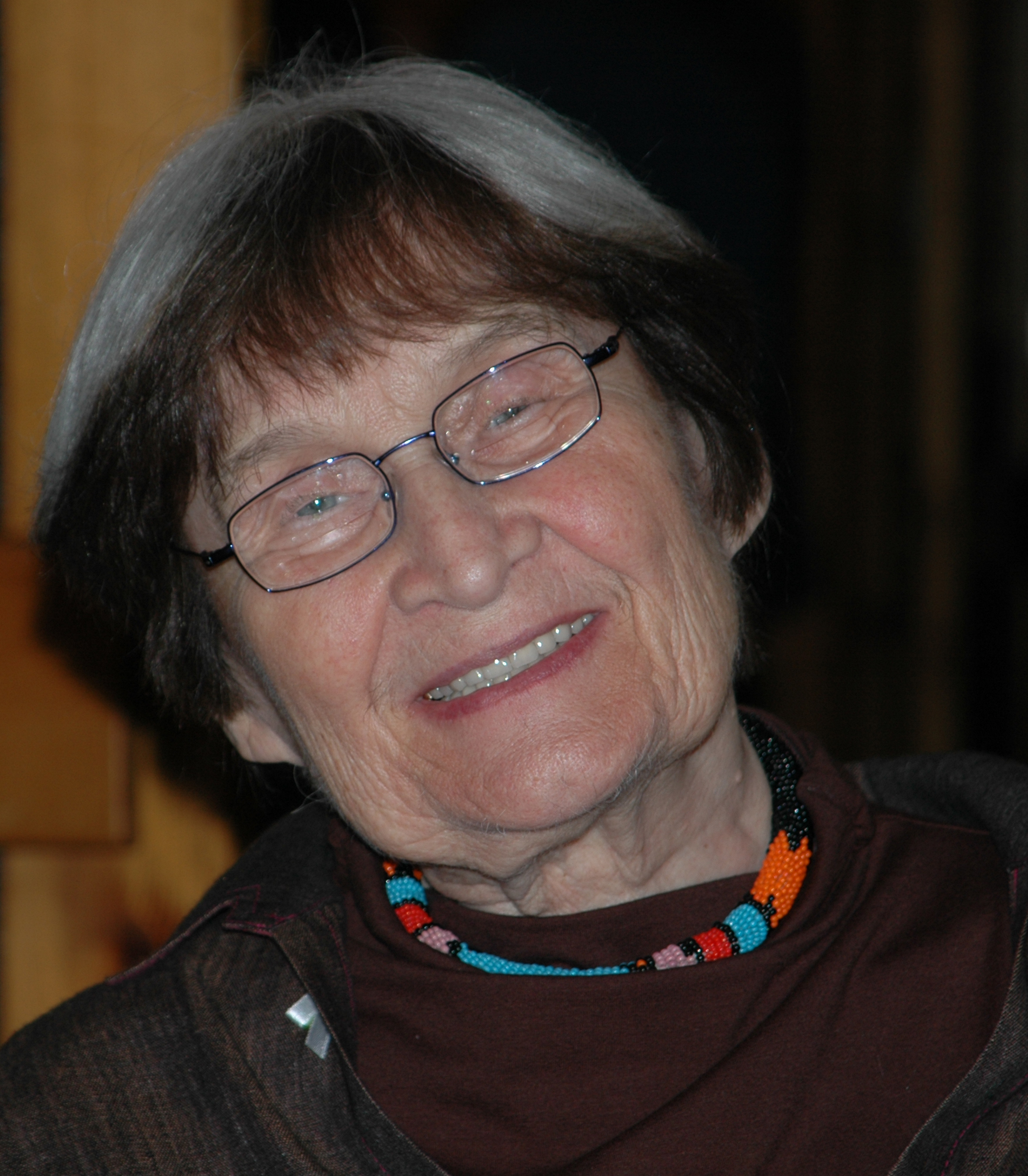
- Jaroslava Brychtová in 2005
- Born: 18 July 1924; Železný Brod, Czechoslovakia
- Died: 8 April 2020 (aged 95); Jablonec nad Nisou, Czech Republic
- Occupation: Artist
- Known for: artistic collaboration with Stanislav Libenský

Stanislav Libenský (27 March 1921 – 24 February 2002) and Jaroslava Brychtová (18 July 1924 – 8 April 2020) were Czech contemporary artists. Their works are included in many major modern art collections, such as the Metropolitan Museum of Art and the Victoria & Albert Museum.

Jaroslava Brychtová, a sculptor, and Stanislav Libenský, originally a painter and later a glass artist, met in 1954. They married in 1963 and worked together until Libenský's death. Libenský painted and sketched the designs, and Brychtová made clay sculptures from his designs. Since Libenský's death, Brychtová continued to produce castings. Their work is characterised by simple block shapes infused with subtle colours and nuances.

== Education and artistic partnership ==
Stanislav Libenský began his study of glass in 1937 at the Specialized School of Glassmaking in Nový Bor, Czechoslovakia, in the Sudetenland region. When the German army occupied the Sudetenland in 1938, Libenský moved first to the school at Železný Brod, and later to Prague Academy of Arts, Architecture and Design (VŠUP), from which he graduated in 1944. His first notable series in glass, created in Nový Bor between 1945 and 1948, were thin crystal vessels, delicately etched and enameled with themes from the Bible and Renaissance art.

In 1948 Libenský returned to VŠUP, where he studied under Josef Kaplický, a painter, sculptor and architect who headed the school of painting on glass. Through his dynamic teaching style and modernist ideas, Kaplický had a tremendous influence on his students and thus on the independence of glass as an art form in Czechoslovakia. In 1953 Libenský returned to Železný Brod to become the director of the Specialized School of Glassmaking. It was during that time that he met Jaroslava Brychtová, the daughter of the school's co-founder, Jaroslav Brychta.

Jaroslava Brychtová began to experiment with casting and carving glass in the late 1940s. She founded the Center for Architectural Glass at the Specialized School of Glassmaking in 1950. Like Libenský, Brychtová studied at VŠUP. The war interrupted her education, but she later finished her studies with a concentration in sculpture. Her teachers were Karel Štipl (from 1945 to 1951) and Jan Lauda (from 1947 to 1950). Jaroslava Brychtová's career at the Specialized School of Glassmaking in Železný Brod spanned 1950 to 1984. The couple began their long collaboration in 1954, when Brychtová created a sculptural glass bowl modeled after a sketch of a bowl-shaped head that Libenský had made. According to Libenský, the two worked well together because he was trained as a painter, and she as a sculptor.

Libenský and Brychtová married in 1963.

== 1958 Brussels Expo ==
The Czechoslovak pavilion at the EXPO '58 in Brussels garnered attention for its modern architectural design, its film, acting and ballet presentations, it was Czech glass that attracted the attention of the judges. The entry designed by Libenský and Brychtová, "Animal Reliefs" (later known as "Zoomorphic Stones"), were cast glass "stones". These were smooth on the obverse; on the reverse, animals inspired by the cave paintings of Altamira and Lascaux were cast in negative low relief. The effect presented by this, when viewed through the smooth surface of the glass, is of a three-dimensional form captured within its depths. Incorporated into a concrete wall in the pavilion's "Glass" gallery, "Animal Reliefs" was awarded a Grand Prix. While the original work did not survive, a recreation of it was installed in the United Nations headquarters in Geneva. In developing the negative modeling technique employed in "Animal Reliefs", Brychtová and Libenský created the foundation on which the majority of their later sculptural work was based.

== Prague Academy of Arts, Architecture and Design (VŠUP) ==
Josef Kaplický's death in 1962 left a void at VŠUP that was filled by Libenský, who was appointed a professor in the glass department in 1963. Libenský was an excellent teacher who respected the tradition of glass in Czechoslovakia while furthering his own ideas about the modern direction of glass art. His career at the academy lasted nearly one-quarter of a century. During that time, despite the opposition of the Communist government that had taken hold of the country in the late 1940s, Libenský was able not only to influence two generations of glass artists through his teaching but also, through international lecturing and exhibition of his and Jaroslava Brychtová's works, build international interest in modern Czech glass art. Notable students of Professor Libenský include František Janák, Marian Karel, Ivana Mašitová, Yan Zoritchak (Ján Zoričák), and Alena Bílková.

== Architectural commissions ==
Much of Libenský and Brychtová's architectural work was done for buildings in Czechoslovakia, including two windows, created for the St. Wenceslas Chapel in Prague's St. Vitus Cathedral. Built in the fourteenth century, the historic chapel was reconstructed by the Czech government between 1961 and 1964. Libenský and Brychtová were selected by competition to replace the chapel's original stained glass windows, which dated from 1912 to 1913. The artists created an abstract design for the windows that, in its modern simplicity, departed from the ornate, early sixteenth-century decoration of the chapel. To relate the new to the old, Libenský and Brychtová used the muted grey-brown, grey-green and pink hues in the chapel's frescoes as the predominant colors in their windows. Outside of Czechoslovakia their architectural glass work was seen in World's Fair exhibitions and Czech Embassies. At Expo 67 in Montreal, Canada, they created three large sculptures for the Czechoslovak Pavilion's "Hall of Century and Traditions". These were "Blue Concretion", "Sun of the Century", and "Large Conus". According to Corning Museum of Glass curator Tina Oldknow, these large-scale sculptures in glass were "a revelation" to the American Studio Glass artists who saw them, including Harvey Littleton, Dale Chihuly and Marvin Lipofsky.

== Honors and awards ==
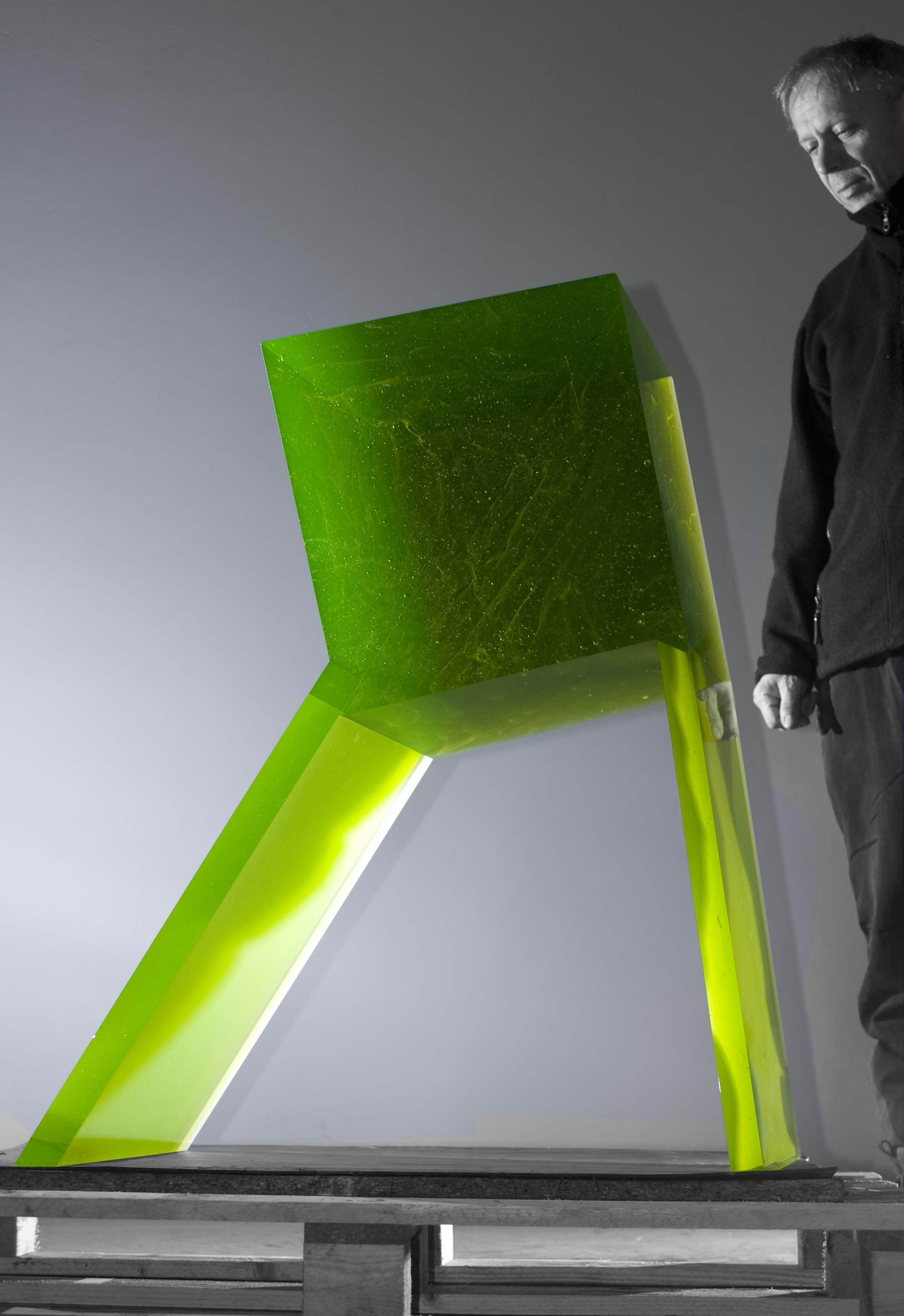
Metamorphosis 2007

Libenský was awarded honorary doctorates by the Royal College of Art in London in 1994, the Academy of Arts, Architecture and Design in Prague in 2001, and together with Brychtová, by the University of Sunderland in 1999 and the Rhode Island School of Design in 2000. In 1985 he was named a Chevalier of the Ordre des Arts et Lettres by the Ministry of Culture in Paris, France. He won the Herder Prize from the University of Vienna, Austria, in 1975. With his wife and collaborative partner, Jaroslava Brychtová, Libenský was accorded a number of honors. The pair were presented with a Lifetime Achievement Award from Urbanglass in Brooklyn, New York, and the Glass Art Society in 1997 and 1996, respectively. They won the Bavarian State Prize and gold medal at the Internationale Handwerksmesse in Munich, Germany, in 1995 and 1967, and received Gold Medal awards from Internationales Kunsthandwerk in Stuttgart, Germany, in 1969 and at the VIII São Paulo Art Biennial, Brazil, in 1965. Libenský and Brychtová were presented with the Rakow Award for Excellence in Glass from the Corning Museum of Glass in 1984. They received the 1958 Grand Prize at Expo 58 in Brussels, Belgium.

== Collections ==
The work of Libenský and Brychtová has been collected by public institutions world-wide, including the Metropolitan Museum of Art, New York, NY; Art Gallery of Western Australia in Perth; Prague National Museum, Prague, Czech Republic; Cafesjian Museum of Art, Yerevan, Armenia; Museum Bellrive, Zurich, Switzerland; Finnish Glass Museum, Riihimäki; Victoria and Albert Museum, London; Hokkaidō Museum of Modern Art, Sapporo, Japan; National Museum of Modern Art, Tokyo, Japan; Rijksmuseum Amsterdam; Corning Museum of Glass, Corning, New York; Los Angeles County Museum of Art, Los Angeles, California, Toledo Museum of Art, Toledo, Ohio; and Museum Jan van der Togt, Amstelveen, the Netherlands; Musée des Arts Décoratifs, Paris, France, Achilles Foundation Glass Museum, Hamburg, Germany and Museum of Modern Art, Rio de Janeiro, Brazil.
