= Marie Fabianová =

Czech mathematician and teacher (1872–1943)

- Born: 11 February 1872; Železný Brod, Bohemia, Austria-Hungary
- Died: 7 April 1943 (aged 71); Prague, Protectorate of Bohemia and Moravia
- Education: Charles-Ferdinand University
- Occupations: Mathematician, teacher
- Known for: First female PhD graduate in math from Charles-Ferdinand University

Marie Fabianová (also written as Marie Fabiánová; 11 February 1872 – 7 April 1943) was a Czech mathematician, teacher and school principal, suffragette and feminist. She was one of the first Czech women to obtain a university education, the second female graduate of Charles-Ferdinand University, and the first female to graduate with a PhD in math from the University.

== Biography ==
Fabianová was born 11 February 1872 in Železný Brod into the family of Václav Fabián, the chief engineer of the Austrian Northwestern Railway, and his wife Juliana, née Haklová. She had two siblings, Juliana and Václav. After graduating from a local school, she began studying in Prague at the first, newly opened (1890), private girls' grammar school in Central Europe, called Minerva.

After graduating from grammar school in 1895, she began to study mathematics at the Faculty of Philosophy of Charles-Ferdinand University in Prague under Professor František Josef Studnička. Until 1900, girls attended lectures for residential studies (without the status of regular students); in 1900, a new law enabled girls to take exams for the entire period of their studies. Fabianová graduated in November 1901 with a thesis in analytical mathematics becoming the first woman to earn a PhD in mathematics in the country. (In 1902, Anna Honzáková, a classmate of Fabianová's from Minerva, was the very first female with a doctoral degree to graduate from the Faculty of Medicine of Charles-Ferdinand University.)

After graduation, Fabianová started teaching mathematics, physics and German at the Minerva gymnasium. At that time, the teaching profession was associated with a promise of celibacy, so Fabianová never married. She lived with her older sister Juliana Fabianová.

In 1923, she separated from Minerva to become the director of the Second Czech Girls' Real Municipal Gymnasium. She held that position until she retired in 1929. In retirement, she participated in Czech social activities. She was a member of the Union of Czechoslovak Mathematicians and Physicists, the Association of Academically Educated Women and the Minerva Association.

Marie Fabianová died on 7 April 1943 after a long illness in the General Faculty Hospital in Prague at the age of 70.

== Selected publications ==
=== Scientific works ===
- On the discovery of Zeeman. Journal for the cultivation of mathematics and physics. 1893.
- On the development of diperiodic functions in infinite sums and products, in series and products. Dissertation. FK Studnička. 1900.

=== Literary works ===
She allegedly used the pseudonym Dr. Abby Faimon.

- FAIMONOVA Abby History of Austrian education. Part 1-2 of the Šolc handbook for teachers of public and municipal schools.
