= Střevelná =

Coordinates: 50°39′N 15°17′E

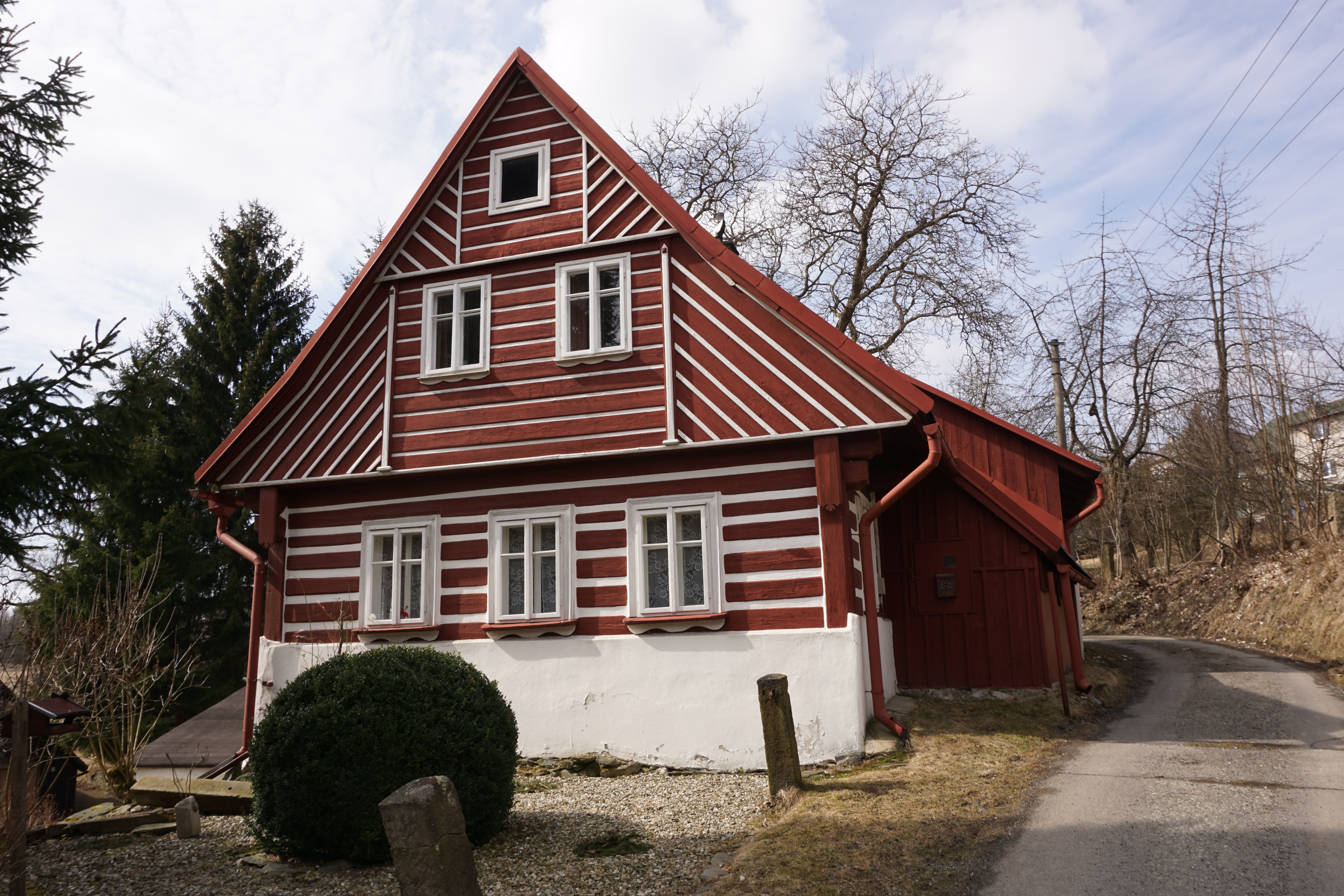
Cottage no. 4 in Střevelná

Střevelná is a small village in the Czech Republic which forms part of the town municipality of Železný Brod near Jablonec nad Nisou.
