= Pravoslav Rada =

Czech artist

Pravoslav Rada (14 October 1923 in Železný Brod – 23 April 2011) was a Czech artist who maintained a particular interest in ceramics.

In 1956 he attended the Congress of Alba and signed to the Final Resolution of the Alba Congress.
