= 1st Czechoslovak Independent Armoured Brigade =

- Československá samostatná obrněná brigáda
- Active: September 1943 – May 1945
- Country: Czechoslovakia
- Allegiance: Czechoslovak government-in-exile, formation equipped and supplied by the United Kingdom
- Branch: Army
- Type: Armoured
- Size: Brigade
- Part of: 21st Army Group
- Engagements: Siege of Dunkirk (1944)

Commanders
- Notable commanders: Major-general Alois Liška

The 1st Czechoslovak Independent Armoured Brigade Group (Czech: Československá samostatná obrněná brigáda, Slovak: Československá samostatná obrnená brigáda) was an armoured unit of expatriate Czechoslovaks organised and equipped by the United Kingdom during the Second World War in 1943.

The brigade landed in Normandy in August 1944 and was given the mission of containing the German-held port of Dunkirk for the rest of the war in Europe. In May 1945, the brigade moved to Czechoslovakia and was absorbed into the Czechoslovak Army.

== Formation ==
The 1st Czechoslovak Armoured Brigade was created on 1 September 1943, when the 1st Czechoslovak Independent Brigade (itself originally formed as 1st Czechoslovak Mixed Brigade in July 1940 from remnants of the 1st Czechoslovak Division serving in the French Army) converted to armour and was renamed the 1st Czechoslovak Independent Armoured Brigade Group (this was often simplified to 1st Czechoslovak Armoured Brigade or abbreviated 1st CIABG). The brigade was under the command of Major General Alois Liška. The motorised infantry battalion of the brigade traced its lineage back to Czechoslovak units that had fought in Libya and Lebanon, notably the 11th Infantry Battalion which took part in the defence of Tobruk.

== Siege of Dunkirk ==
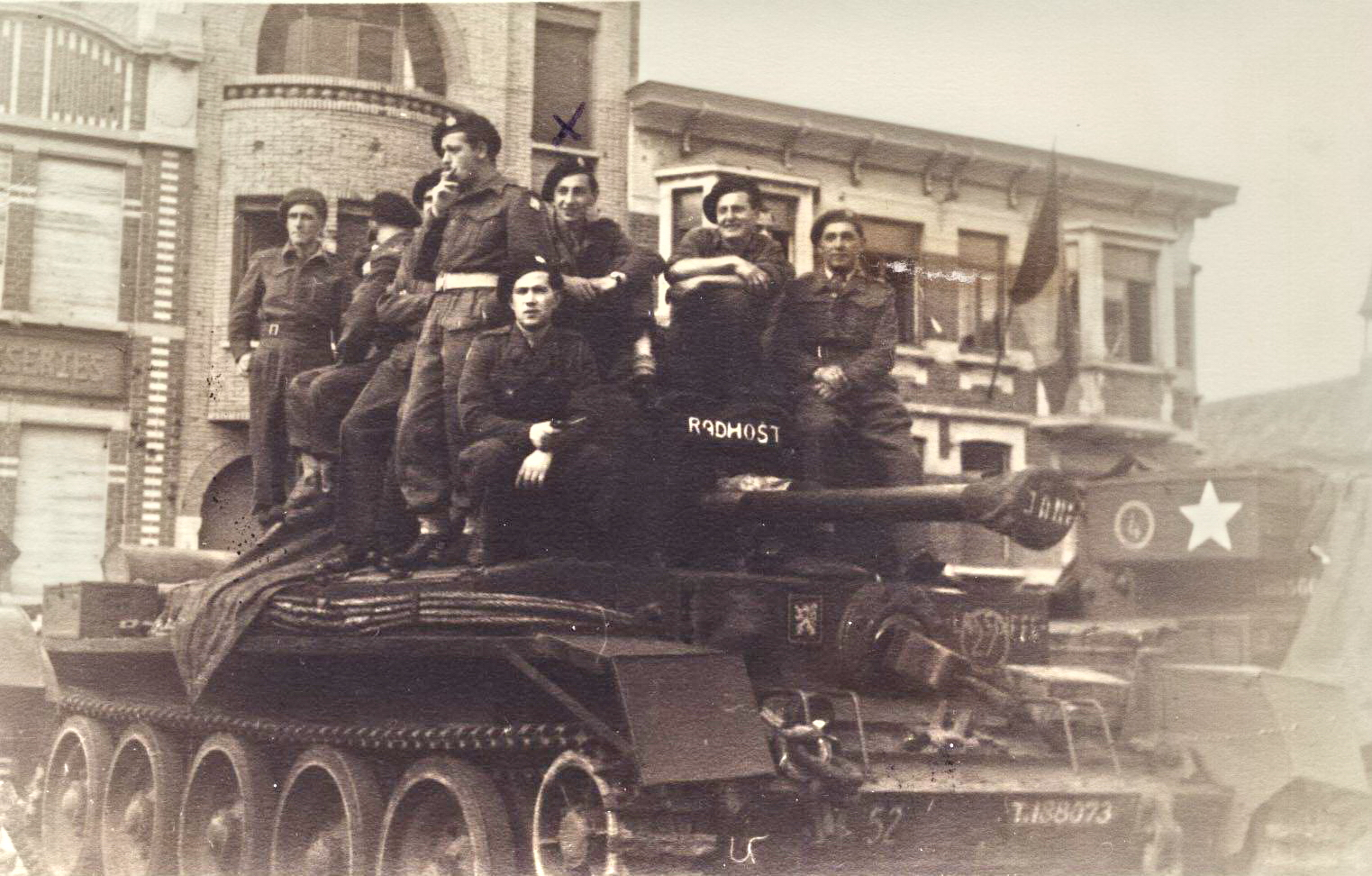
A Cromwell tank of the Czechoslovak Armoured Brigade at De Panne, Belgium in 1945

The formation continued to train in the UK until the summer of 1944 when, with some 4,000 troops under command, it moved to Normandy, joining 21st Army Group at Falaise on 30 August. On 6 October, the brigade advanced to Dunkirk, northern France, and relieved the 154 (Highland) Infantry Brigade on the eastern side of fortress Dunkirk. The brigade was subordinated to the First Canadian Army, which was responsible for the conduct of the siege.

The brigade's tank units were primarily equipped with the Cromwell tank and a number of 17-pounder Sherman tanks (Sherman Firefly), Cruiser Mk VIII Challenger tanks and M5 Stuart light tanks. Crusader AA tanks were dispatched with the brigade but believed not to have been used. They were supported by a Motor Battalion in M5 Half-tracks and Universal Carriers, an anti-tank battery of 12 Ordnance QF 17-pounder anti-tank guns and a Field Artillery Regiment of two batteries of Ordnance QF 25 pounder gun-howitzers. The unit was supported by a Reconnaissance Squadron that used Humber Light Reconnaissance Cars, M5 Stuarts, Humber scout cars and Cromwell tanks.

1st Brigade spent the remainder of the war at Dunkirk, alternately attacking and being attacked by the energetic German garrison, including a successful major raid on German positions on 28 October 1944, Czechoslovak Independence Day. During that time, the brigade was reinforced by French units formed from local French Forces of the Interior (FFI) troops; on 15 October, these were amalgamated into the 110th FFI Infantry Regiment with two battalions allocated for the Siege of Dunkirk. On 24 January 1945, the 110th FFI Regiment was disbanded, with two its battalions and two other FFI battalions used to re-form the French 51st Infantry Regiment, a unit of the regular army. Various British and Canadian formations also supported the siege at one time or another.

In November, the brigade passed from the First Canadian Army to the 21st Army Group. In the spring of 1945, the 1st Armoured Brigade Group was expanded to 5,900 Czechoslovak officers and men, some of whom came from nationals recruited in liberated France and a significant group of a tank battalion, an artillery regiment, a motor transport company and a company of engineers from Czechs and Slovaks forced to serve in the Wehrmacht and who were captured by the Allies in Normandy.

== Return to Czechoslovakia ==
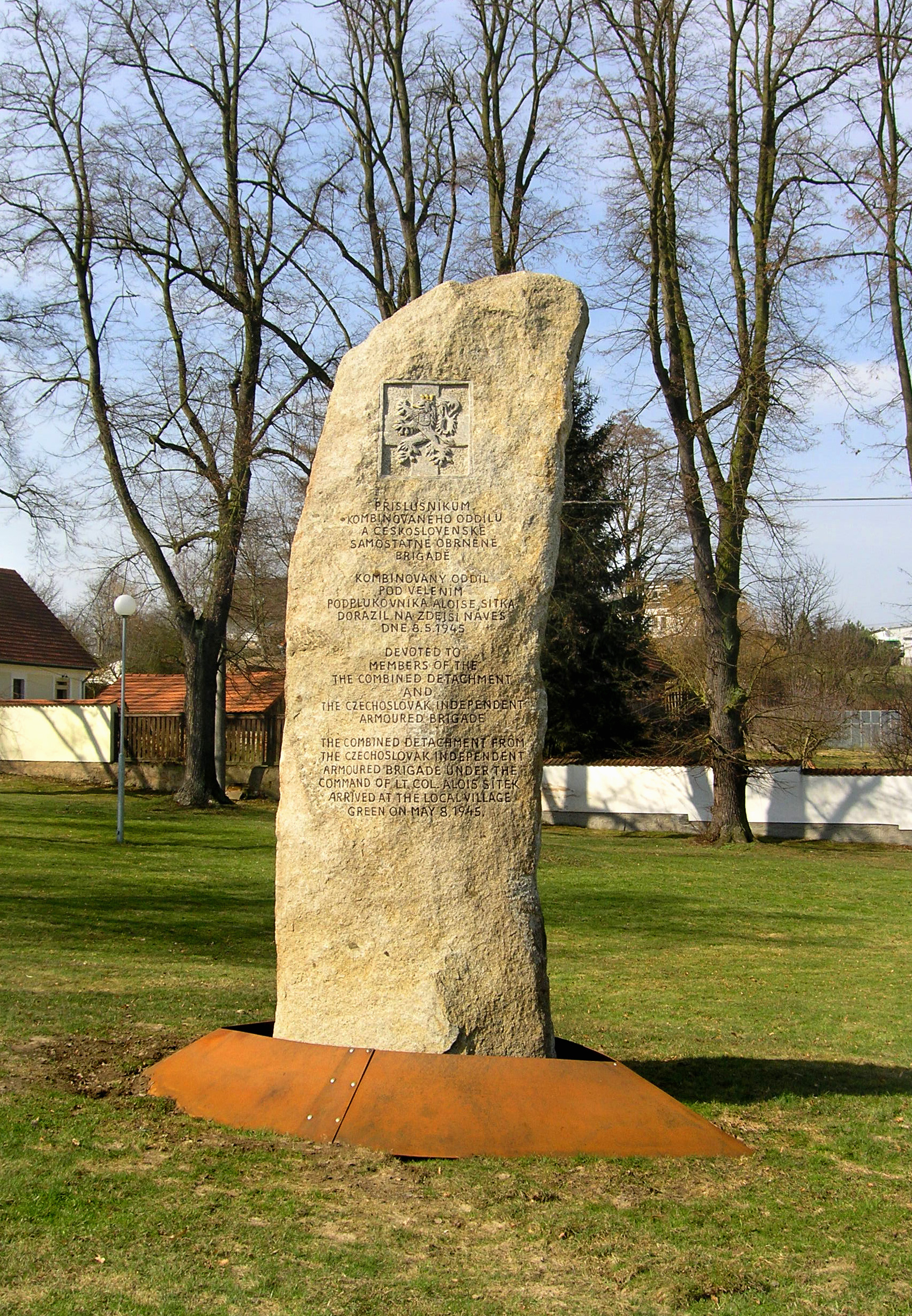
Memorial to members of the combined detachment and the Czechoslovak Independent Armoured Brigade in Kyšice by Plzeň

On 23 April, a symbolic 140-men strong unit detached from the troops besieging Dunkirk, led by Major Sítek, joined with the 3rd US Army and raised the Czechoslovak flag on its homeland border crossing on 1 May 1945 at Cheb.

The Dunkirk garrison did not surrender until after the surrender of Germany, 9 May 1945, when 15,500 German troops and three U-boats were captured by the Czechoslovaks. The brigade then marched to Prague, reaching the city on 18 May 1945, eight days after the arrival of Soviet-sponsored Czechoslovak troops commanded by Ludvík Svoboda.

During the siege of Dunkirk, the Czechoslovak Armoured Brigade suffered 668 casualties; 167 dead, 461 wounded, and 40 missing.

== Order of battle ==
Organization in September 1944:

1st Czechoslovak Tank Battalion
2nd Czechoslovak Tank Battalion
1st Czechoslovak Motorized Infantry Battalion (two companies)
Artillery regiment (two batteries)
Anti-tank battalion
Engineer battalion (two companies)
Reconnaissance squadron (became 3rd Czechoslovak Tank Battalion in late 1944)

Organization in May 1945:

1st Czechoslovak Tank Battalion
2nd Czechoslovak Tank Battalion
3rd Czechoslovak Tank Battalion
1st Czechoslovak Motorized Infantry Battalion (three companies)
Artillery regiment (three batteries)
Anti-tank battalion
Engineer battalion (three companies)
