= Sezemice (Mladá Boleslav District) =

- Municipality
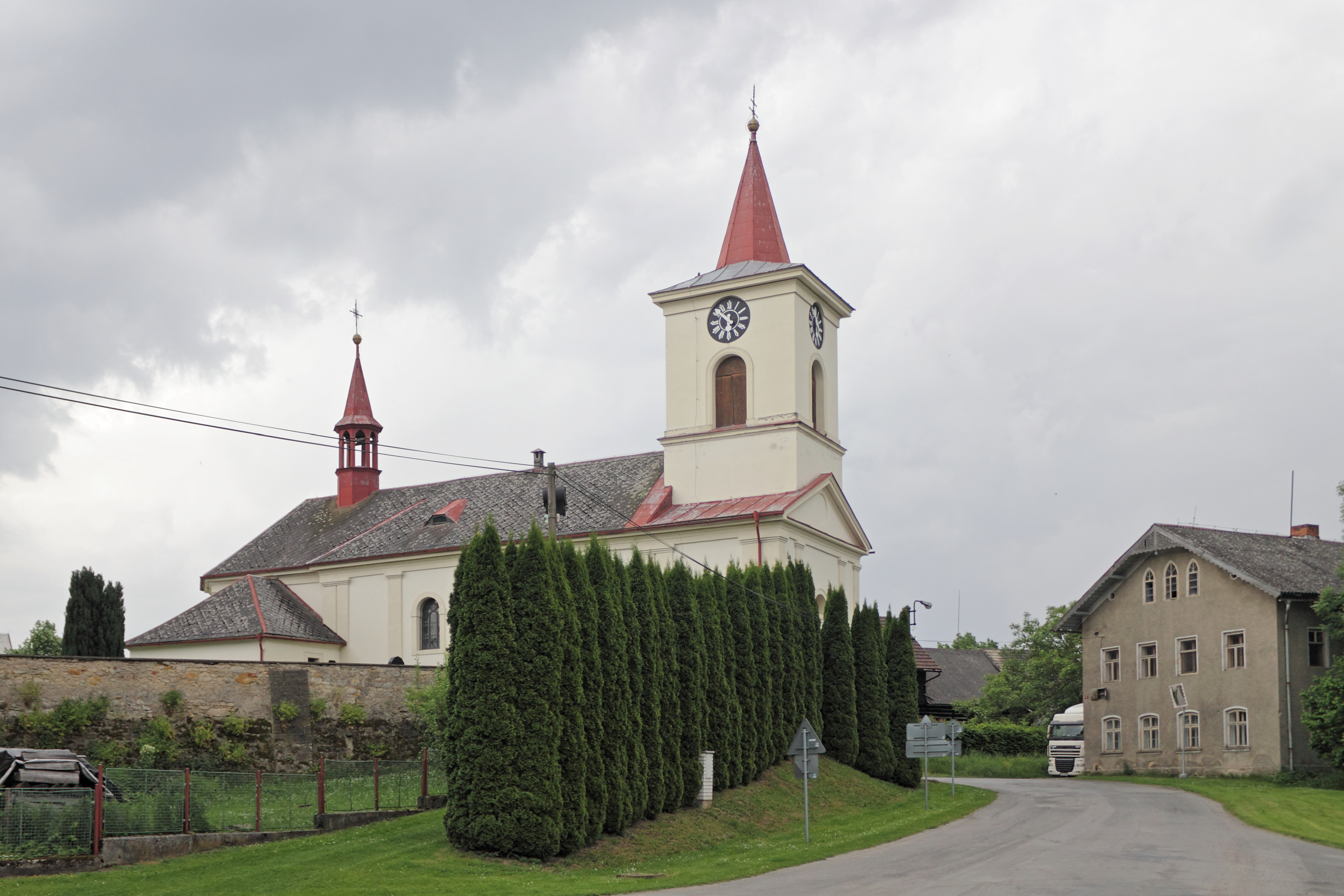
- Church of Saint Bartholomew

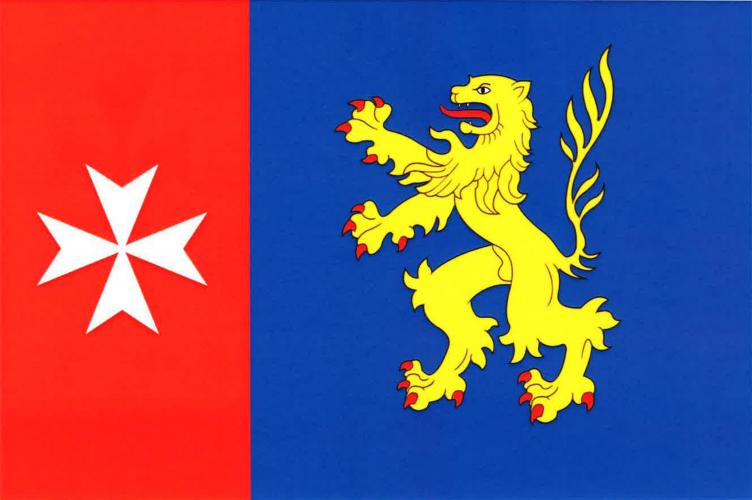
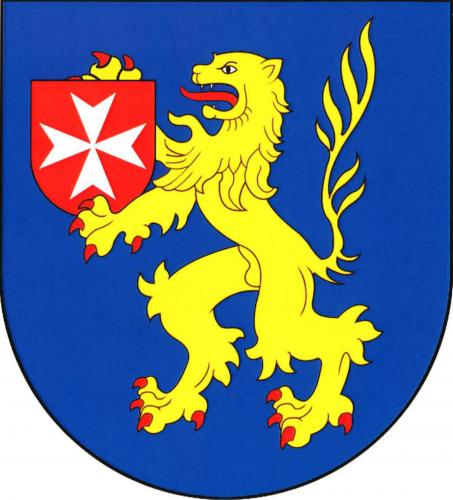
- Flag Coat of arms

- Location in the Czech Republic
- Coordinates: 50°35′8″N 15°0′19″E
- Country: Czech Republic
- Region: Central Bohemian
- District: Mladá Boleslav
- First mentioned: 1115

Area
  - Total: 4.40 km^{2} (1.70 sq mi)
- Elevation: 291 m (955 ft)

Population (2026-01-01)
  - Total: 125
  - Density: 28.4/km^{2} (73.6/sq mi)
- Time zone: UTC+1 (CET)
  - Summer (DST): UTC+2 (CEST)
- Postal code: 294 11
- Website: obecsezemice.cz

Sezemice is a municipality and village in Mladá Boleslav District in the Central Bohemian Region of the Czech Republic. It has about 100 inhabitants.

== Administrative division ==
Sezemice consists of two municipal parts (in brackets population according to the 2021 census):

- Sezemice (99)
- Jirsko 1.díl (9)

== Etymology ==
The name is derived from the personal name Sezema, meaning "the village of Sezema's people".

== Geography ==
Sezemice is located about 19 kilometres (12 mi) north of Mladá Boleslav and 18 km (11 mi) south of Liberec. It lies in the Jičín Uplands. The highest point is at 350 m (1,150 ft) above sea level.

== History ==
The first written mention of Sezemice is from 1115, when Duke Vladislaus I donated the village to the newly established monastery in Kladruby. The owners of the village included Jan Čapek of Sány and the Vartenberk family. From the mid-16th century until the 19th century, Sezemice was part of the Svijany estate and shared its owners, among whom were the families of Vartenberk, Schlick and Waldstein.

== Demographics ==
Historical population

Year	Pop.	±%
1869	321	—
1880	309	−3.7%
1890	287	−7.1%
1900	304	+5.9%
1910	273	−10.2%

Year	Pop.	±%
1921	289	+5.9%
1930	265	−8.3%
1950	209	−21.1%
1961	196	−6.2%
1970	166	−15.3%

Year	Pop.	±%
1980	142	−14.5%
1991	108	−23.9%
2001	103	−4.6%
2011	109	+5.8%
2021	108	−0.9%

Source: Censuses

== Transport ==
There are no railways or major roads passing through the municipality.

== Sights ==
The main landmark of Sezemice is the Church of Saint Bartholomew. Its existence was first documented in 1352. In 1852–1856, the church was rebuilt into its current Empire form.

== Notable people ==
- Stanislav Libenský (1921–2002), contemporary artist
