= Malá Skála =

- Municipality
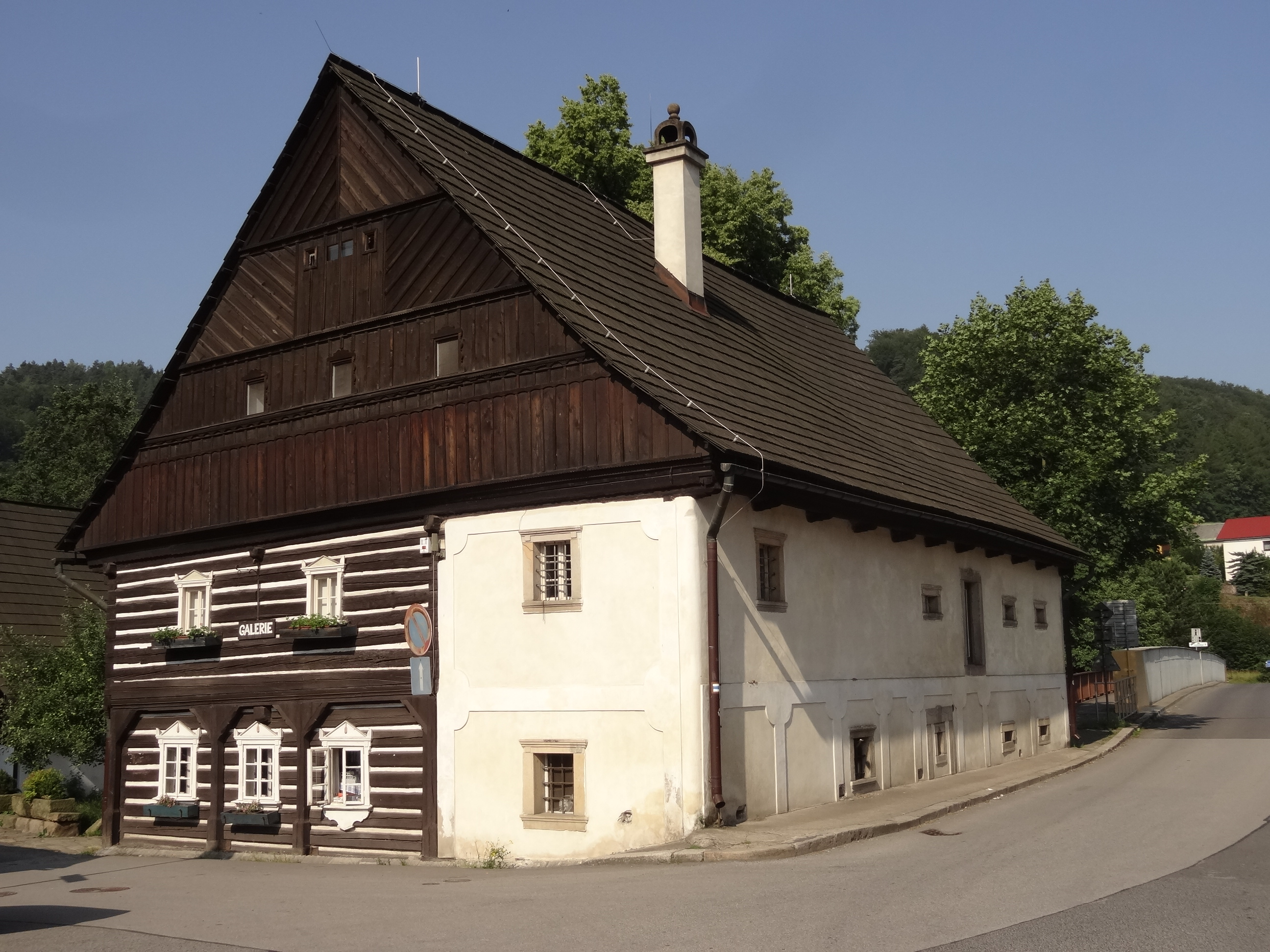
- Bouček's Farmhouse

- Location in the Czech Republic
- Coordinates: 50°38′47″N 15°11′44″E
- Country: Czech Republic
- Region: Liberec
- District: Jablonec nad Nisou
- First mentioned: 1422

Area
  - Total: 10.00 km^{2} (3.86 sq mi)
- Elevation: 266 m (873 ft)

Population (2026-01-01)
  - Total: 1,254
  - Density: 125.4/km^{2} (324.8/sq mi)
- Time zone: UTC+1 (CET)
  - Summer (DST): UTC+2 (CEST)
- Postal code: 468 22
- Website: www.mala-skala.cz

Malá Skála (German: Kleinskal) is a municipality and village in Jablonec nad Nisou District in the Liberec Region of the Czech Republic. It has about 1,300 inhabitants.

== Administrative division ==
Malá Skála consists of ten municipal parts (in brackets population according to the 2021 census):

- Malá Skála (109)
- Bobov (18)
- Křížky (48)
- Labe (60)
- Mukařov (178)
- Sněhov (153)
- Vranové 1.díl (422)
- Vranové 2.díl (138)
- Záborčí (44)
- Želeč (15)

== Demographics ==
Historical population
Year	Pop.	±%
1869	1,788	—
1880	1,795	+0.4%
1890	1,853	+3.2%
1900	1,929	+4.1%
1910	1,975	+2.4%
1921	1,781	−9.8%
1930	1,973	+10.8%
1950	1,515	−23.2%
1961	1,392	−8.1%
1970	1,241	−10.8%
1980	1,139	−8.2%
1991	1,027	−9.8%
2001	1,075	+4.7%
2011	1,137	+5.8%
2021	1,185	+4.2%
Source: Censuses

== Notable people ==
- Alois Liška (1895–1977), army officer
- Jan Novotný (1929–2005), glass artist and painter; lived and died here
- Miroslav Šimek (born 1959), slalom canoeist
