= Pustá Polom =

- Municipality
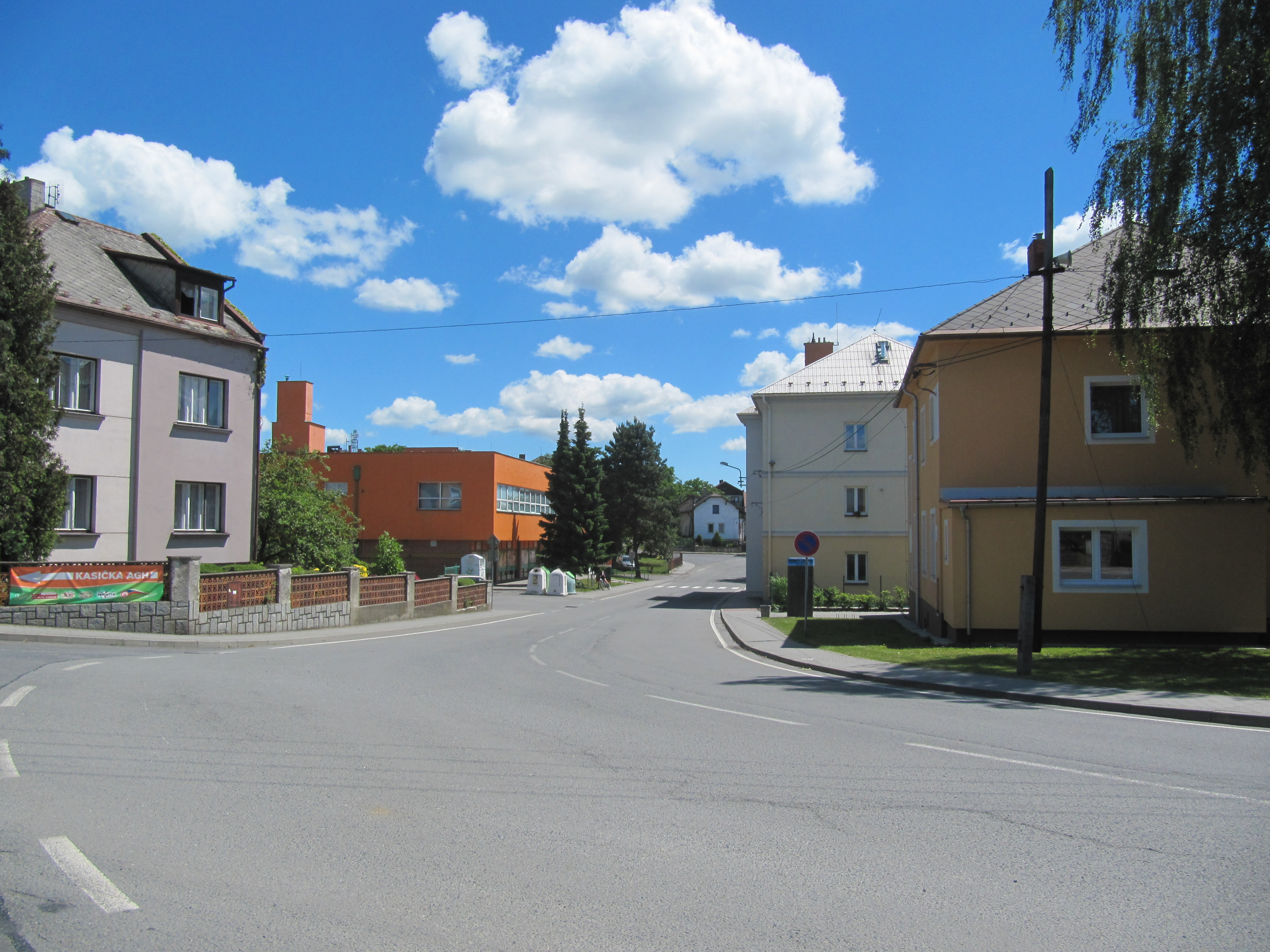
- Centre of Pustá Polom

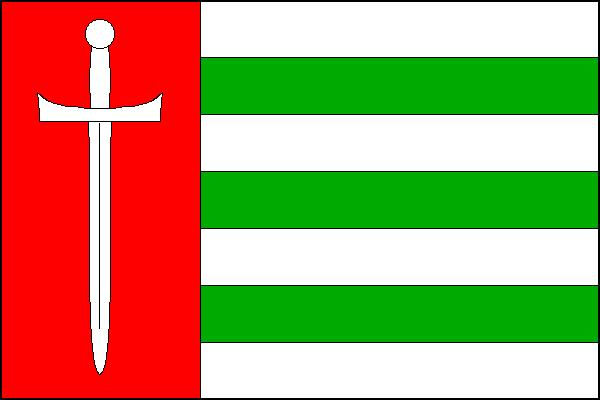
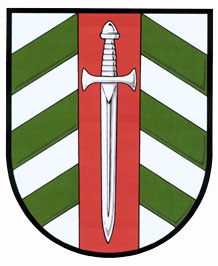
- Flag Coat of arms

- Location in the Czech Republic
- Coordinates: 49°50′57″N 17°59′53″E
- Country: Czech Republic
- Region: Moravian-Silesian
- District: Opava
- First mentioned: 1238

Area
  - Total: 16.58 km^{2} (6.40 sq mi)
- Elevation: 434 m (1,424 ft)

Population (2026-01-01)
  - Total: 1,320
  - Density: 79.6/km^{2} (206/sq mi)
- Time zone: UTC+1 (CET)
  - Summer (DST): UTC+2 (CEST)
- Postal code: 747 69
- Website: www.pustapolom.cz

Pustá Polom (German: Wüstpohlom) is a municipality and village in Opava District in the Moravian-Silesian Region of the Czech Republic. It has about 1,300 inhabitants.

== Etymology ==
The village was initially named just Polom. The word polom denotes a forest of broken trees and the name arose from the establishment of the village on the site of such a forest. The prexif pustá (meaning 'desolate') was added in the 16th century, after the village was resettled.

== Geography ==
Pustá Polom is located about 11 kilometres (7 mi) southeast of Opava and 15 km (9 mi) west of Ostrava. It lies in the Nízký Jeseník range. The highest point is at 470 m (1,540 ft) above sea level. The Sezina Stream originates here and flows to the south.

== History ==
The first written mention of Pustá Polom is from 1238, when King Ottokar I donated the village to the Hradisko Monastery at Olomouc. The monastery owned Pustá Polom until 1440. After that, it was alternately owned by the Lords of Kravaře and Lords of Raduň. In the second half of the 15th century, the village was depopulated and abandoned. It was settled again only in the second half of the 16th century. During the Thirty Years' War, the village was badly damaged and the population decreased. In 1692, Pustá Polom was bought by nobleman Karl Frydrych Kalkreuter and annexed to the Kyjovice estate.

== Demographics ==
Historical population

Year	Pop.	±%
1869	955	—
1880	979	+2.5%
1890	938	−4.2%
1900	923	−1.6%
1910	1,041	+12.8%

Year	Pop.	±%
1921	1,010	−3.0%
1930	1,088	+7.7%
1950	1,142	+5.0%
1961	1,370	+20.0%
1970	1,306	−4.7%

Year	Pop.	±%
1980	1,309	+0.2%
1991	1,304	−0.4%
2001	1,369	+5.0%
2011	1,439	+5.1%
2021	1,332	−7.4%

Source: Censuses

== Transport ==
There are no railways or major roads passing through the municipality.

== Sights ==
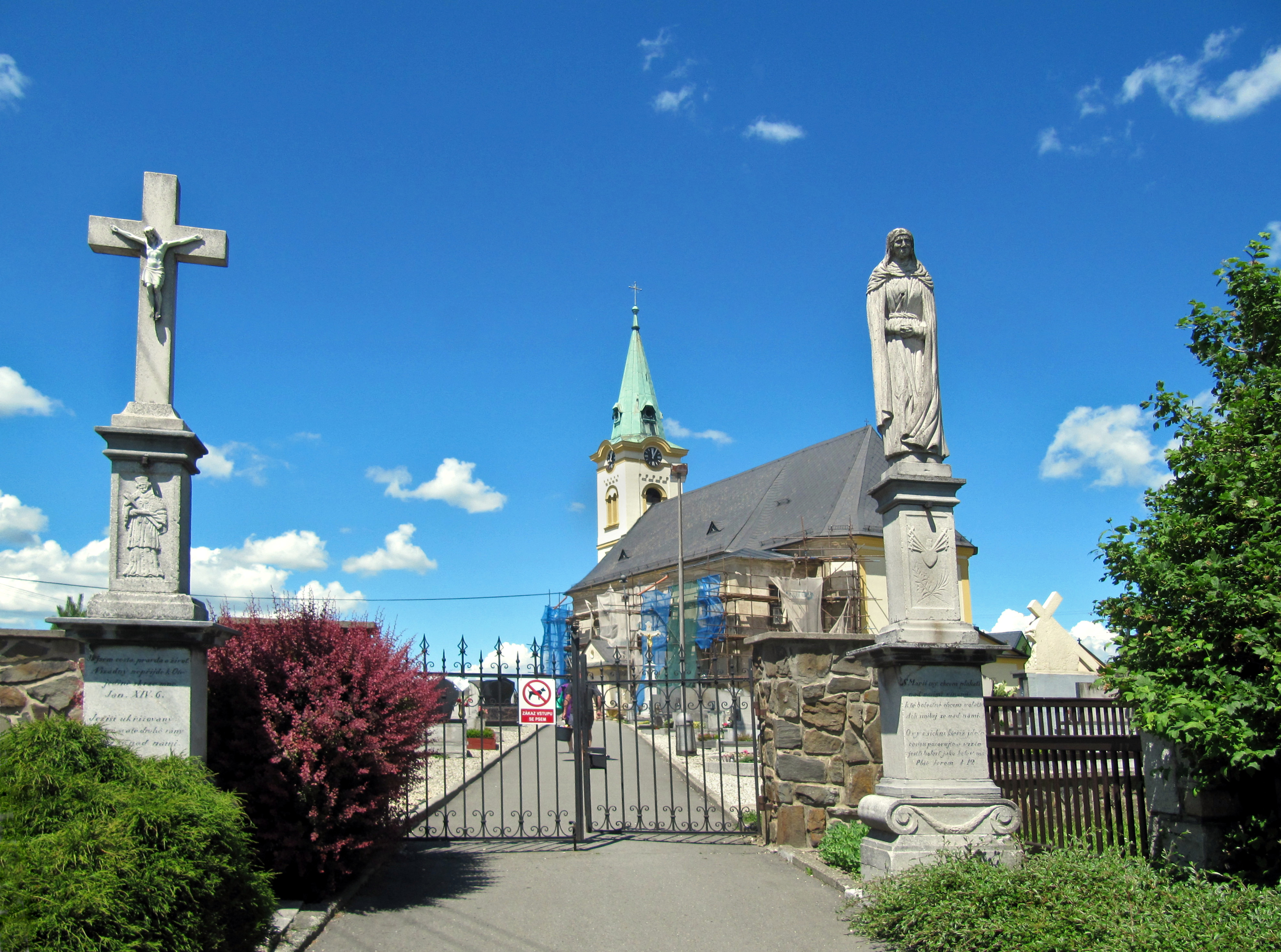
Church of Saint Martin

The only protected cultural monument in the municipality is the Chapel of Saint Anthony of Padua. It is located in the woods north of the village. It is a small chapel, which probably dates from the mid-18th century.

The main landmark of Pustá Polom is the Church of Saint Martin. It was built in 1802–1804. It replaced an old church, which was first documented in 1276.

== Notable people ==
- Jan Novotný (1929–2005), glass artist and painter
