= Coppenaxfort =

Hamlet in France

Coordinates: 50°57′21″N 2°15′47″E

Coppenaxfort (French pronunciation: [kɔpnaksfɔʁ]) is a hamlet in the Nord department in northern France. It is located on the territory of three communes: Brouckerque, Craywick and Bourbourg.

== Geography ==
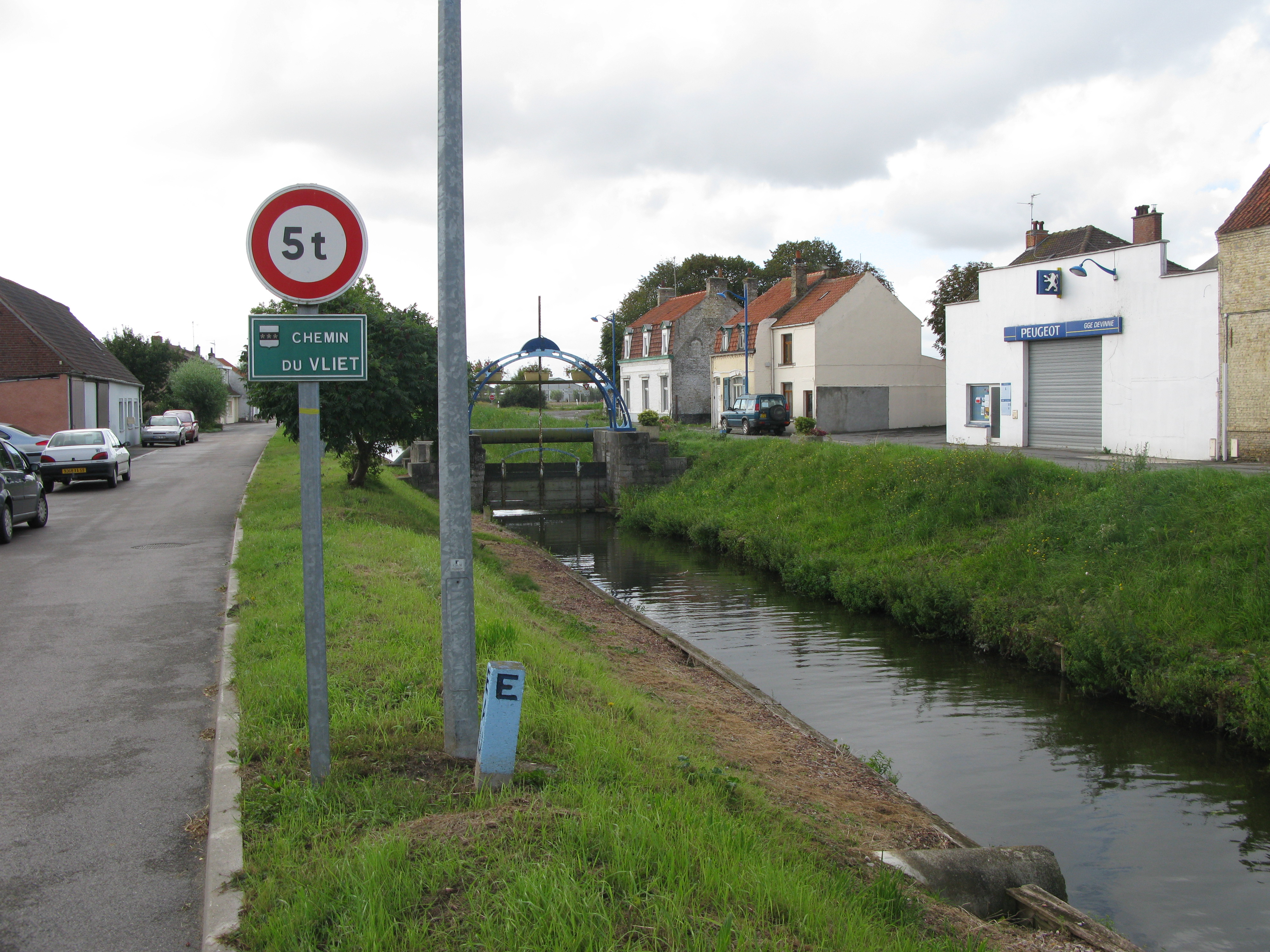
The Vliet river.

Coppenaxfort is located at the junction of Dérivation de la Colme and Canal de Bourbourg canals. The Vliet river flows there too.

== History ==
Around 1644, the Spanish army build a little fort in the place named Coppenax.

== Economy ==
The hamlet had a strong industrial activity between 18th and 20th centuries. Famous industries were Duriez distillery (1857-1986), Chevalier flour milling industry (1911-1980), Dambre brewery (1769-1952).

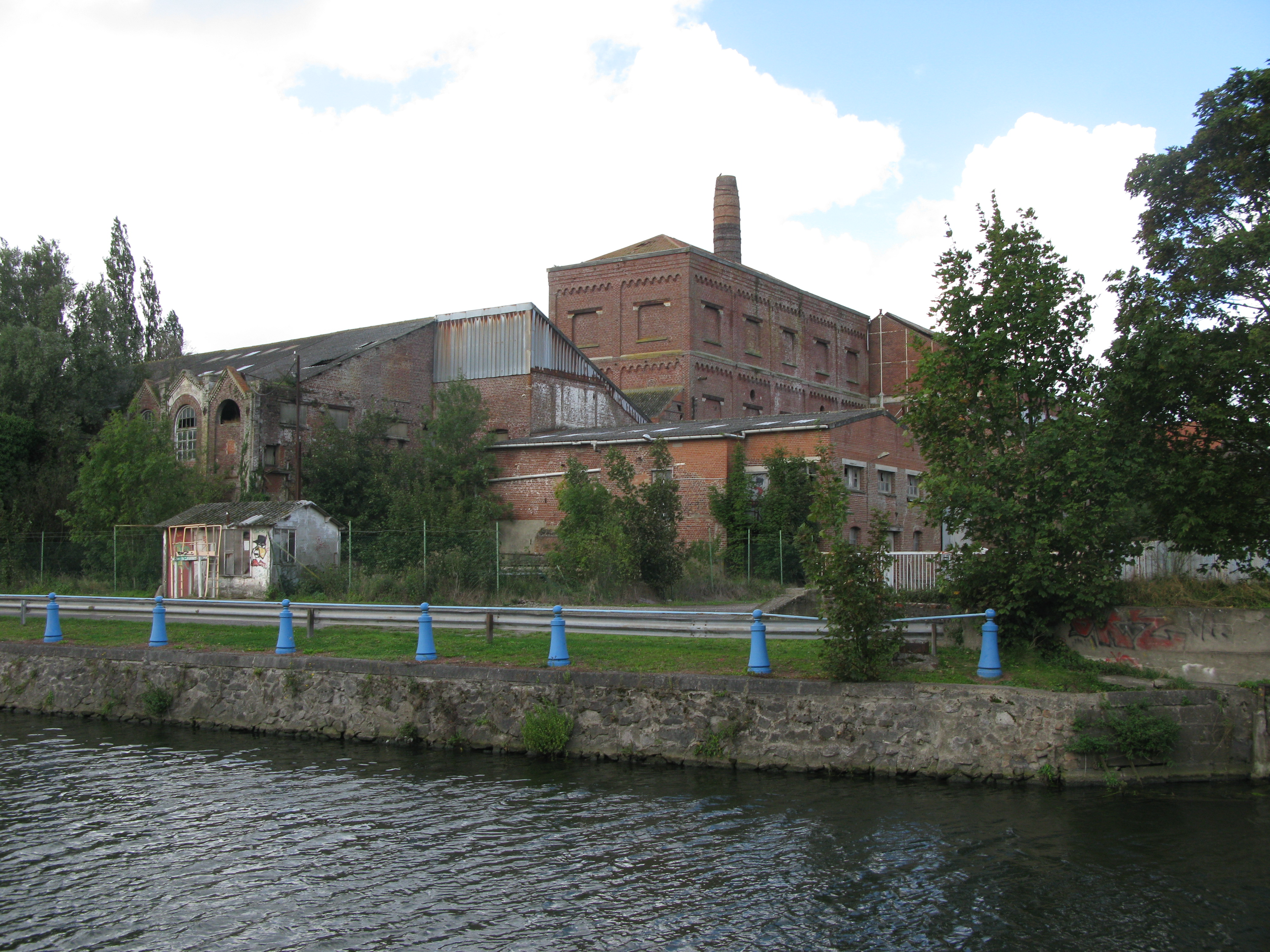
Duriez distillery.

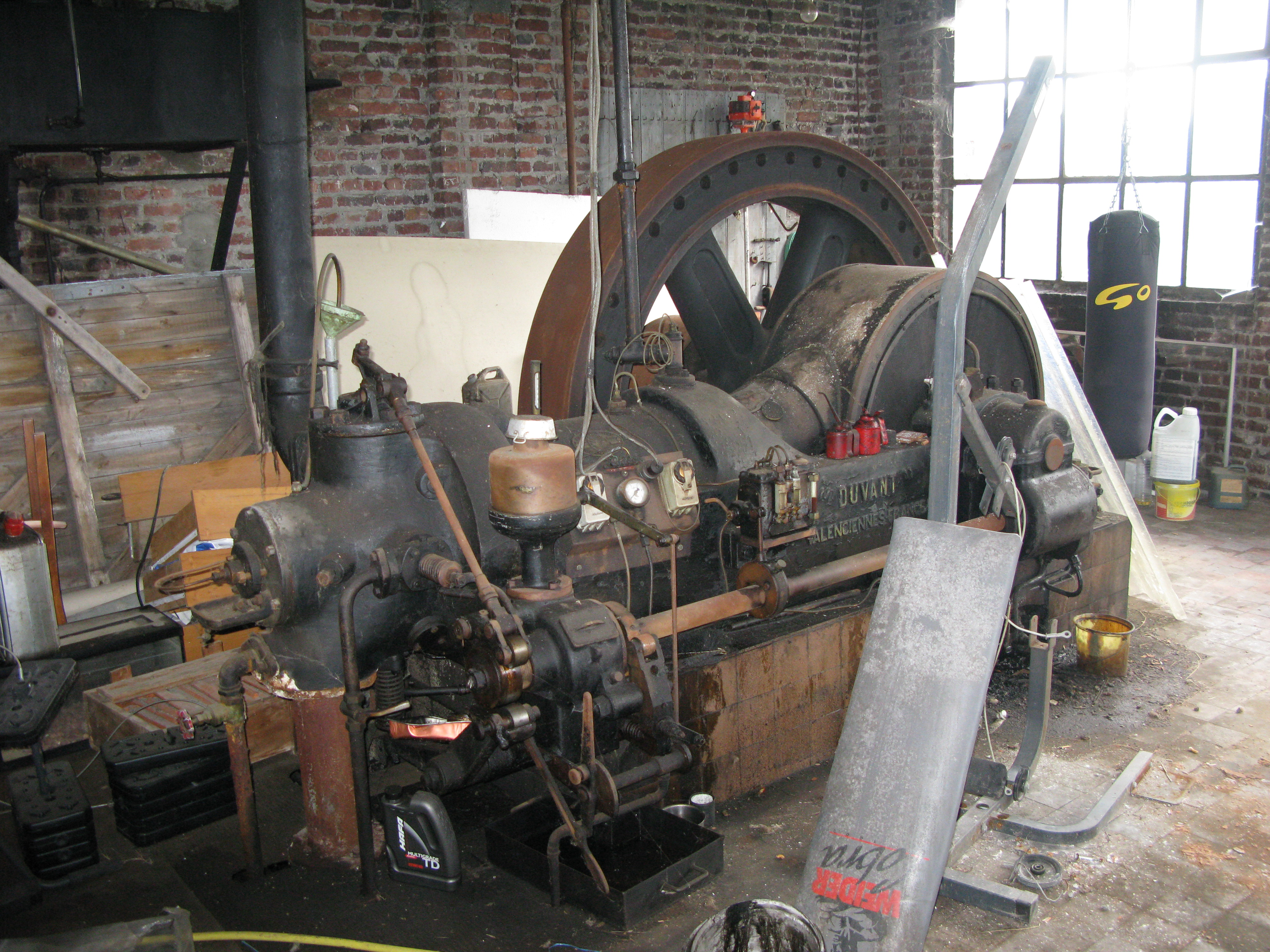
Motor of the Chevalier flour mill.

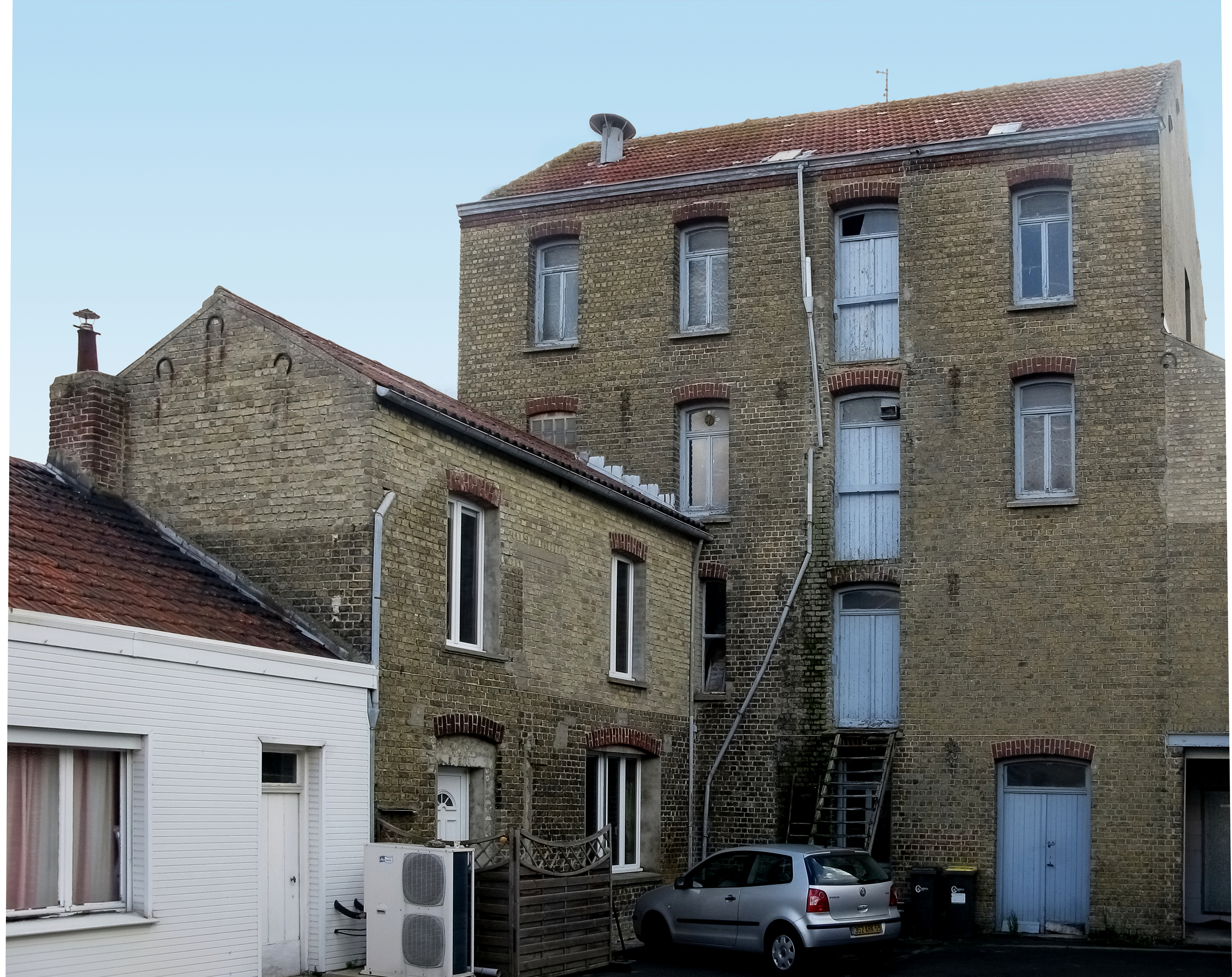
Chevalier flour mill.

== Cityscape ==
The Craywick side has manors which belong to the Duriez family. Coppenaxfort as a big bridge, which was made in 2009 to replace the old one from 1935.

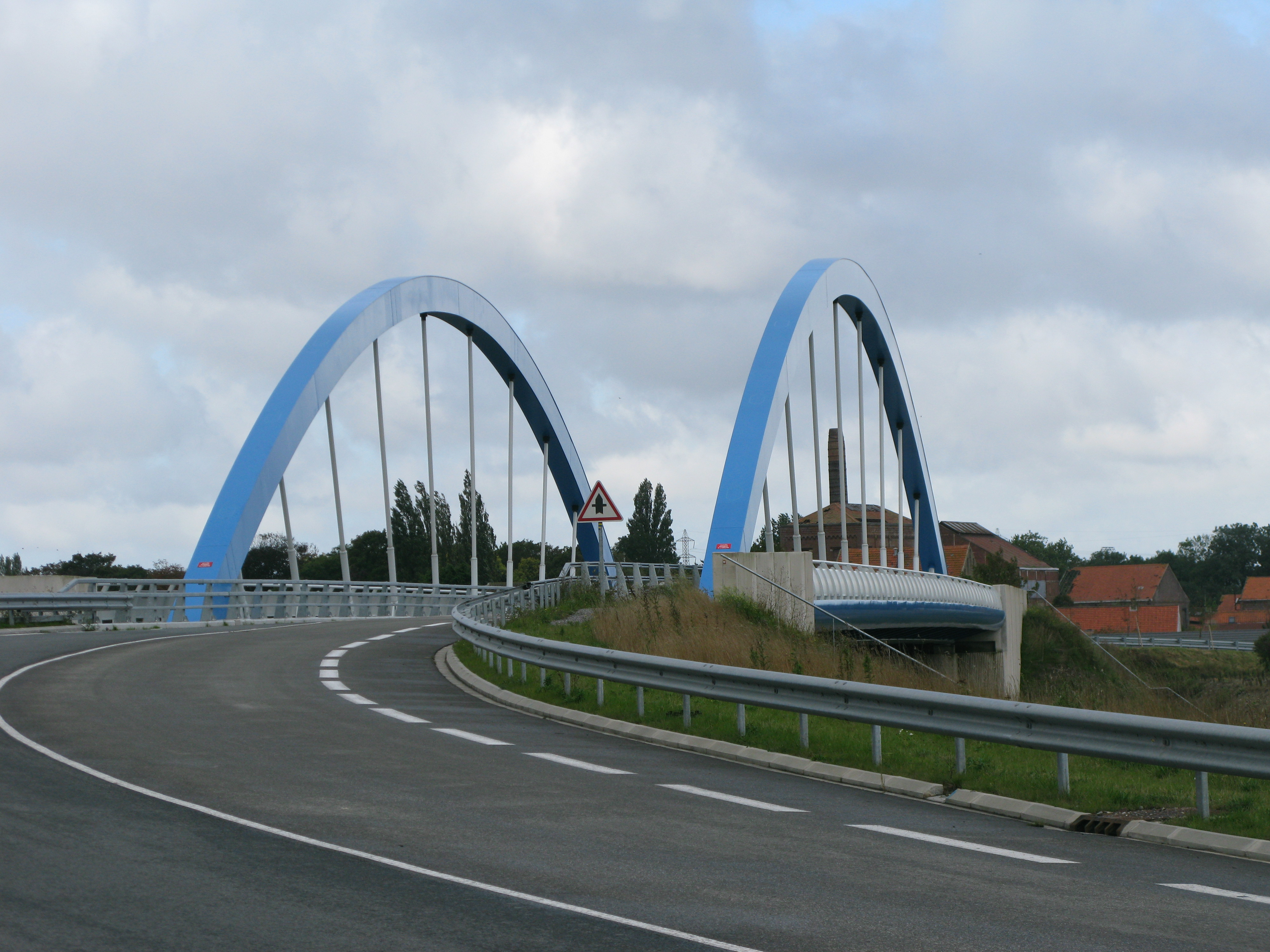
New Coppenaxfort bridge.

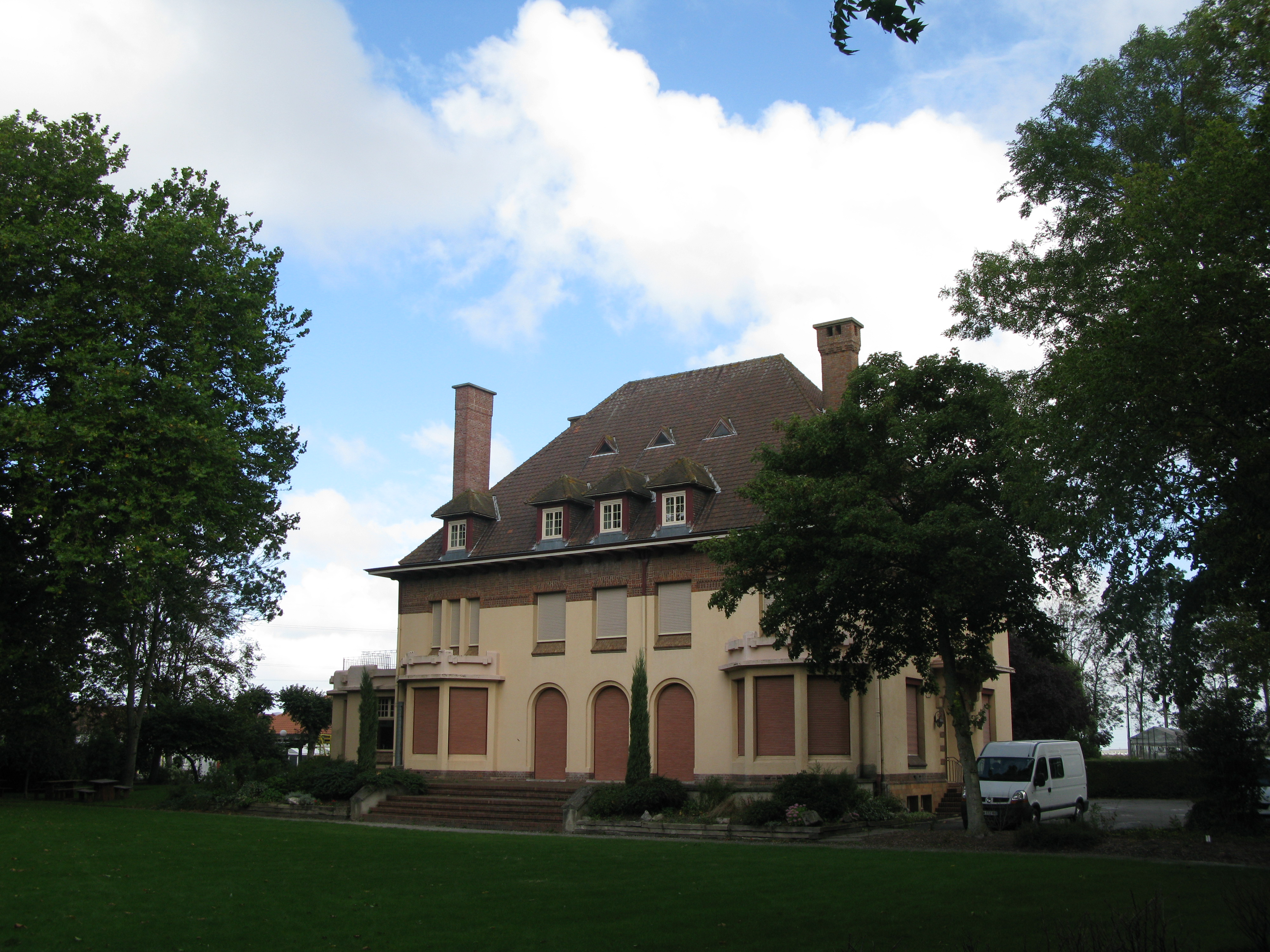
Château jaune.

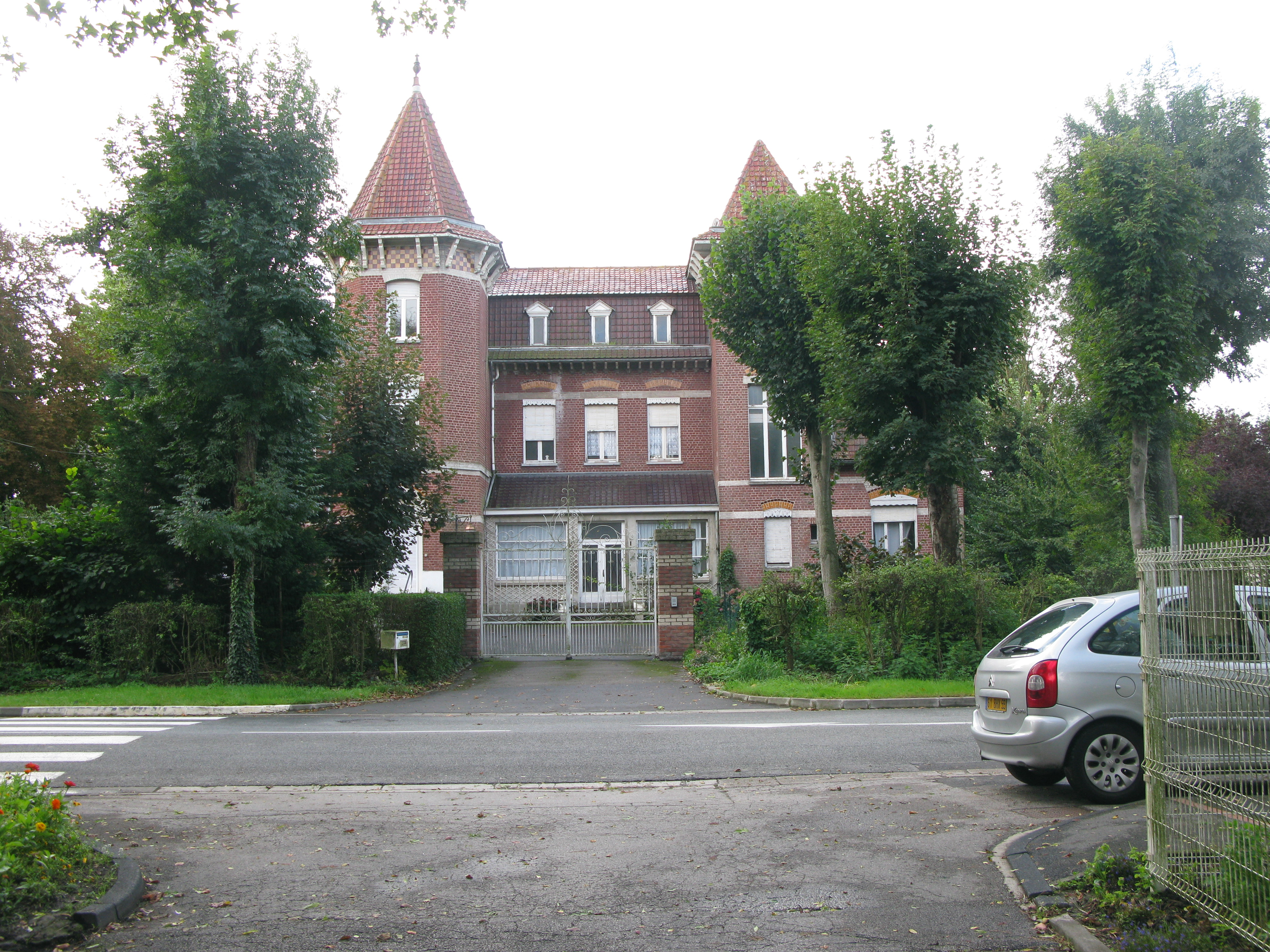
Château rouge.

== See also ==
- Communes of the Nord department
