= Železný Brod =

- Town
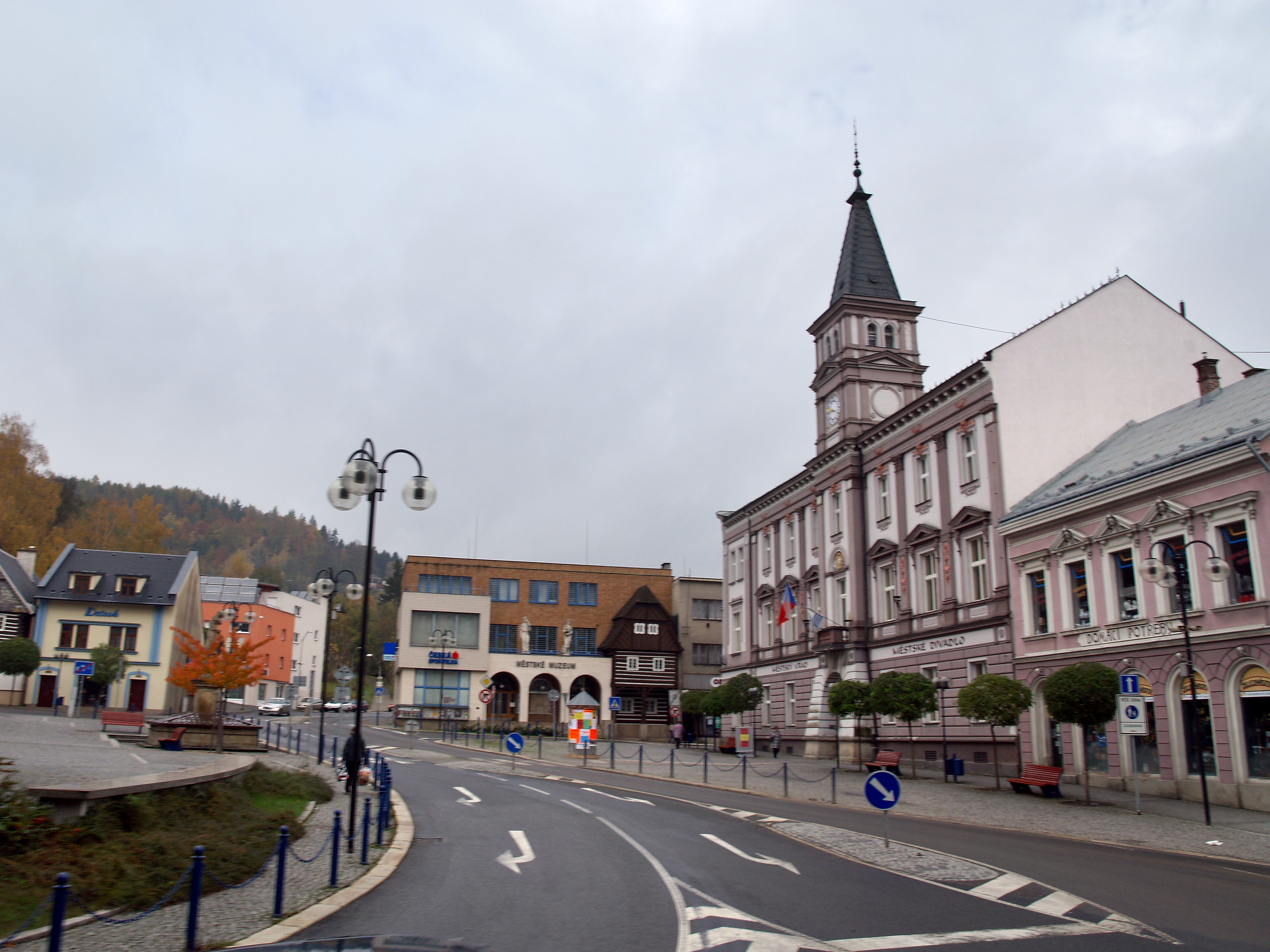
- Town square with the town hall

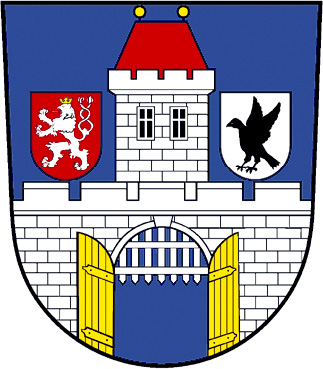
- Flag Coat of arms

- Location in the Czech Republic
- Coordinates: 50°38′30″N 15°15′24″E
- Country: Czech Republic
- Region: Liberec
- District: Jablonec nad Nisou
- First mentioned: 1352

Government
  - Mayor: František Lufinka

Area
  - Total: 22.51 km^{2} (8.69 sq mi)
- Elevation: 305 m (1,001 ft)

Population (2026-01-01)
  - Total: 5,993
  - Density: 266.2/km^{2} (689.6/sq mi)
- Time zone: UTC+1 (CET)
  - Summer (DST): UTC+2 (CEST)
- Postal code: 468 22
- Website: www.zeleznybrod.cz

Železný Brod (Czech pronunciation: [ˈʒɛlɛzniː ˈbrot]; German: Eisenbrod) is a town in Jablonec nad Nisou District in the Liberec Region of the Czech Republic. It has about 6,000 inhabitants. The town is located on the Jizera River in the Giant Mountains Foothills.

Until the 17th century, Železný Brod was a mining town. The Trávníky district of the town has well preserved folk architecture and is protected as a village monument reservation.

== Administrative division ==
Železný Brod consists of 12 municipal parts (in brackets population according to the 2021 census):

- Železný Brod (4,197)
- Bzí (283)
- Chlístov (147)
- Horská Kamenice (113)
- Hrubá Horka (267)
- Jirkov (208)
- Malá Horka (58)
- Pelechov (134)
- Splzov (45)
- Střevelná (42)
- Těpeře (203)
- Veselí (37)

== Etymology ==
The name literally means 'iron ford' in Czech. Originally named just Brod ('ford'), the prefix železný ('iron') was added to its name in the 17th century, refererring to the mining and processing of iron ore in the town and its surroundings.

== Geography ==
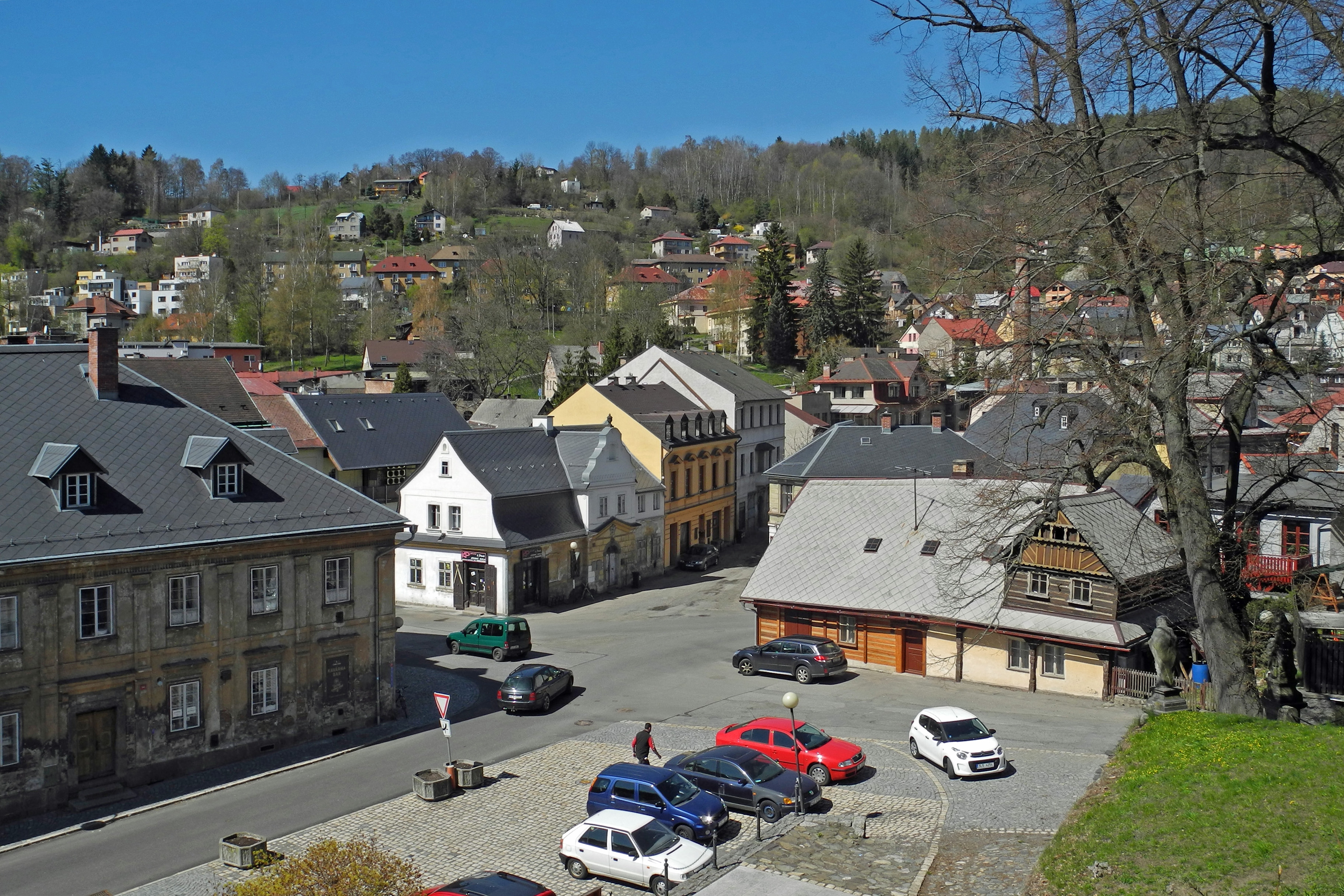
View of the town

Železný Brod is located about 10 kilometres (6 mi) southeast of Jablonec nad Nisou. It lies in the Giant Mountains Foothills. The highest point is at 453 m (1,486 ft) above sea level. The Jizera River flows through the town. The Žernovník Stream flows into the Jizera through the northern part of the town. The Kamenice River flows along the eastern municipal border before it joins the Jizera just outside the limits of Železný Brod.

== History ==
Železný Brod was probably founded in the 11th or 12th century as a settlement named as Brod or Brodek (diminutive of Brod). The village was probably promoted to a town in the 13th century by King Ottokar II. The first written mention of Brod is from 1352. In 1468, the town was burned down, however in 1501, King Vladislaus II restored the town's rights and gave the town its coat of arms. Iron ore had been mined in the area around the city since the 14th century, but mining ceased during the Thirty Years' War.

For almost 150 years, the Železný Brod estate was owned by the Waldstein family. In 1628, Albrecht von Wallenstein sold it to the Desfours family, who owned it until the establishment of independent municipalities in 1848. In the late 19th and early 20th centuries, the glassmaking industry boomed with the development of glass production and grinding mills. In 1920, the first Czech professional glassmaking school was opened.

== Demographics ==
Historical population

Year	Pop.	±%
1869	5,430	—
1880	6,107	+12.5%
1890	6,339	+3.8%
1900	6,185	−2.4%
1910	6,579	+6.4%

Year	Pop.	±%
1921	6,152	−6.5%
1930	6,788	+10.3%
1950	5,170	−23.8%
1961	5,441	+5.2%
1970	5,663	+4.1%

Year	Pop.	±%
1980	7,099	+25.4%
1991	6,826	−3.8%
2001	6,544	−4.1%
2011	6,276	−4.1%
2021	5,734	−8.6%

Source: Censuses

== Economy ==
Železný Brod is located in a region with a tradition of glass and costume jewelry production. The largest industrial company based in the town is Detesk, a producer of decorative and technical glass with more than 100 employees.

== Transport ==
Železný Brod is located on the railway line Pardubice–Liberec.

== Sights ==
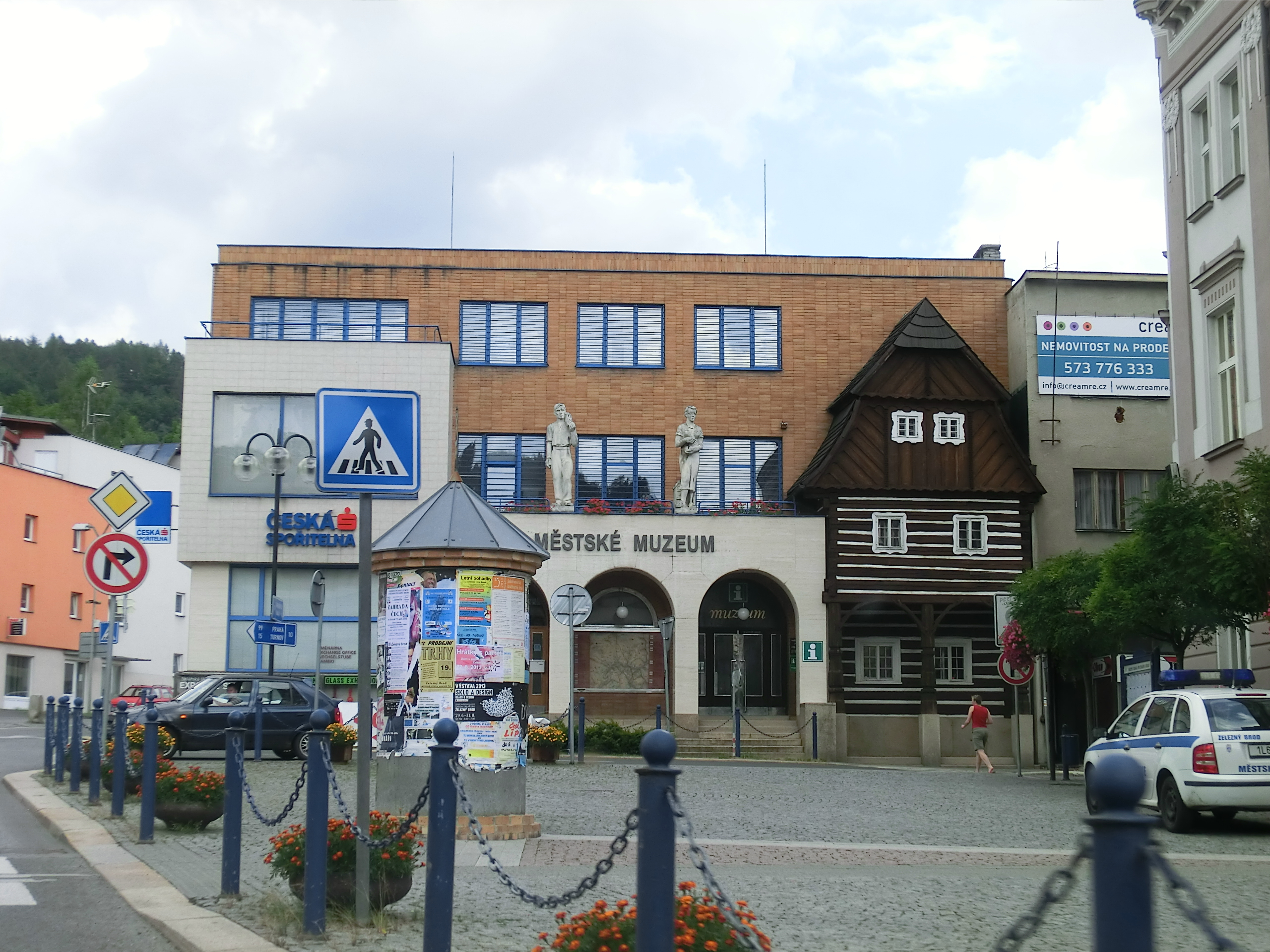
Klemencovsko house with the Town Museum

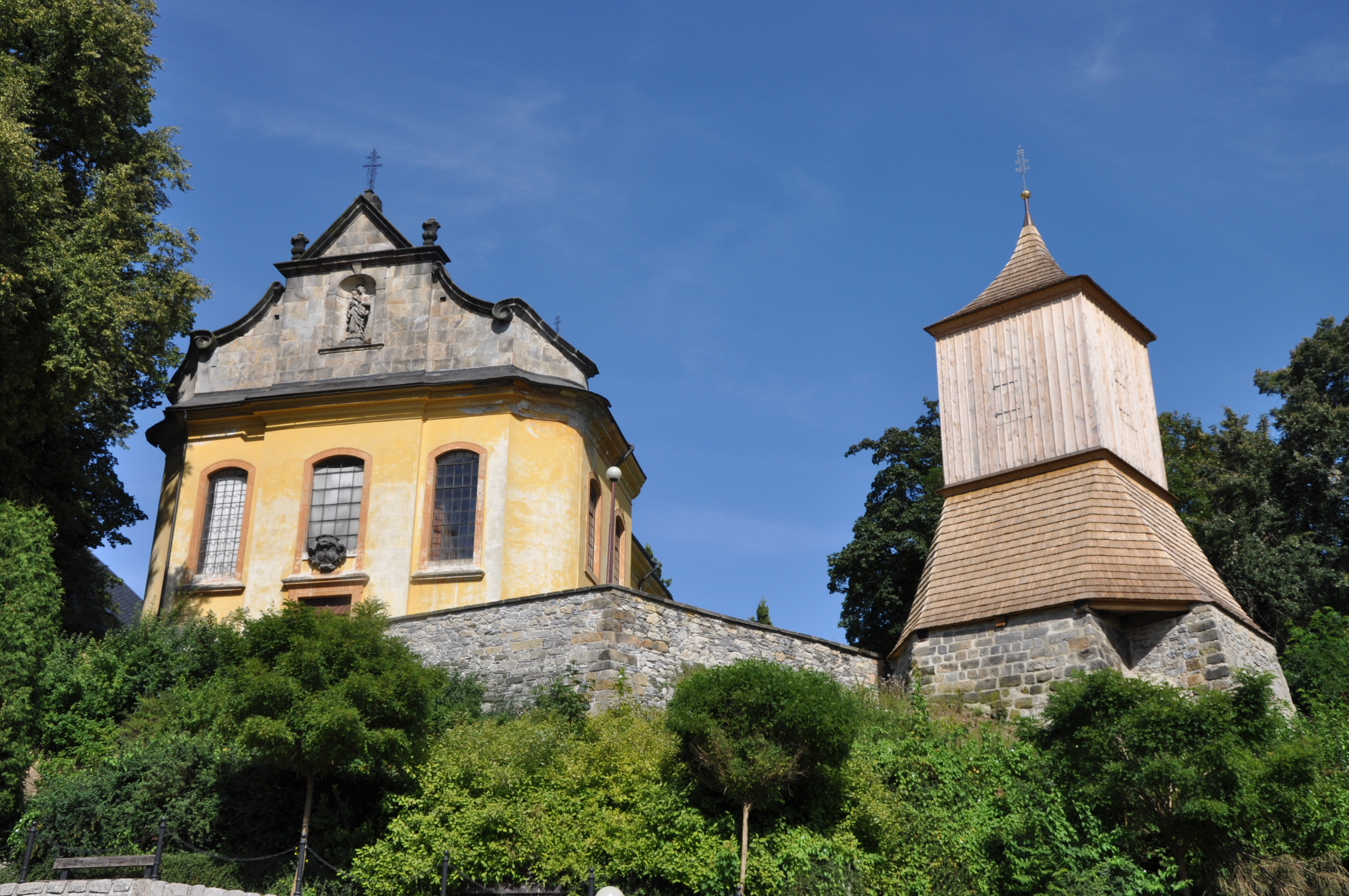
Church of Saint James the Great

The Neo-Renaissance town hall was built in 1890. The Town Theatre and the Town Art Gallery of Vlastimil Rada are both located within the town hall building. The town's coat-of-arms is displayed on the ground floor.

A timbered house called Běliště is the location of the ethnographic exposition of the Town Museum, focusing on the history of Železný Brod and its close surroundings.

Klemencovsko is a former burgher timbered house from 1792 located on the town square. Since 1936, the house served as a part of the savings bank building. Today the house serves as a part of the town museum and holds an exposition of the Železný Brod glass-making, and the gallery of Stanislav Libenský and Jaroslava Brychtová.

The Trávníky district is situated at the confluence of the Jizera and Žernovka. It is remarkable for a set of folk architecture monuments, formed by old Neoclassical and timbered houses from the 18th and 19th centuries. Among the most valuable houses are the Empire houses called Grosovsko and Knopovsko. The Church of Saint James the Great in Trávníky was built at the end of the 17th century, the wooden belfry next to the church dates from 1761. There is also the Mini-museum of glass nativity scenes.

The Church of the Holy Trinity in Bzí is a Baroque rural church. It was built in 1692–1697 and replaced an older wooden building.

== Notable people ==
- Marie Fabianová (1872–1943), mathematician and teacher
- Pravoslav Rada (1923–2011), artist
- Jaroslava Brychtová (1924–2020), contemporary artist

== Twin towns – sister cities ==
Železný Brod is twinned with:

- Lauscha, Germany
- Olszyna, Poland
