= Jiřina Žertová =

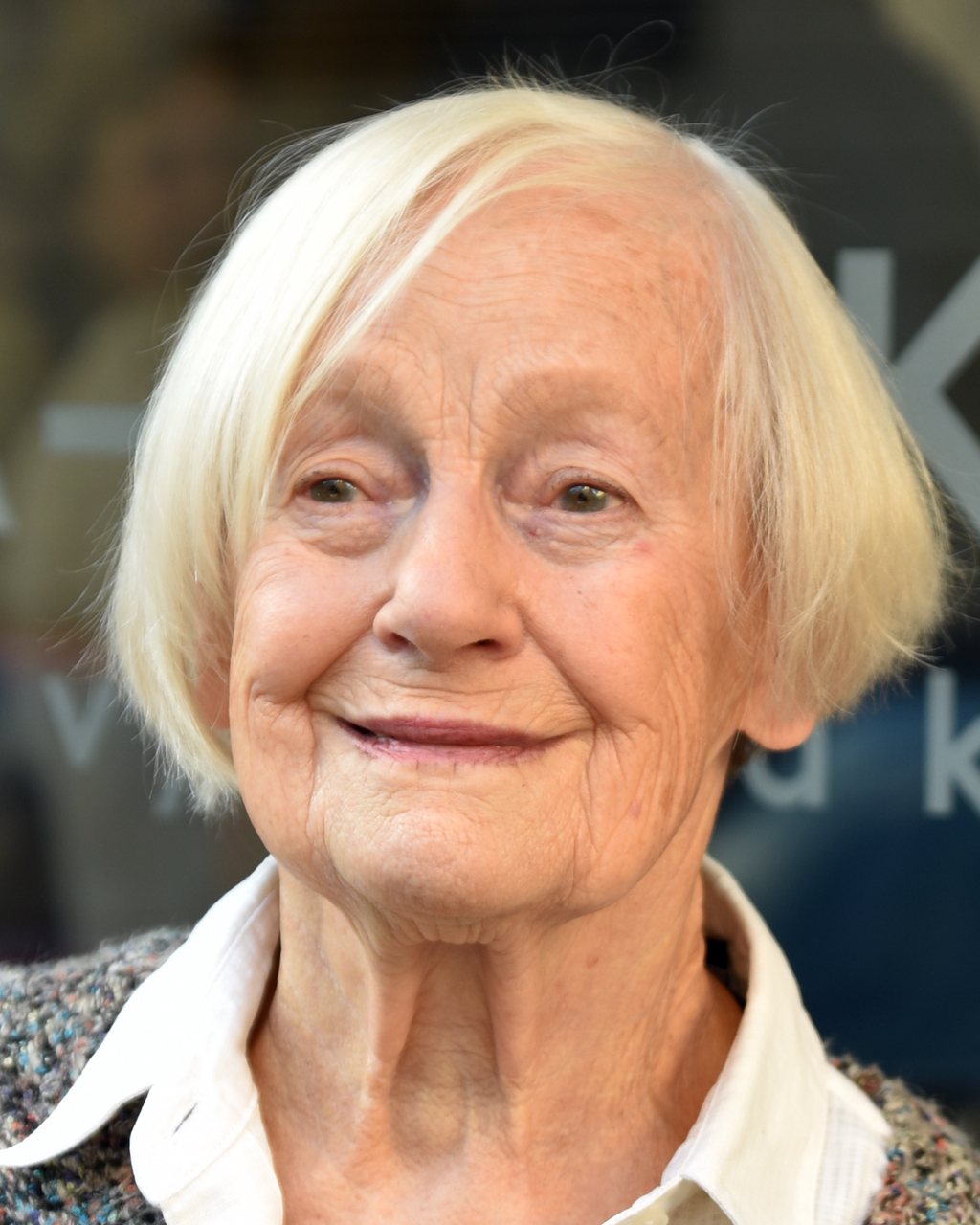
- Žertová in 2022
- Born: Jiřina Rejholcová; 13 August 1932 (age 94); Prague, Czechoslovakia
- Education: Academy of Arts, Architecture and Design in Prague
- Known for: Painting; sculpting; glass designing
- Spouse: Bedřich Žert
- Children: 2
- Awards: Silver Medal, XI. Trienale di Milano, 1957

Jiřina Žertová (née Rejholcová; born 13 August 1932) is a Czech sculptor, painter, glass and art-industrial artist.

== Early life and education ==
Jiřina Žertová comes from the family of Josef Rejholec, an official of the Supreme State Audit Office in Prague. From 1947 to 1950 she studied at the State Graphic Arts School under Prof. Zdeněk Balaš. In 1949, the school was renamed Higher School of Art Industry, where she studied in the studio of Petr Dillinger. Her classmate and friend was Zdena Strobachová, and her older colleagues were Adriena Šimotová or Jiří John.

== Career ==
Already after her third year of graphic design school, she passed the exam for the Academy of Arts, Architecture and Design in Prague, where she was admitted in 1950, shortly after the February Communist coup and at a time of severe political persecution. Despite this, Professor Josef Kaplický managed to maintain a liberal and creative atmosphere in the studio. A group of students gathered here (René Roubíček, Stanislav Libenský, Václav Cigler, Vladimír Kopecký, Vratislav Šotola, Stanislav Oliva, Rudolf Volráb, etc.), who were interested in modern painting and graphics and could apply their ideas in work with etched and painted glass. At that time, magazines such as Cahiers d'Art were still available in the Museum of Decorative Arts library, where it was possible to get acquainted with modern French art. Jiřina Žertová finished her studies in 1955 with a design for a monumental stained glass panel with a horse motif. She managed to obtain a scholarship from the Union of Czechoslovak Artists and the following year she worked at the Glass Centre on designs for utility glass intended for industrial production.

Since 1956 she has worked as an independent artist and has been working freelance. She graduated from Josef Kaplický's studio and her glass designs were regularly exhibited at Czech glass shows. She has been exhibiting independently since 1973 (Vienna). In 1989 she had a solo exhibition at the Heller Gallery, New York and Nakama Gallery, Tokyo, in 1992 in Miller Gallery, New York.

She collaborated externally with Bohemia Glassworks in Poděbrady and designed blown and engraved glass for Škrdlovice Glassworks. The glassworks was nationalised and fell under the Directorate of Arts and Crafts, but the original owners worked here as master glassmakers from the 1950s onwards and also realised very demanding designs by glass artists. The possibilities of author's work in Škrdlovice changed radically after 1967, when František Vízner and Dana Vachtová came to the management as designers. Žertová and Vachtová also began to use the sampling hours offered to artists by Crystalex in Nový Bor. Jiřina Žertová's glass objects were realized by glass masters František Danielka, Josef Rozínek (Nový Bor glassworks) or Josef Kučera (Chřibská glassworks).

Since 2007 she has been a member of Mánes Union of Fine Arts.

=== Awards ===
- 1957 XI. Trienale di Milano, Silver Medal
- 2004 International Exhibition of Glass Kanaza

== Personal life ==
She married the geologist Bedřich Žert, with whom she has a daughter Pavlína (* 1956) and a son Jan (* 1959).

== Work ==
Jiřina Žertová is one of the glass artists who, in the context of Czech studio glass art, are most prominent in the field of painted glass.

During her studies, she focused mainly on painting and for the first three years on cut glass during her internship at the Moser glassworks in Karlovy Vary. After graduating, she drew designs for Bohemia Glassworks in Poděbrady, which worked with lead cut glass. She won her first international award for a set of cut glass in 1957. In the 1950s, glass allowed much more creative freedom than other disciplines where socialist realism dominated.

Her creative career in working with glass developed in the 1960s, when she had the opportunity to realize designs for cast glass in the Škrdlovice glassworks. Already the first works by Jiřina Žertová were carried in the spirit of unconventional solutions and retained the distinctive qualities of abstract artistic expression. She uses colour as a meaning forming element, but her objects, when inspired by nature, are based primarily on the possibilities and specifics of the glass itself. She also made her first larger objects of blown glass here, but she discovered new creative possibilities only after moving to the Borské sklo (later Crystalex) glassworks, where she was invited by František Danielka.

At the beginning of the author's truly original glass work in the second half of the 1970s was blown glass. The rotational principle of shaping the glass while blowing it into a wooden mould influenced her work towards strictly geometric shapes, which she combined to emphasise the mutual tension and dynamics of the inner space. Initially, the driving force behind her creativity was the sheer thrill of forming a dimensional bubble, which resulted in a fascinating object. Interventions in it were limited to bending or simply denting the smoothly stretched shape. She was interested in the artistic design of interior space and designed technically demanding blown objects with embedded elements. However, Jiřina Žertová soon abandoned the sleekness of the form and imprinted various objects on glass. She also began to use blowing into increasingly complex wooden and plaster moulds, which her husband Bedřich Žert helped her to make. Contrary to the previous workshop practice, she also left the so-called "kicks" - the edges of the glass mass protruding outside the mould - as part of the objects. These gave the elementally expanding mass a new dramatic expression in the modelling of shapes and in the structures of the surfaces. She combined the harmony of the curves of the blown shapes with the treatment of their walls with a decoration of bubbles along with bold "painterly strokes" of strands of coloured glass.

Jiřina Žertová could not completely control the colour of her objects when working in the glassworks and worked partly with the element of randomness. Therefore, in the 1980s, the artist emphasised the starkness of the shaping by expressive gestural painting interventions, the form of which eventually settled on a cast linear structure, enveloping the glass form in a colourful tangle and affecting the base as well. The transformation of stimuli from concrete reality was not a fundamentally determining moment in their creation. They arose freely, in the preoccupation with the creative thinking itself about the modelling of masses of glass form with light, about the interaction of sculptural forms with colour accents as an element of a different artistic language. The culmination and the turning point in this series was the object Don't Ask Where We're Going from 1990.

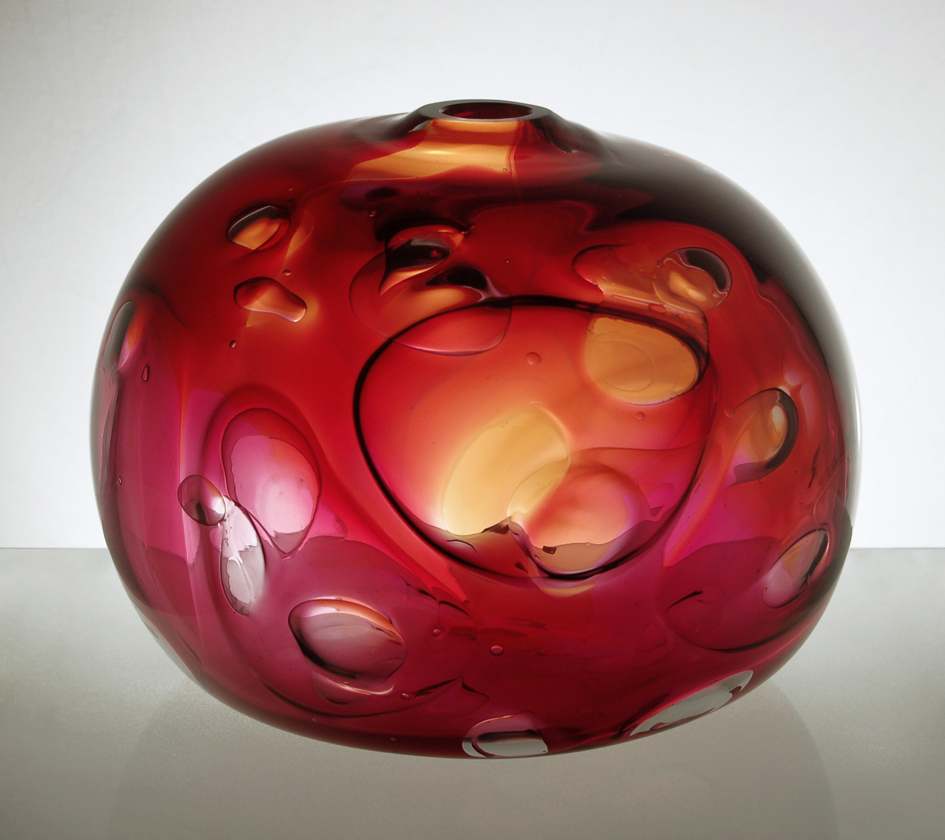
Vase 3, Škrdlovice, 1966

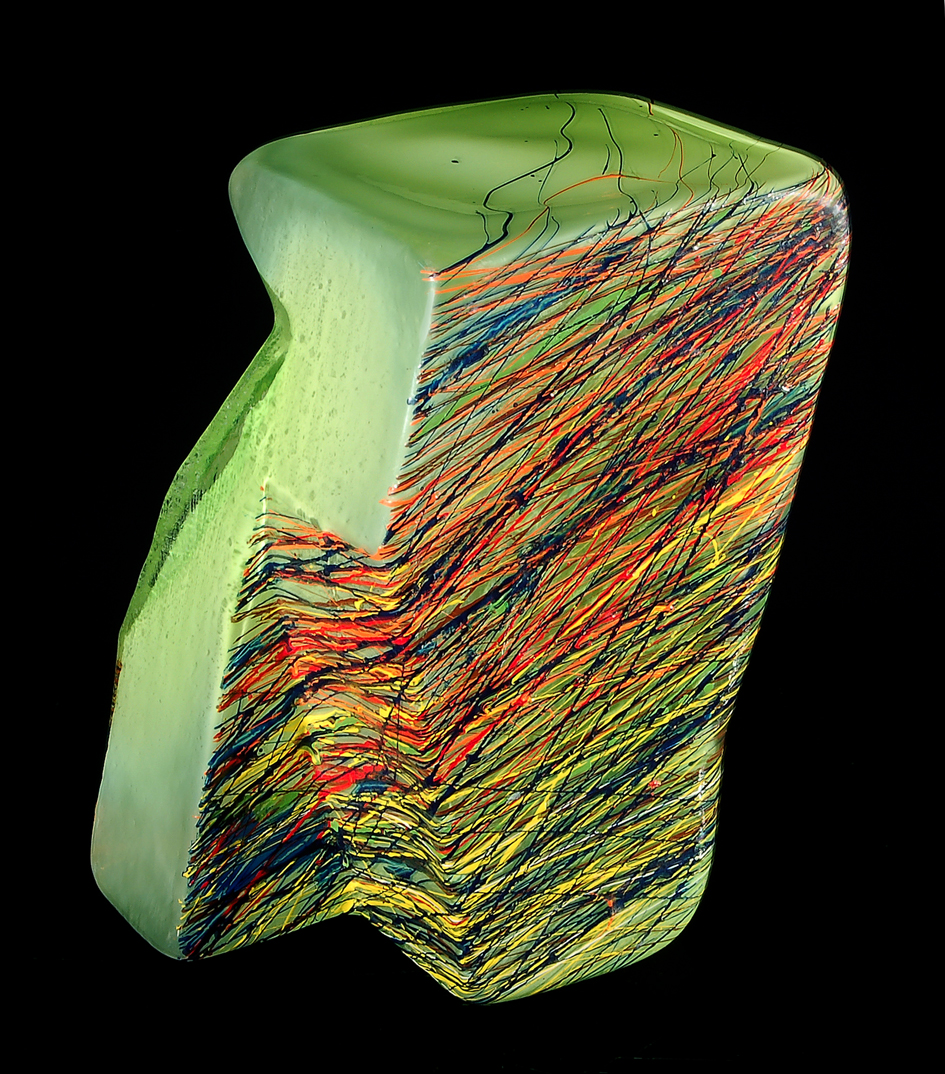
Stone, 1990

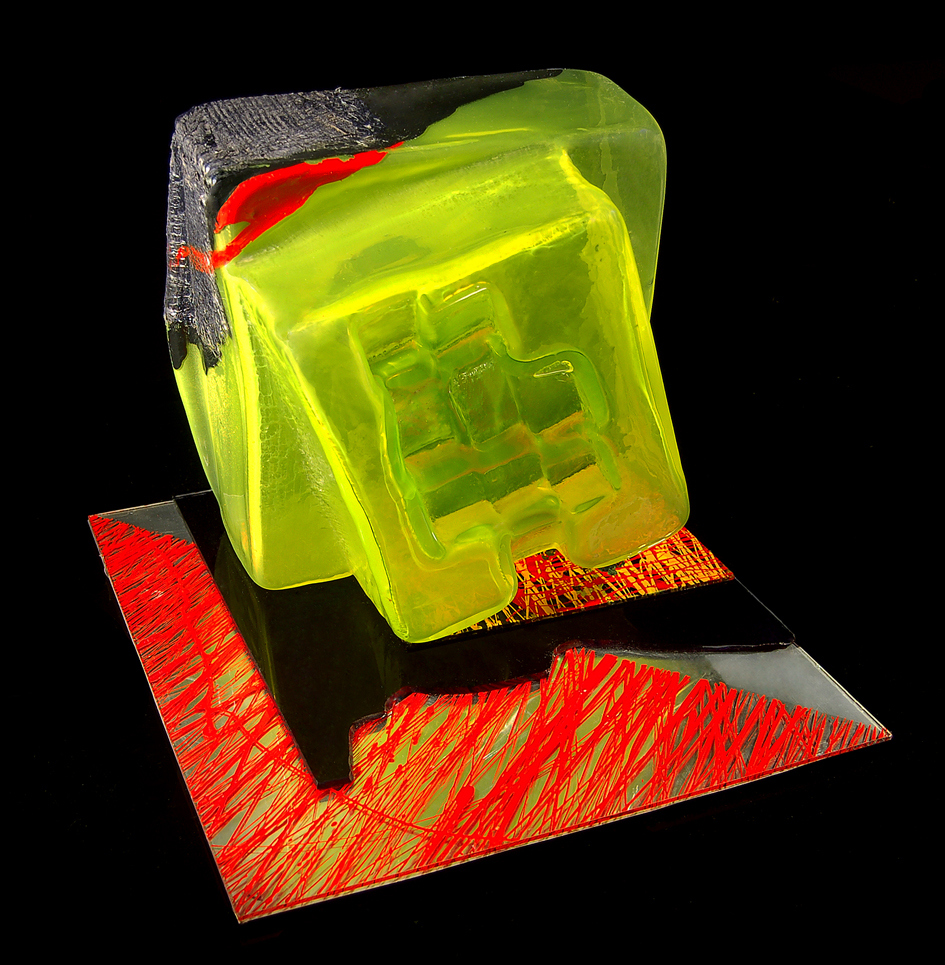
Red grass, 1994

In the early 1990s, Jiřina Žertová felt that she had exhausted her creative possibilities in blown objects. The cooperation with the glassworks also became complicated during privatisation and with the arrival of new owners. She found absolute freedom of creativity and independence in the application of the principle of layering painted flat glass. The form of the artist's works is less dramatic in external form. The seemingly immaterial prisms of layered panels do not expand into space, they enclose themselves. The glass has become a building element, a carrier of the painted colour structure, a mediator of the visual variability of the whole object. In its enclosed interior space, a volatile game is unfolding with colour and light variability, with the illusion of the tangible, with spatial magic, with the distortion of the logic of the object's construction by the reflections of mirrors. Although it is again possible to see similarities with reality in the works, the connection is generally symbolic. The often large-scale works can thus be approached primarily as a generous offer of an experience of an impressive play with multiplicity, with colour and structure, with something seen and yet elusive. As the horizon shifts, illusory shapes and bodies appear and disappear again, lending the compositions the character of a mobile object. This layering of flat glass in conjunction with gestural abstract painting has shifted the painting from defined spatial shapes to the third dimension and distinguishes Jiřina Žertová's works within the international context.

In the decade after 2011, Jiřina Žertová began to work with compositions oriented towards height, where she managed to dynamise and undulate some objects by deviating them from the axis. Objects composed of plate glass offer a range of visual effects - shapes can blend into each other, as well as shift in and out of view, and coloured painted surfaces seen in the foreground are added to those reflected by mirrors. In this way, the artist has created a large number of charismatic works - complex spatial objects composed of flat glass. The layers feature a rich swirl of colour structures, but also monochrome black or red lines combined with flat areas (Babylon, 2012). In the objects created after 2013, she has also resolved the coherence of vertically arranged glasses and created several objects in which austere geometric shapes are applied.

Jiřina Žertová has exhibited her studio glass work internationally and her works are held in major collections in the Czech Republic and abroad.

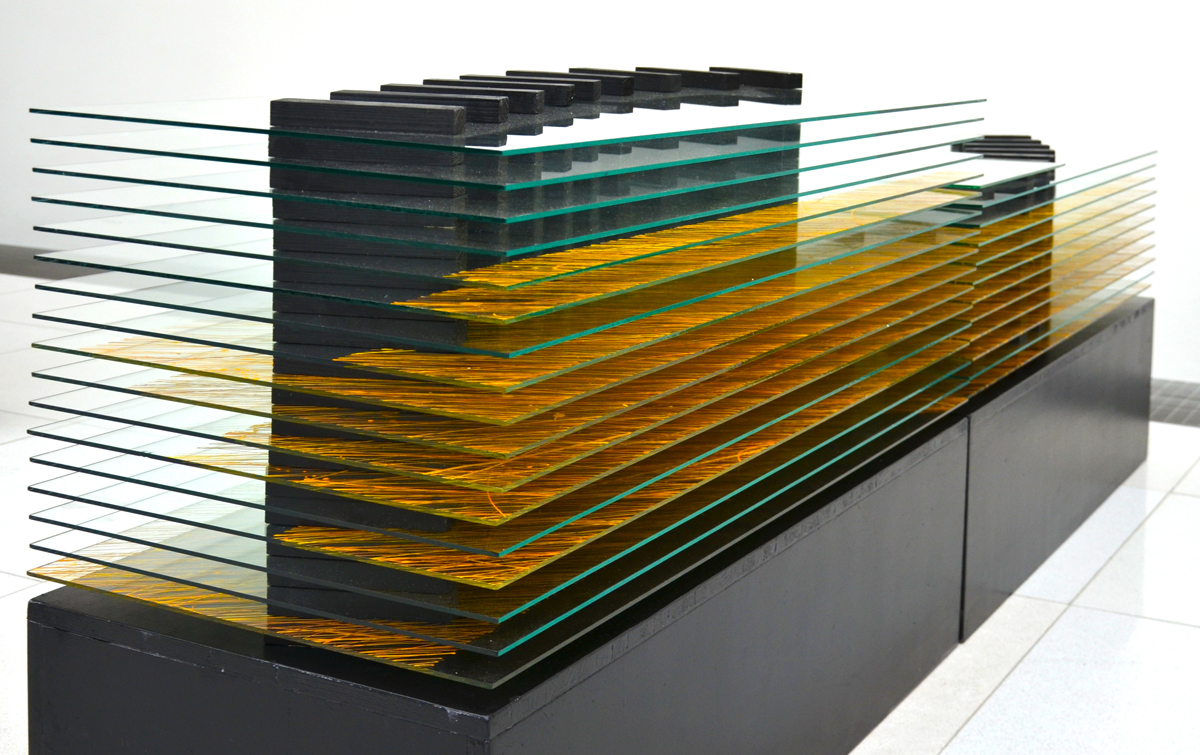
Viaduct, 1999

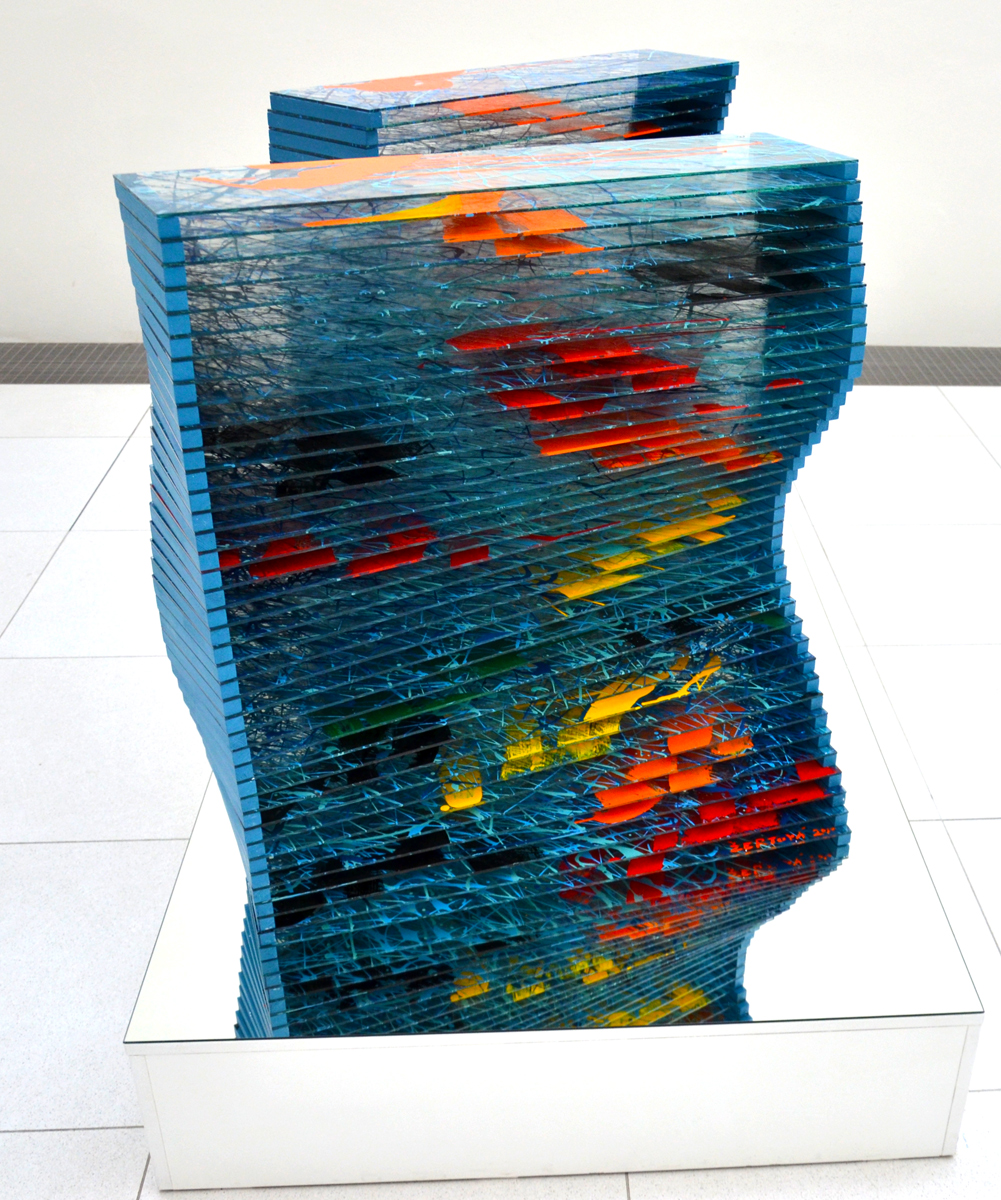
Gone with the Wind I, II, 2001

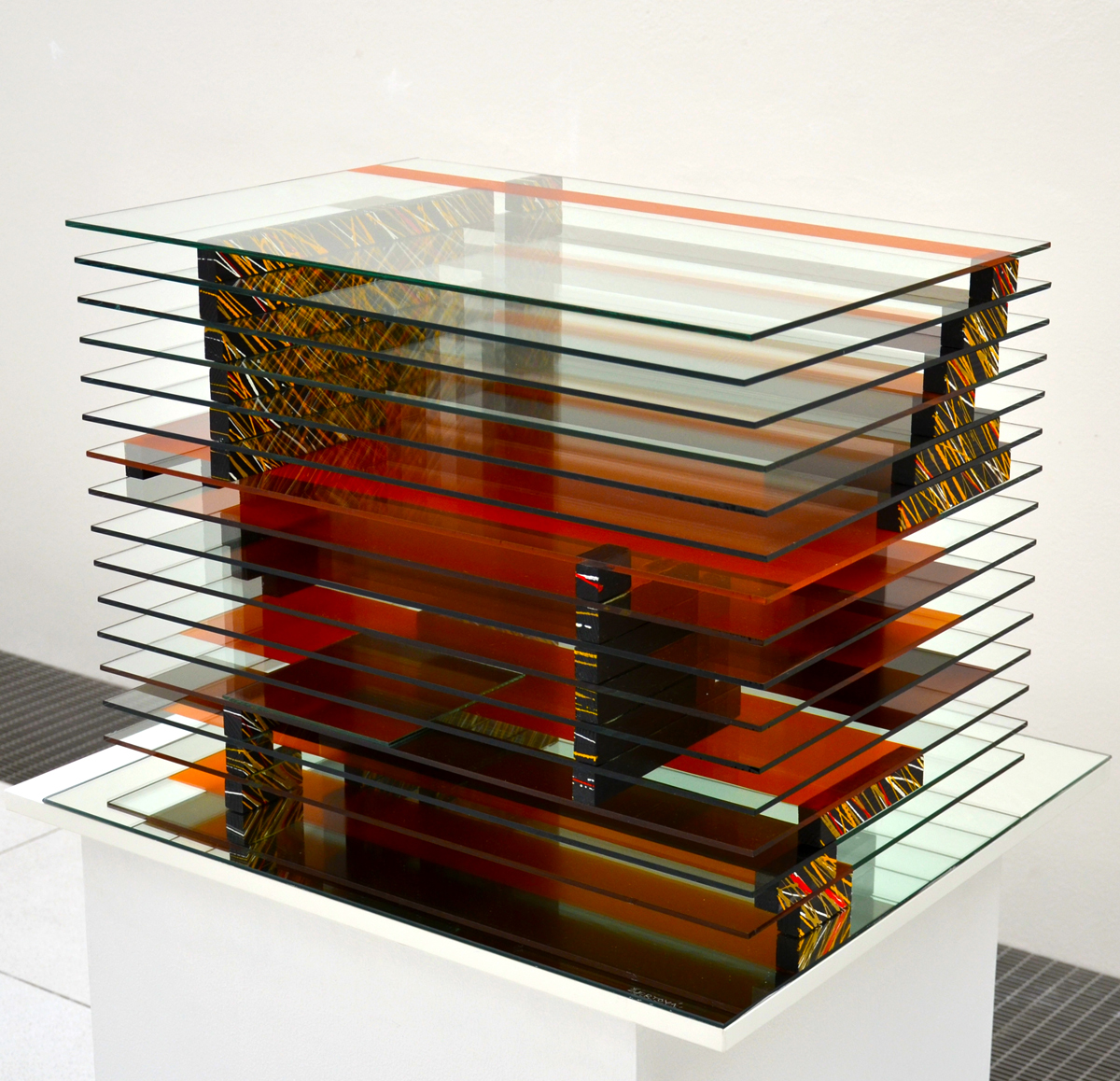
Darkness gate, 2001

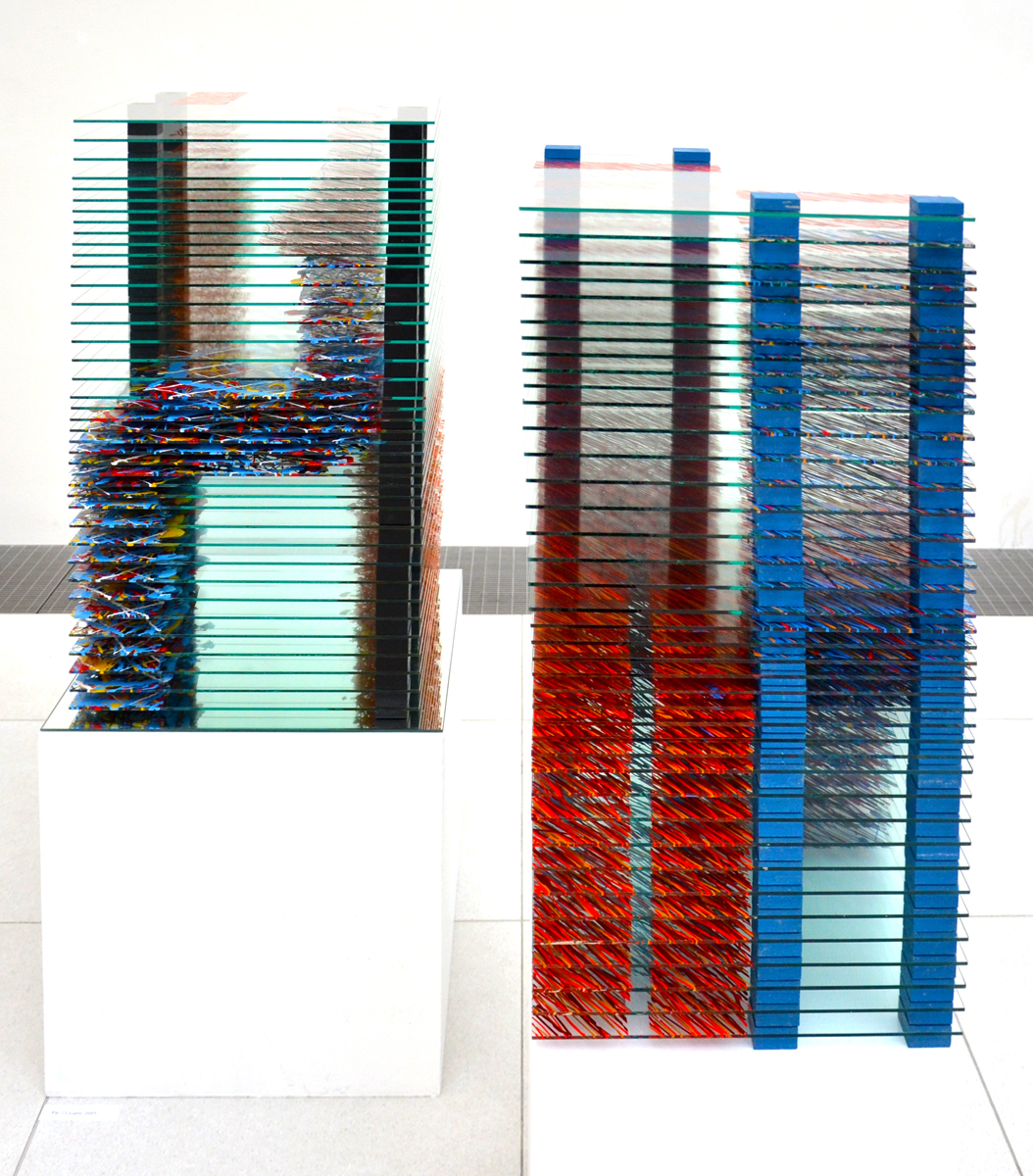
Lovers, 2004

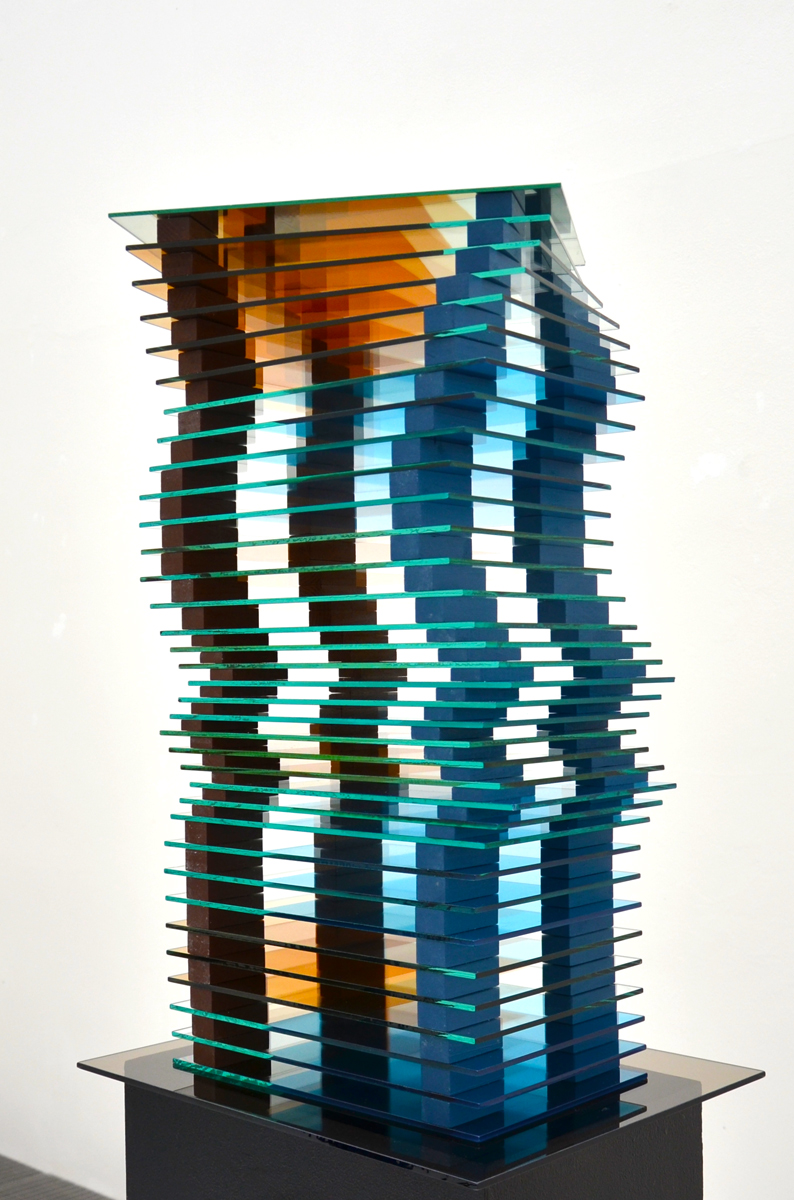
Smokers, 2005

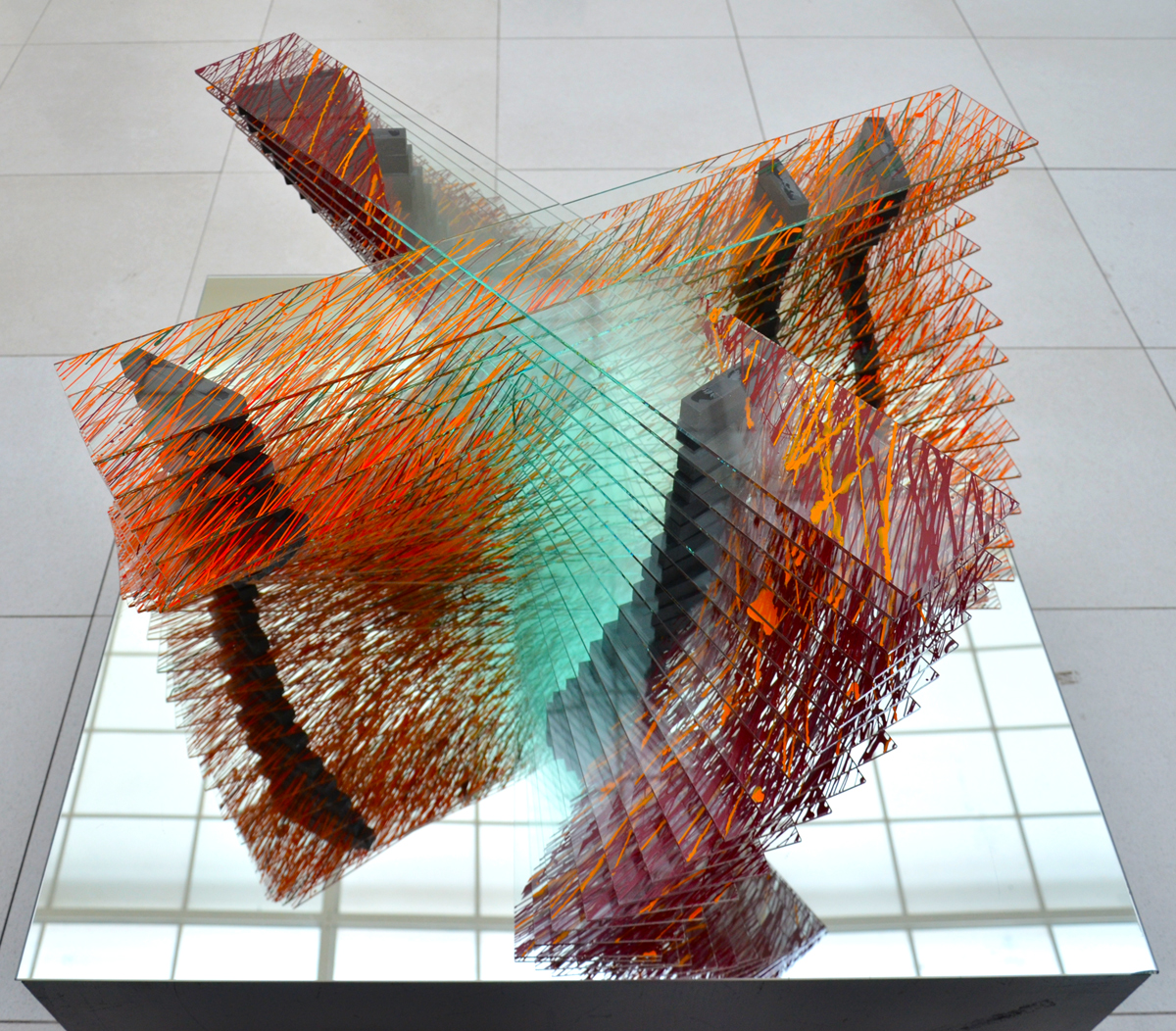
Carousel, 2006

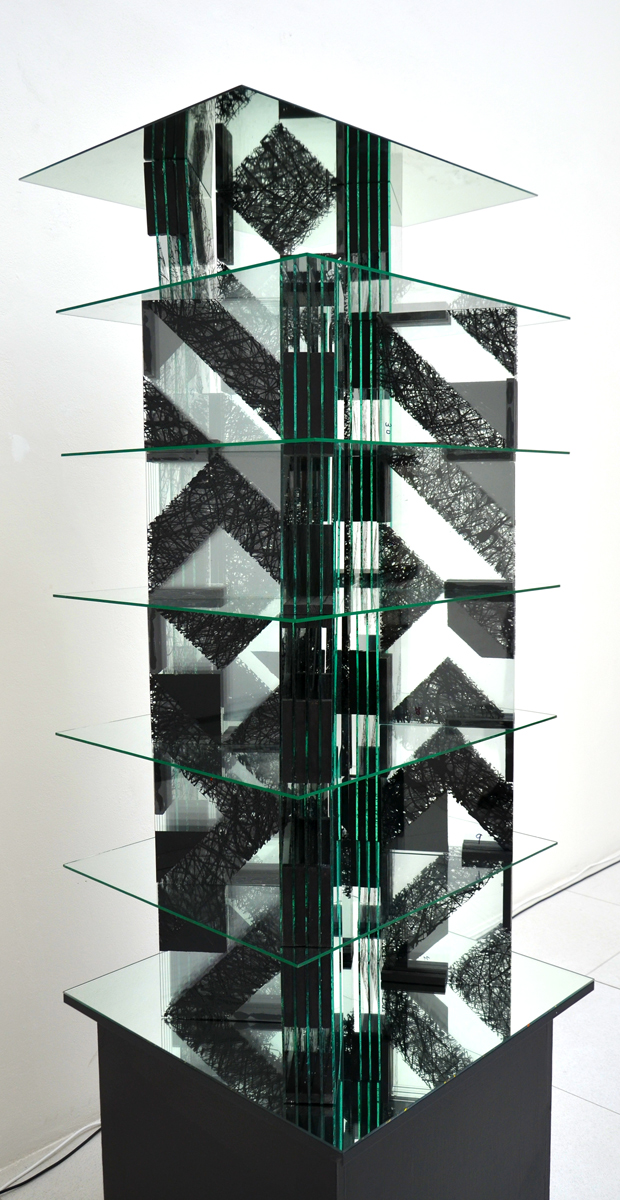
Babylon, 2012

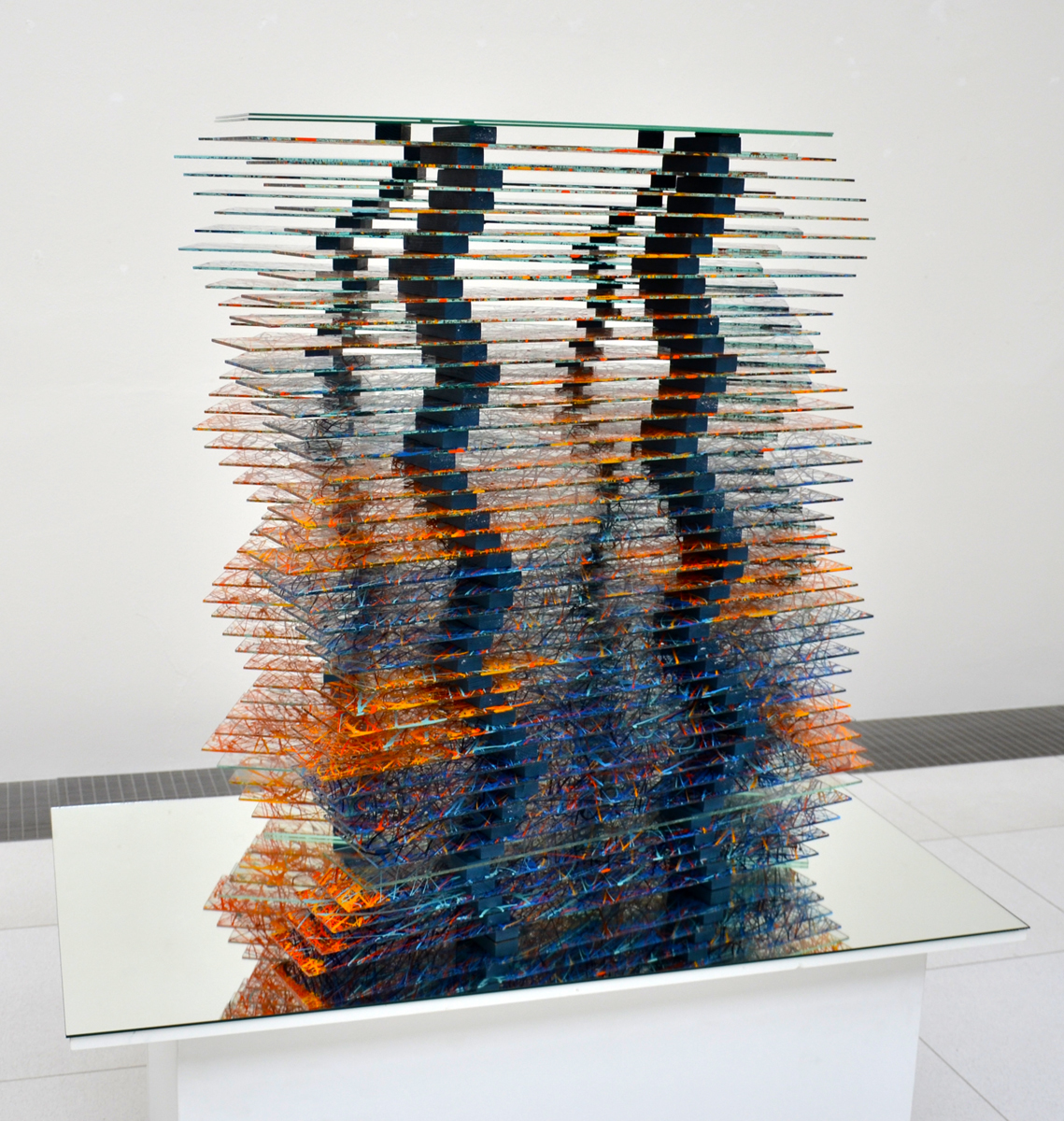
Depth, 2012-2014

=== Design ===
Jiřina Žertová is the author of drinking glass, metallurgical glass shaped from free hand and designs of decors of cut lead glass. She is also the author of several designs for architecture.

=== Representation in collections ===
- Centre Pompidou, Paříž
- Musée des Arts Décoratifs de la Ville, Lausanne
- The Corning Museum of Glass, New York
- Jacques Baruch Gallery, Chicago
- The Lannan Foundation of Contemporary Arts, Palm Beach
- Museum of Science and Industry, Los Angeles
- Kunstsammlungen der Veste, Coburg
- Kunstmuseum Düsseldorf
- Museum für Kunst und Gewerbe Hamburg
- Glasmuseum Ebeltoft
- Kunstforum Göhrde
- Steinberg Foundation, Kunstmuseum Liechtenstein
- Muzeum Narodowe, Wroclaw
- Museum of Decorative Arts in Prague
- Moravian Gallery in Brno
- North Bohemian Museum in Liberec
- East Bohemian Museum in Pardubice
- Museum of Glass and Jewellery in Jablonec nad Nisou
- Crystalex Nový Bor
- Cafesjian Art Trust in Shoreview, Minnesota, USA

=== Exhibitions ===
==== Solo ====
- 1973 Galerie Lobmeyer, Vienna
- 1975 North Bohemian Museum, Liberec
- 1982 Gallery Rob van den Doel, Gravenhage, Netherlands
- 1984, 1987 Galerie Centrum, Prague
- 1989 Heller Gallery, New York, Gallery Nakama, Tokyo
- 1990 Galerie Gottschalk-Betz, Frankfurt am Main, Clara Scremini Gallery, Paris, Galerie Sanske, Zürich
- 1992 Müller Gallery, New York, Silica gallery, Beverly Hills, Ca., USA
- 1994 The House at Jonáš, East Bohemia Gallery in Pardubice
- 1998 Bender-Boehringer - Zentrum, Vienna
- 1999 Gallery of Fine Arts in Ostrava
- 2001 Gallery of Fine Arts Znojmo
- 2005 Glasgalerie Hittfeld, Hamburg
- 2006 Leo Kaplan Modern, New York
- 2008 Galerie Aspekt, Brno
- 2013 Jiřina Žertová, Vladimír Kopecký: Convergence, East Bohemia Gallery Pardubice
- 2014 Nová síň Gallery, Prague
- 2017 Špilberk Gallery, Brno

==== Collective (selection) ====
- 1984 Modern Czechoslovak Glass Sculptures, Copenhagen, Contemporary Glass in Europe, Strasbourg
- 1985 Coburger Glaspreis, Coburg, Glassymposium Süssmuth
- 1986 Contemporary Czech Glass, London, Birmingham, Modern International Glass Art, Ebeltoft, DK, Tchechoslowakisch Glas in Austria, Wien, Salzburg
- 1987 Vidre D art, Ajuntament de Barcelona, Czech Cultural Centre Warszawa, Wien
- 1988 Artistes Verries de Tchécoslovaquie, Bruxelles, Kopecký + Freunde, Frankfurt am Main
- 1989 Contemporary European Crystal and Glass Sculptures, Liége, 18 Verriers Tcheque aux Musée Suisse du Vitrail, Romont, Verres de Boheme, Musée des Arts Décoratifs, Paris, Verriers Tcheque aux Centre International du Vitrail, Chartres
- 1990 International Exhibition of Glass, Kanazawa, Japan, Neues Glas in Europa, Düsseldorf
- 1991 Configura, Kunst in Europe, Erfurt, Prague Glas Prize, Mánes, Praha
- 1992 Prague Glass Prize, Heller Gallery, New York
- 1993 Bohemia Crystal, Segovia
- 1994 Glass of the 20th century, Museum of East Bohemia in Pardubice, Prager Glaskunst, Bamberg
- 1996 International Glass Exhibition, Palazzo Ducale, Venezia
- 1997 Glaskunst aus Tchechien, Wien
- 1999 Exhibition: Czech Glass, China
- 2000 Light - Transfigured, Hida Takayama Museum of Art, Gifu, Japan, Euro - Fire in the Land of Liége
- 2001 Sensitive Touch, Studio Glass Gallery, London
- 2001-2011 Verrailes, Galerie Internationale du Verre, Biot, France
- 2003, 2006, 2012 International Glass Symposium, Crystalex, Nový Bor
- 2004 International Exhibition of Glass, Kanazawa, Japan, Leo Kaplan Modern, New York
- 2005 Expo 2005, Aichi, Japan
- 2007 Czech Glass / 1945-1980 (Creation in the Age of Misery and Illusion), National Gallery in Prague
- 2009 Crossing borders, Glasmuseet Ebeltoft, Glass Friends in Contemporary Glass Sculpture, Litvak gallery, Tel Aviv, Mánes Union of Fine Arts (1887 - 2009), Berlin, Bratislava
- 2010 New Sensitivity, National Art Museum of China, Beijing, Mánes Union of Fine Arts, Diamant Gallery, Prague
- 2011 Freedom to Create, Litvak Gallery, Tel Aviv
- 2012 Jubilants of Mánes, Diamant Gallery, Prague
- 2012/13 Happy Birthday! Czech Glass Art, Museum of Decorative Arts in Prague
- 2018/2019 Two in One: Czech and Slovak Glass Design 1918-2018, Museum of Glass and Jewellery in Jablonec nad Nisou
- 2019/2020 Melting Edge, Portheimka Museum of Glass, Prague
- 2020 S.V.U. Mánes, Rabas Gallery, Nová síň pod Vysokou bránou, Rakovník
- 2021 Generation S.V.U. Mánes, St. Anne's Church, Jablonec nad Nisou

== Sources ==
monographs

- Klára Jirková (ed.), Jiřina Žertová: Not Only Glass, 242 p., nakl. KAVKA, Prague 2022, ISBN 978-80-90-908575-0-6

catalogues

- Stehlík František, Jiřina Žertová: Glass Definitions, cat. 24 p., North Bohemian Museum Liberec 1975
- Jiřina Žertová: Glass, author unknown, cat. 6 p., ČFVU Dílo, Prague 1987
- Křen Ivo, Jiřina Žertová, cat. 16 p., Gallery of Fine Arts in Ostrava 2000
- Rossini Pavla, Jiřina Žertová: Selected works 1979-2012, cat. 54 p., English, private print, also Neues Glass 2012
- Křen Ivo, Bouček Vít, Convergence: Jiřina Žertová, Vladimír Kopecký, East Bohemian Museum in Pardubice 2013, ISBN 978-80-85112-74-0

collective publications

- Šindelář Dušan, Contemporary Art Glass in Czechoslovakia, 112 p., Obelisk, Prague, 1970
- Adlerová Kudělková Königová Alena, Contemporary Glass, 71 p., Odeon, Prague, 1979 (English edition)
- Ricke Helmut, Neues Glas in Europa. 50 Künstler, 50 Konzepte, Düsseldorf 1990
- Langhamer Antonín, Legenda o českém skle / The Legend of Bohemian Glass / Legende vom böhmischen Glas, 292 p., TIGRIS spol. s r. o., Zlín, 1999, ISBN 80-86062-02-3
- Petrová Sylva, Czech Glass, 283 p., (awarded as the most beautiful book of 2001), Gallery, Prague, 2001, ISBN 80-86010-44-9
- Křen Ivo, Permanent Exhibition of Czech Glass, East Bohemian Museum in Pardubice 2006, ISBN 80-86046-91-5

articles

- Kohoutová Marie, On first and second place - and also on missed chances and changes in the passage of time with Jiřina Žertová, Glassrevue 16, 2003, pp. 3–4

encyclopedia

- New Encyclopedia of Czech Visual Art, ed. Horová Anděla, Academia Praha, 1995, ISBN 80-200-0522-6
- Dictionary of Czech and Slovak Visual Artists, ed. Malá Alena, Chagall Art Centre, Ostrava, 2010, ISBN 978-80-86171-35-7
