= Quadrio (Prague) =

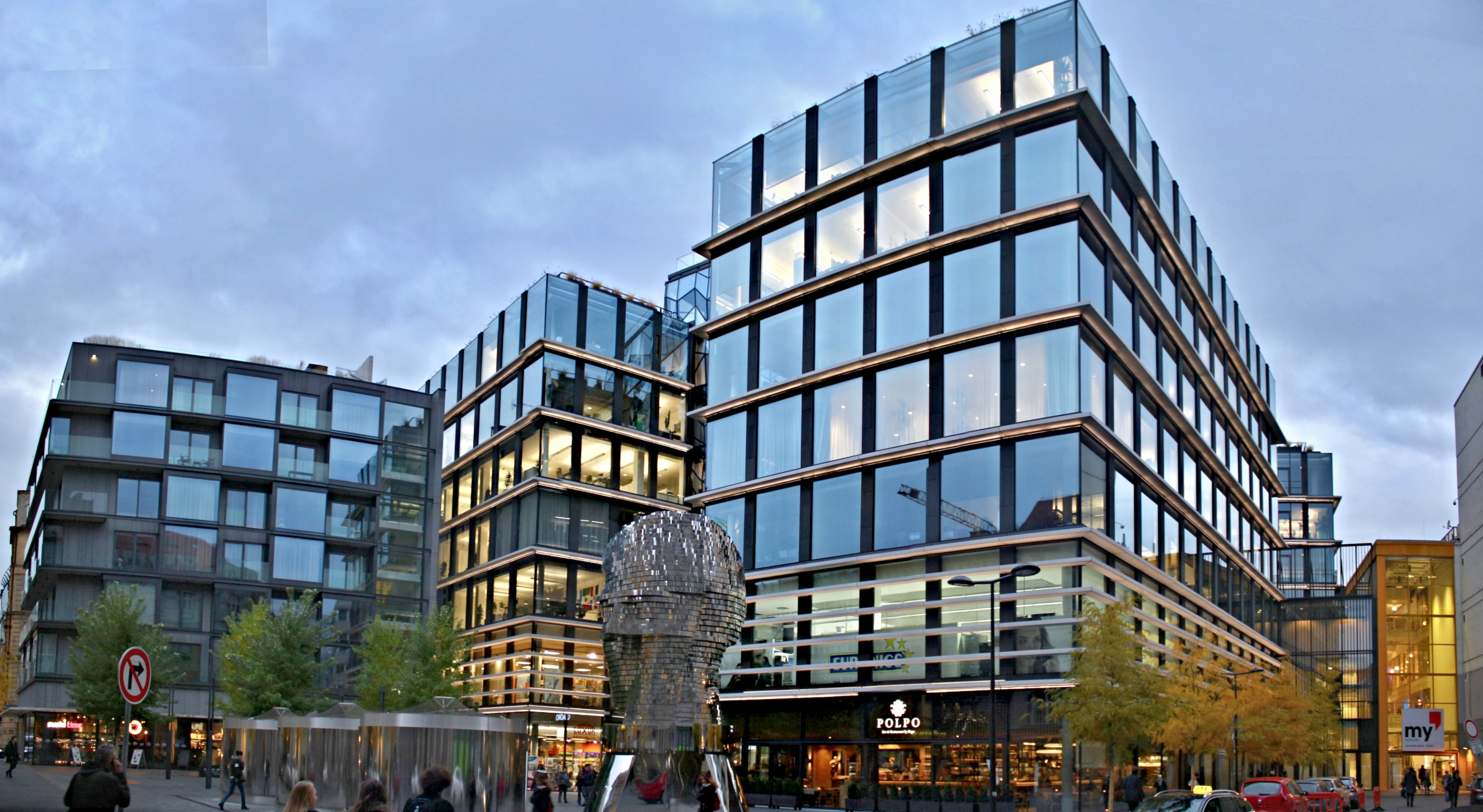
- Quadrio complex in 2016, Head of Franz Kafka in front
- Interactive map of the Quadrio area

General information
- Location: Spálená 2121/22, Prague 1, Czech Republic, 120 00, Prague
- Coordinates: 50°4′53″N 14°25′12″E
- Construction started: 2012
- Completed: 2014

Height
- Height: 35 m

Technical details
- Floor count: 8

Design and construction
- Architect: Jakub Cigler Architects

Website
- quadrio.cz

Quadrio is a multifunctional complex in the centre of Prague, Czech Republic, at metro station Národní třída. It serves mainly as shopping centre, and it is also containing offices and residential building. It is also connected with Shopping house Máj, which was built in 1975. Construction of Quadrio complex took place between 2012 and 2014. The building has three underground and eight above-ground floors. Investor of the project was European real estate investor CPI Property Group. It was designer by Czech architectonic atelier Jakub Cigler Architects.

The kinetic sculpture Head of Franz Kafka by David Černý is located next to the complex.
