= Head of David Lynch =

Sculpture by David Černý

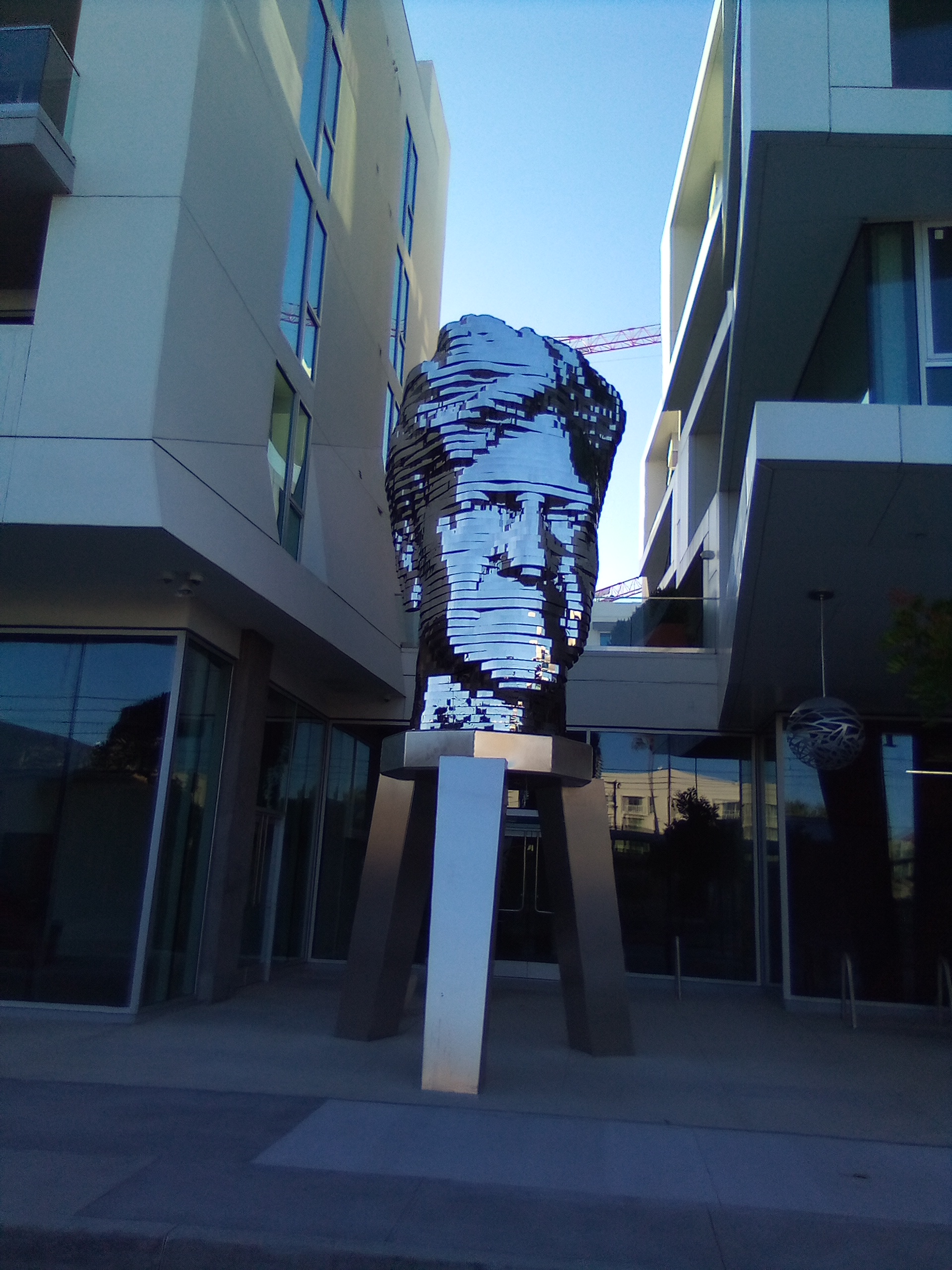
- Artist: David Černý
- Subject: David Lynch
- Location: 1550 Lincoln Ave. Santa Monica, CA
- Coordinates: 34°1′0.18″N 118°29′17.62″W

Head of David Lynch, also known as Eraserhead, is a public art sculpture titled depicting the head of David Lynch by Czech artist David Černý, consisting of a 21 foot tall rotating metallic likeness of the head of the filmmaker David Lynch. It was unveiled in April 2024 in downtown Santa Monica at the intersection of Colorado Avenue and Lincoln Boulevard.

The permanent steel sculpture was budgeted at $1,000,000 and stands 21' tall. The sculpture is made of several rotating strips that either form abstract images or Lynch. The sculpture rotates twenty four hours a day, seven days a week and is virtually silent.

The sculpture resides in front of the 1550 Lincoln apartment complex. The property was developed by NMS Properties under a provision by the city government that 2% of the construction costs of all new developments must be put towards public art.

The sculpture resembles Černý's rotating sculpture, Head of Franz Kafka. Černý chose Lynch because Černý almost became a filmmaker and Lynch's work deeply moved him.
