= František Vízner =

Czech glass artist (1936–2011)

- Vízner in 2011
- Born: 9 March 1936; Prague, Czechoslovakia
- Died: 1 July 2011 (aged 75); Brno, Czech Republic
- Education: Academy of Applied Arts, Prague (VŠUP)
- Website: frantisekvizner.com

František Vízner (9 March 1936 – 1 July 2011) was a Czech glass artist and designer. He began his career as a designer at Sklo Union, producing pressed glass designs for mass production. In 1977, he left the commercial industry to pursue independent studio work. Despite his small annual output, his work achieved widespread recognition and is held in numerous public collections.

== Career ==
Labyrinth/maze pressed glass vase, 1965

František Vízner was born 9 March 1936 in Prague, Czechoslovakia. From 1951 to 1956, he studied at the glassmaking schools in Nový Bor and Železný Brod, where he learnt glass painting, casting, modelling, and glass mosaic. Vízner completed his studies at the Academy of Applied Arts (VŠUP) in Prague, graduating in 1962 with a dissertation on pressed glass.

In 1961, Vízner started working for the T-VS design office, in the Sklo Union, while still a student. Collaborating with industry was a normal part of coursework for students at the time. Vízner's 1961 vase design was his first design to go into production, at the Libochovice glassworks. After graduating, he worked as a pressed glass designer at the Sklo Union glassworks, near Teplice, until 1967. During this period, Vízner produced several pressed glass designs, including vases, jardinieres, and candlesticks.

In 1967, Vízner left Sklo Union to become a designer at the Škrdlovice glassworks, where he worked with hot-shaped glass. He remained there until 1977, when he left the commercial industry and founded his own art studio. He then worked primarily with cut glass from his studio in Žďár nad Sázavou until his death. Bowl and vase forms produced with a grindstone were characteristic of his work.

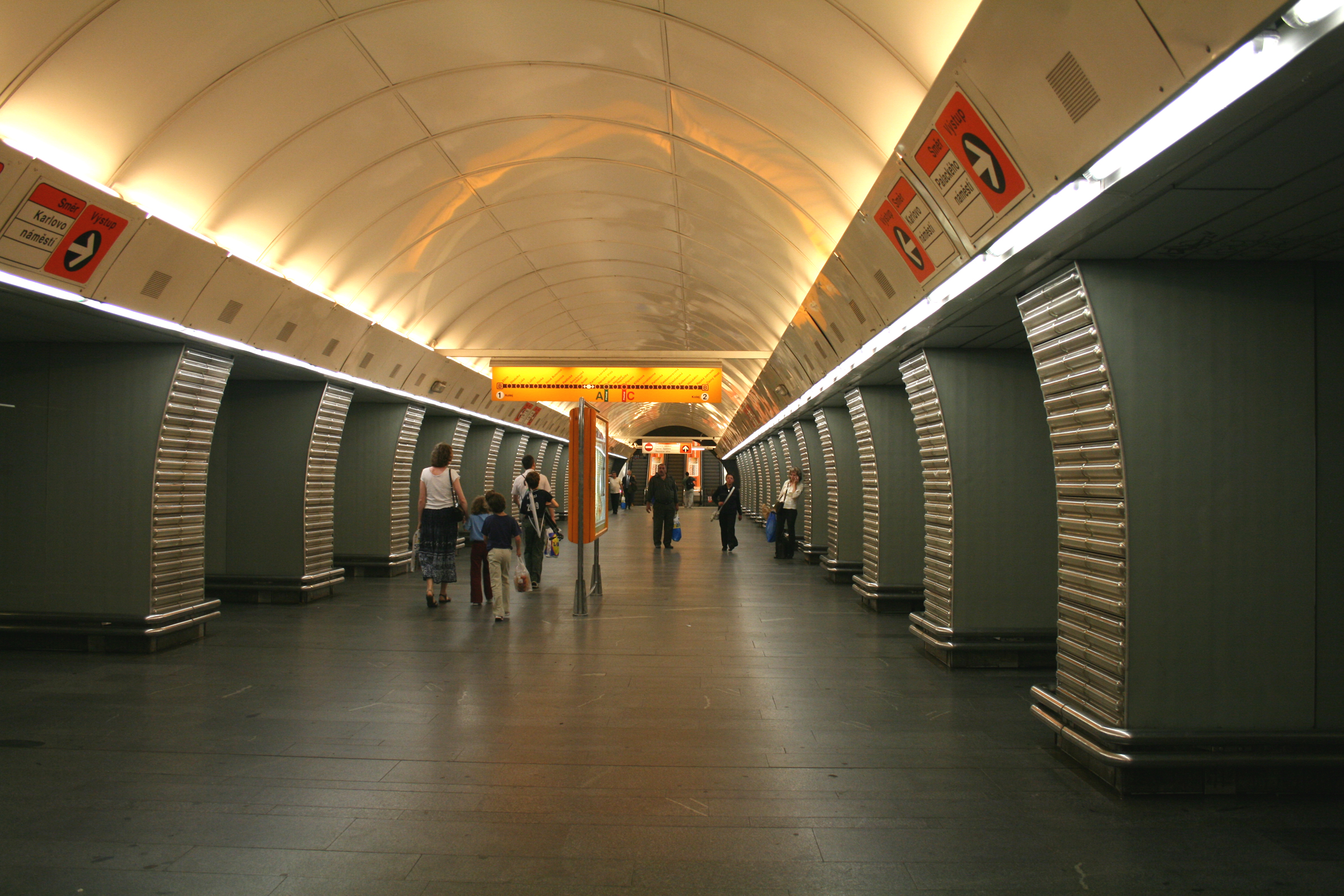
Karlovo náměstí station

In 1985, Vízner designed the entrance space and platform cladding at Karlovo náměstí station on the Prague Metro, using interlocking elements of colourless pressed glass produced by the Kavalier glassworks. This was the only pressed glass design by Vízner produced outside the four main Sklo Union factories. By 1985, Vízner had adopted new surface finishing techniques and began working with lead glass. He also introduced brighter colours, including bright red, intense orange, and deep green. The popularity of his work during the 1990s led to many variations in the shapes and sizes of his established forms.

Vízner died on 1 July 2011 in Brno, after a long illness.

== Style ==
Marcus Newhall noted the influence of Vízner's earlier pressed glass design experience on his later studio work. He described Vízner's later pieces as retaining a "modernist philosophy" rooted in "the pragmatics of functionalism and mass production" and remaining "firmly based in the T-VS design office and the pressing shops of Sklo Union". As an independent artist, Vízner explored pure forms and the tension between function and sculpture. Milan Hlaveš observed that, as in his earlier design work, Vízner's later cut-glass objects made use of simple geometric forms such as cylinders, spheres, hemispheres, and prisms.

William Warmus describes Vízner's work as rooted in international Constructivism, reflecting Vízner's own view that his "basic approach is constructive" and that he developed his talent through "architecture, order, and hope, stemming from clarity of form". Warmus also identifies a sense of de-constructivism in Vízner's work, evident in its removal of artistic affectation in favour of essential forms. The restrained shapes of Vízner's vessels are a result of a range of technical processes, including grinding, drilling, and boring. Although his finished pieces have been described as minimalist, Warmus considers the techniques to be minimalist and the results "classic".

Warmus describes Vízner's Bowl with a Peak as "the greatest example" of his "concentrated classicism". The design originated in 1964–1965 as a pressed-glass design which did not enter mass production. He cut the first example himself in 1971, and produced a set of "replicas" in various colours between 1971 and 1980.

Vízner's hot-shaped glass designs are less well known than his studio work. They often feature strong colour contrasts and unusual texture manipulation.

== Legacy ==
Vízner influenced the Studio glass movement in the United States, with some of his work included in the Corning Museum of Glass' 1979 exhibition, New Glass: A Worldwide Survey.

In 2009, Vízner was inducted into the Czech Grand Design Hall of Fame for his "significant contribution to Czech design".

Vízner described himself as one of the "slowest" glass artists, producing only a small number of works each year.

Vízner's work has achieved widespread recognition and examples are held in the collections of the National Gallery Prague, the Museum of Decorative Arts in Prague, the Metropolitan Museum of Art, the National Museum of Modern Art, Tokyo, the Victoria and Albert Museum, the Musée des Arts Décoratifs, the Corning Museum of Glass, and numerous other public and private collections.

== Awards ==
- 1974 – Head Prize, 1st Quadriennale des Kunsthandwerks sozialistischer Länder (Quadrennial of Arts and Crafts from Socialist Countries), Erfurt, East Germany
- 1978 – Bayrischer Staatspreis (Bavarian State Prize, Gold Medal), Internationale Handwerksmesse (Exempla '78), Munich, West Germany
- 1984 – 2nd Prize for exhibited set of glass, Mezinárodní výstava uměleckých řemesel – WCC (International Exhibition of Arts and Crafts – World Crafts Council), Bratislava, Czechoslovakia

== Gallery ==
Blue pressed glass vase (1962)

Lens Optic patterned vase (1962/63)

Untitled (1992) in the Indianapolis Museum of Art

Untitled (1993) in the Indianapolis Museum of Art

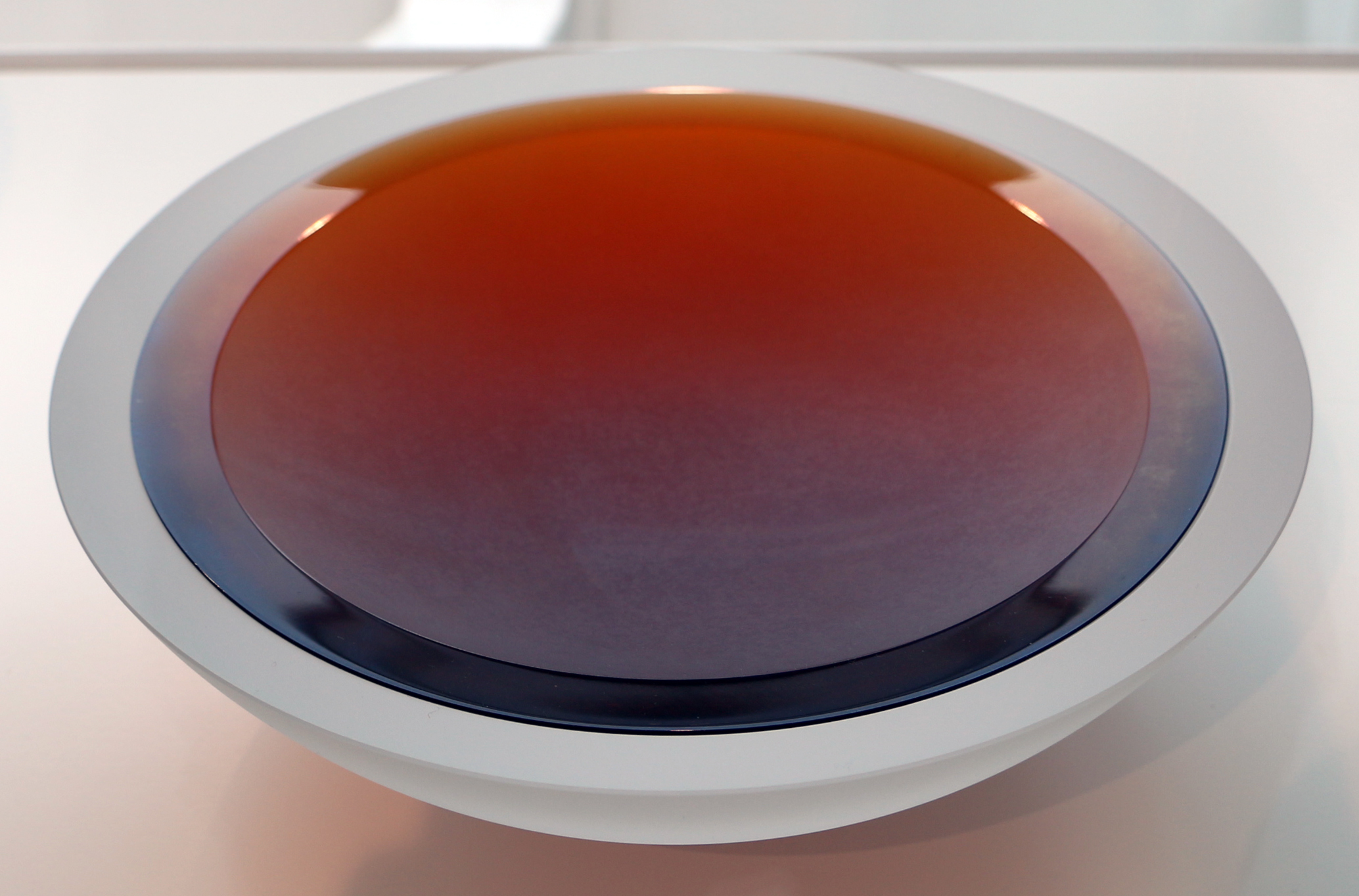
Bowl (c.1990–2000) in the Milwaukee Art Museum

== Sources ==
- Newhall, Marcus (2008). Sklo Union: Art Before Industry: 20th Century Czech Pressed Glass. Hope Fountain Books. ISBN 9780956062307.
- Petrová, Sylva (2001). Czech Glass. ISBN 9788086010458.
