= Café Slavia =

Café in Prague

Coordinates: 50°4′54″N 14°24′48″E

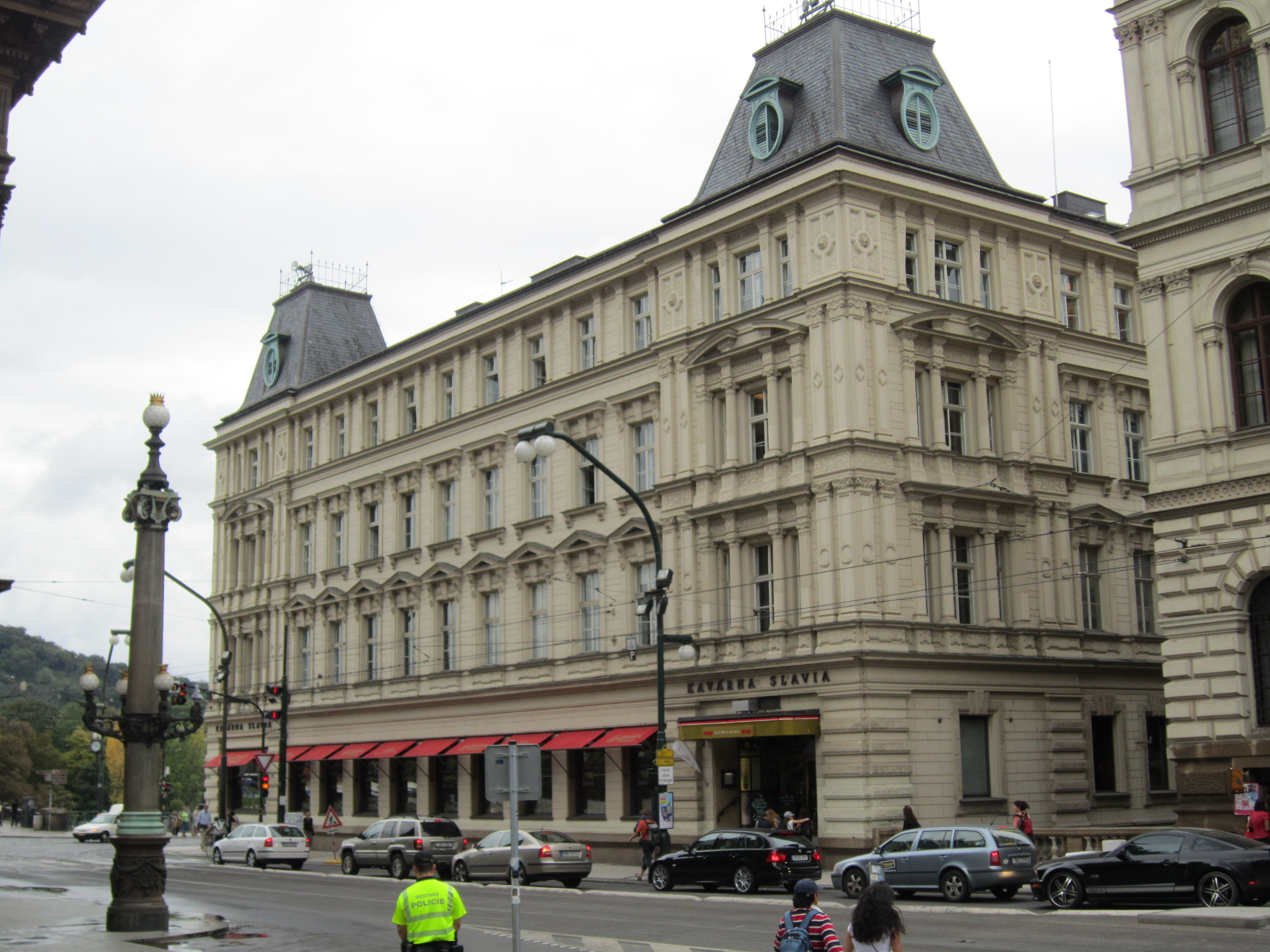
Café Slavia

Café Slavia is a café in Prague, Czech Republic, located on the corner of Národní street and Smetanovo nábřeží, next to the Vltava river and opposite the National Theatre. It was opened in August 1884. Poet and novelist Rainer Maria Rilke regularly spent time in the café. It was known for its associations with Prague's dissident community, hosting people such as Václav Havel, who would later become his country's president, and poet Jiří Kolář during the normalization period. It was also known as a place for writers, poets and other intellectuals to meet and discuss their ideas. The café was closed in 1992 due to a legal dispute but re-opened in 1997. Café Slavia has been described as Prague's "best-known café".

The Neo-Renaissance palace

The monumental Neo-Renaissance palace built for Count Prokop Lažanský was constructed between 1861 and 1863. It was one of the last palace buildings in Prague to be conceived from the outset as a combination of a representative aristocratic residence, an apartment house, and administrative premises.

From 1863 to 1869, the renowned Czech composer, Bedřich Smetana, also lived and worked here. The laying of the foundation stone of the National Theatre in 1868 and its subsequent opening in 1881 significantly influenced the later history of the palace.

Café Slavia opening

In 1881, the well-known Prague entrepreneur Václav Zoufalý obtained a permit to operate a café in the vacant ground-floor premises of the palace and established two interconnected café rooms. In 1882, a café named “Nová Slavia” (New Slavia)) was opened in the palace. Its name was inspired by the ideas of Czech national consciousness and Pan-Slavism. In 1883, the café was further enhanced and received a new entrance portal. On 30 August 1884, it was ceremonially reopened under the name Kavárna Slavia (Café Slavia).

Major Art Deco reconstruction

A major Art Deco reconstruction of the café was carried out between 1931 and 1932 by Václav Fišer and his nephew Jaroslav Štěrba in cooperation with architect Oldřich Stefan. The renovated Slavia, featuring marble and wood-paneled walls, leather booths, large mirrors, and round tables, became one of the jewels of Prague’s café culture. The renovation involved not only demolishing the remaining partition walls but also installing large windows that opened up magnificent views of Prague’s panorama and visually connected café patrons more closely with street life. The café was equipped with its famous cloakroom lifts, efficient mechanical ventilation, and modern sanitary facilities. The premises were expanded to include what is now known as Parnas. The famous painting ”The Absinthe Drinker”, by Czech painter, Viktor Oliva, was installed in the premises.

Café Slavia, the cultural and social life crossroad of Prague

In the 1920s, Marina Tsvetaeva, a Russian poet and writer also became a regular visitor. She frequently stopped at the café on her way from the editorial office of the journal Will of Russia (Vůle Ruska). She was often accompanied by fellow Russian émigrés writers, including Arkady Averchenko, Yevgeny Chirikov, Alexei Remizov.

During the long years of German occupation in the Second World War, social life gradually faded and the café in the Lažanský Palace stagnated. Masaryk Embankment was renamed Heydrich Embankment, and Národní Avenue became Victoriastrasse. Café Slavia was renamed Kaffee “Viktoria und Konditorei”.

After the liberation of Czechoslovakia in 1945, the café regained its original name, Slavia. In 1948, it was nationalized. Nevertheless, its vibrant social and cultural life continued. From the late 1940s through the 1960s, Prague became a refuge and meeting place for left-wing writers from around the world. Authors such as Brazilian writer Jorge Amado”, Chilean poet Pablo Neruda, Turkish poet, Nâzım Hikmet, Salvadorean partisan and poet, Roque, famous Cuban poet Nicolás Guillén, Argentine writer Alfredo Varela, one of the most celebrated Arab poet Muhammad Mahdi Al-Jawahiri, Colombian writer Gabriel García Márquez, met here with their Czech counterparts, including Jan Drda, Vítězslav Nezval, Marie Majerová Many of these meetings took place in the Café Slavia itself.

Over the years, the café was also frequented by leading Czech painters such Jiří Kolář, Jan Zrzavý, Kamil Lhoták, as well as distinguished film directors including the world famous Miloš Forman and Emil Kusturica.
