= Národní třída (Prague Metro) =

Prague metro station

Coordinates: 50.080°N 14.420°E

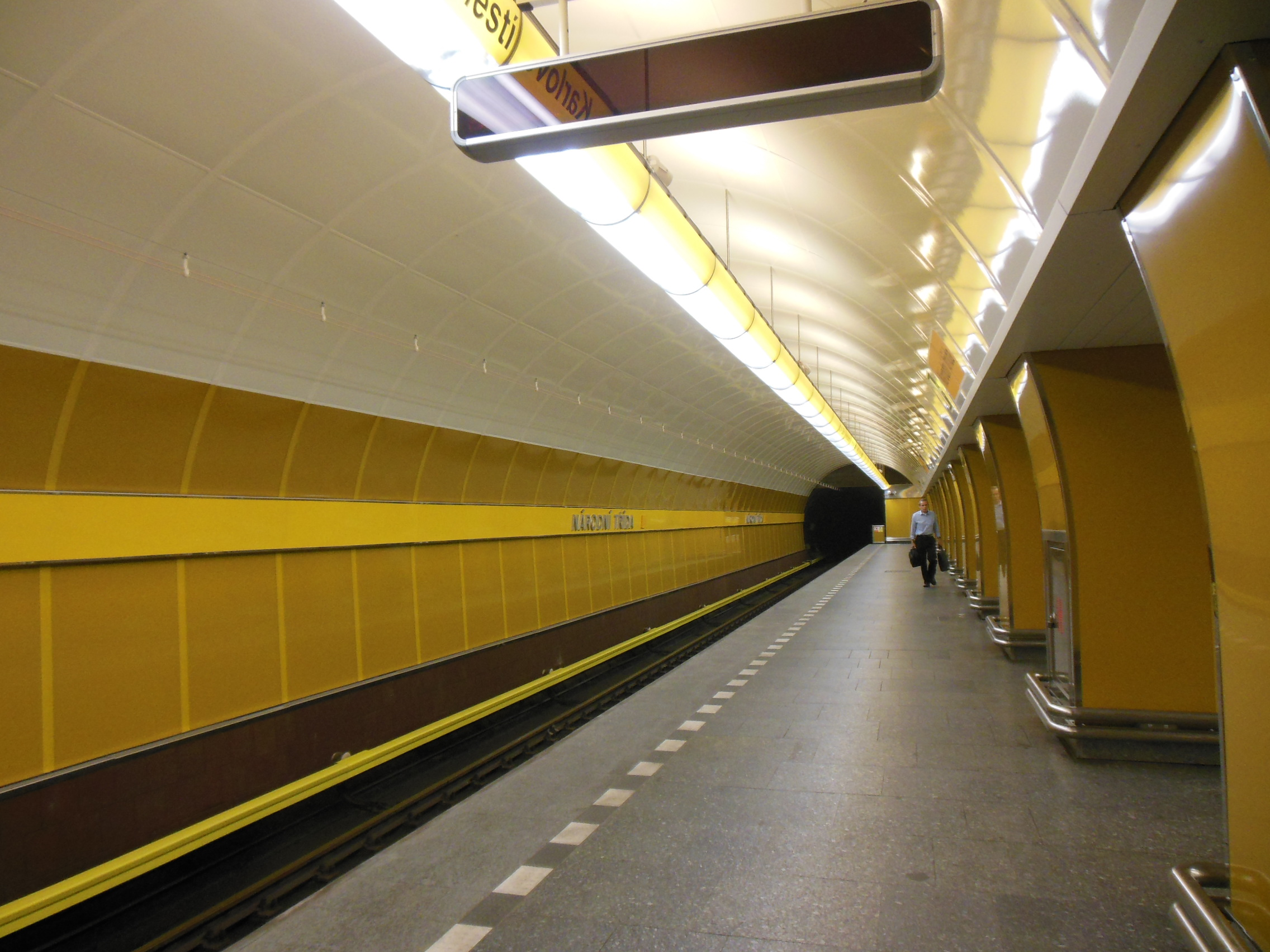

General information
- Location: Spálená street Nové Město, Prague 1 Prague; Czech Republic
- System: Prague Metro
- Platforms: 1 island platform
- Tracks: 2

Construction
- Structure type: Underground
- Depth: 309 m (1,014 ft)
- Accessible: Yes

Other information
- Fare zone: PID: Prague

History
- Opened: 2 November 1985; 40 years ago

Services
Preceding station	Prague Metro	Following station
Karlovo náměstí toward Zličín	Line B	Můstek toward Černý Most
Location

Národní třída ("Avenue of the Nation", Czech pronunciation: [ˈnaːrodɲiː ˈtr̝iːda]) is a Prague Metro station on Line B. The station has two exits, one to Spálená street where it connects to the tram network and other to M. D. Rettigové street, using a pair of lifts. The station was opened on 2 November 1985, as part of the inaugural section of Line B between Sokolovská and Smíchovské nádraží.

The station was closed between July 2012 and June 2014 due to construction of a new shopping and business centre called Quadrio. Trains only passed through the station without stopping.

== Characteristics ==
Národní třída is a pylon type metro station with three supports.

== See also ==
- Národní třída
