= Karlovo náměstí (Prague Metro) =

Prague metro station

Coordinates: 50.076°N 14.418°E

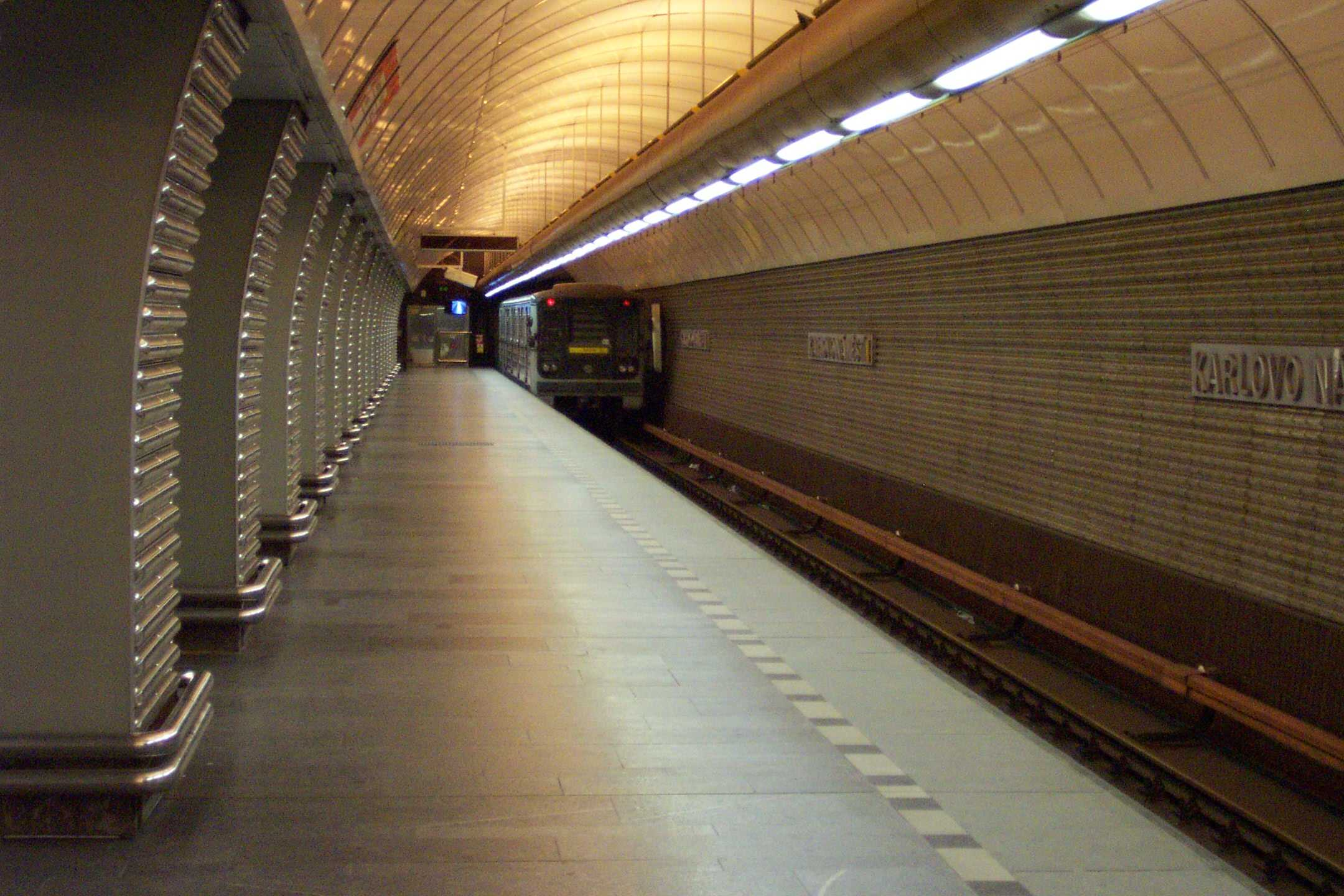

General information
- Location: Nové Město, Prague 2 Prague; Czech Republic
- System: Prague Metro
- Platforms: 1 island platform
- Tracks: 2

Construction
- Structure type: Underground
- Depth: 40 m (130 ft)
- Accessible: Yes

Other information
- Fare zone: PID: Prague

History
- Opened: 2 November 1985; 40 years ago

Services
Preceding station	Prague Metro	Following station
Anděl toward Zličín	Line B	Národní třída toward Černý Most
Location

Karlovo náměstí (Czech pronunciation: [ˈkarlovo ˈnaːmɲɛsciː]) is a Prague Metro station on Line B. Its name is Czech for "Charles Square", after the plaza to which it is adjacent. The station has two exits, one leading to Charles Square and the other to Palacký Square (Czech: Palackého náměstí), both of which are major tram hubs. The station was opened on 2 November 1985, as part of the inaugural section of Line B between Sokolovská and Smíchovské nádraží.

== Station characteristics ==
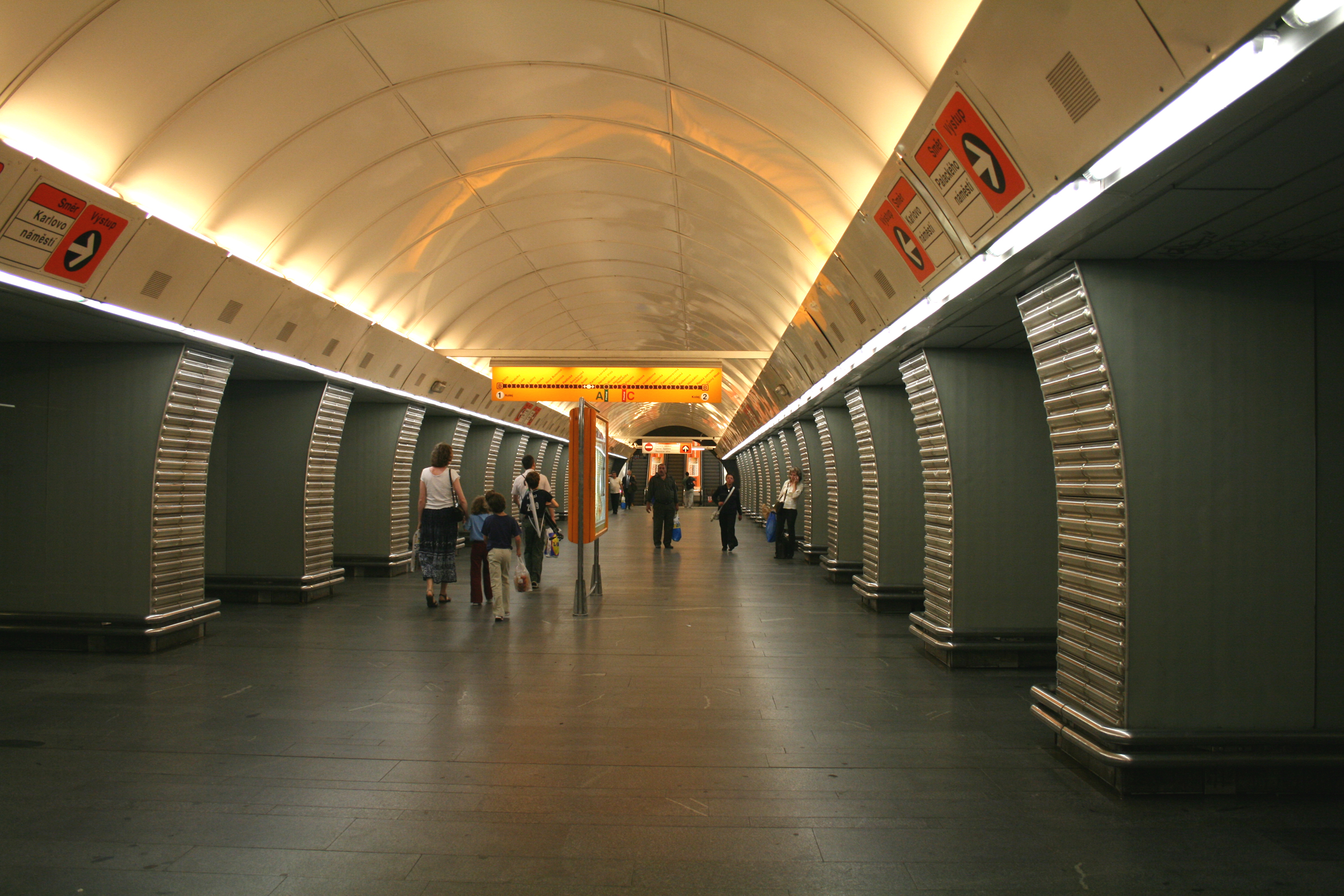

Karlovo náměstí is a pylon station with 3 supports. The depth of the station is 40 metres and it is 165 metres long, including service rooms. The length of the middle tunnel is the same as the length of platforms. The interior design consists of metal tubing (station tunnels leading to other stations feature concrete design). The facing consists of glass blocks, designed by František Vízner, placed over a beige colour film. Similar designs are used in other stations of the B line. The same blocks, despite their size, were in use on Jinonice station. The transfer corridor walls are faced by CONNEX glass (as in most of the B line stations).
