= Head of Franz Kafka =

Sculpture in Prague, Czech Republic

- Hlava Franze Kafky (Czech)
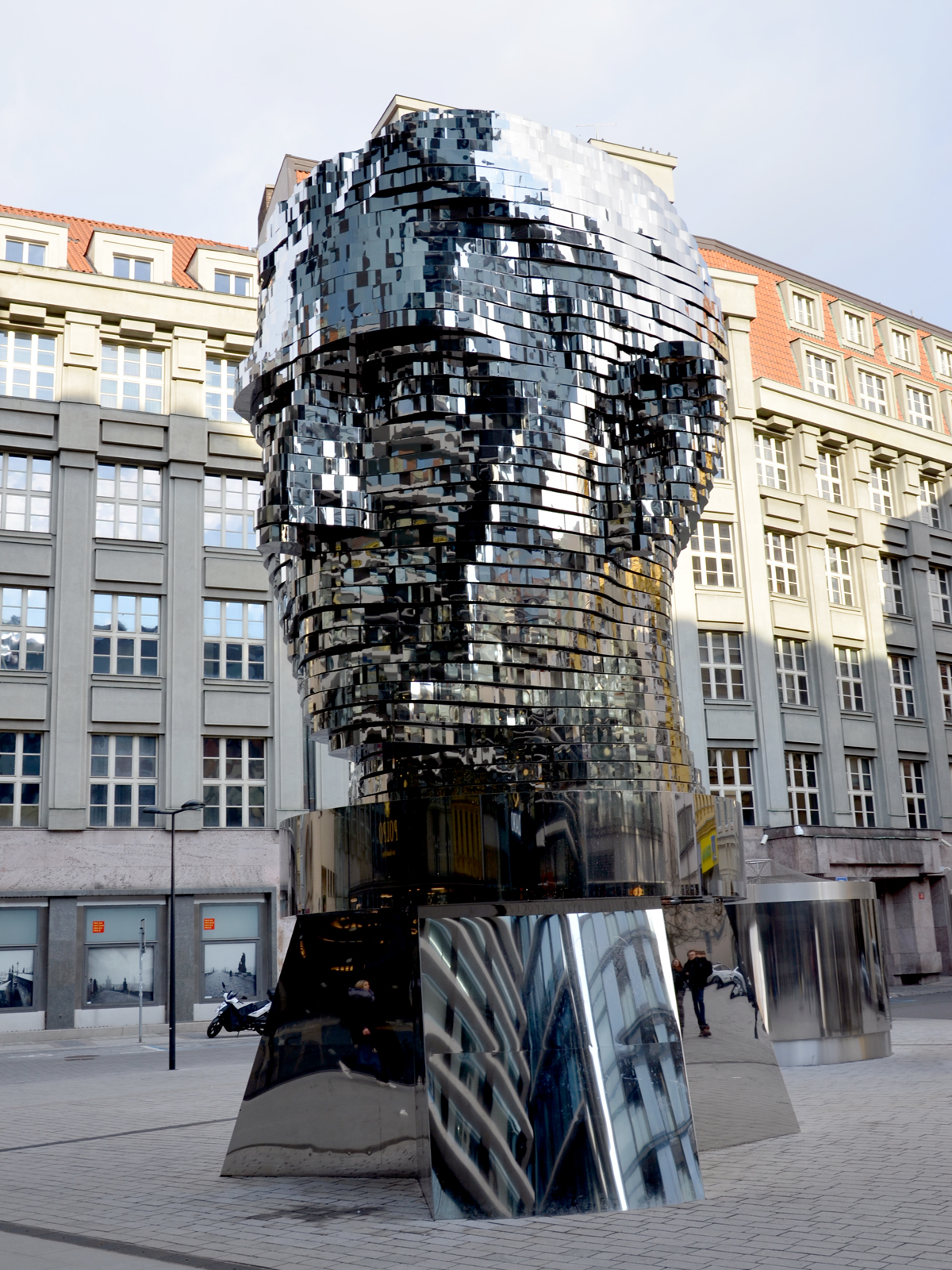
- The sculpture in 2014
- Artist: David Černý
- Subject: Franz Kafka
- Location: Prague, Czech Republic; 50°04′54″N 14°25′15″E

The Head of Franz Kafka (Czech: Hlava Franze Kafky), also known as the Statue of Kafka, is an outdoor kinetic sculpture by David Černý depicting Czech German-language writer Franz Kafka, installed on 31 October 2014 outside of the Quadrio shopping mall in Prague, Czech Republic.

The price was 30 million crowns, paid by the investor CPI Property Group together with the adjacent Quadrio complex.

Kafka himself worked in the nearby building of a saving bank.

== Description ==
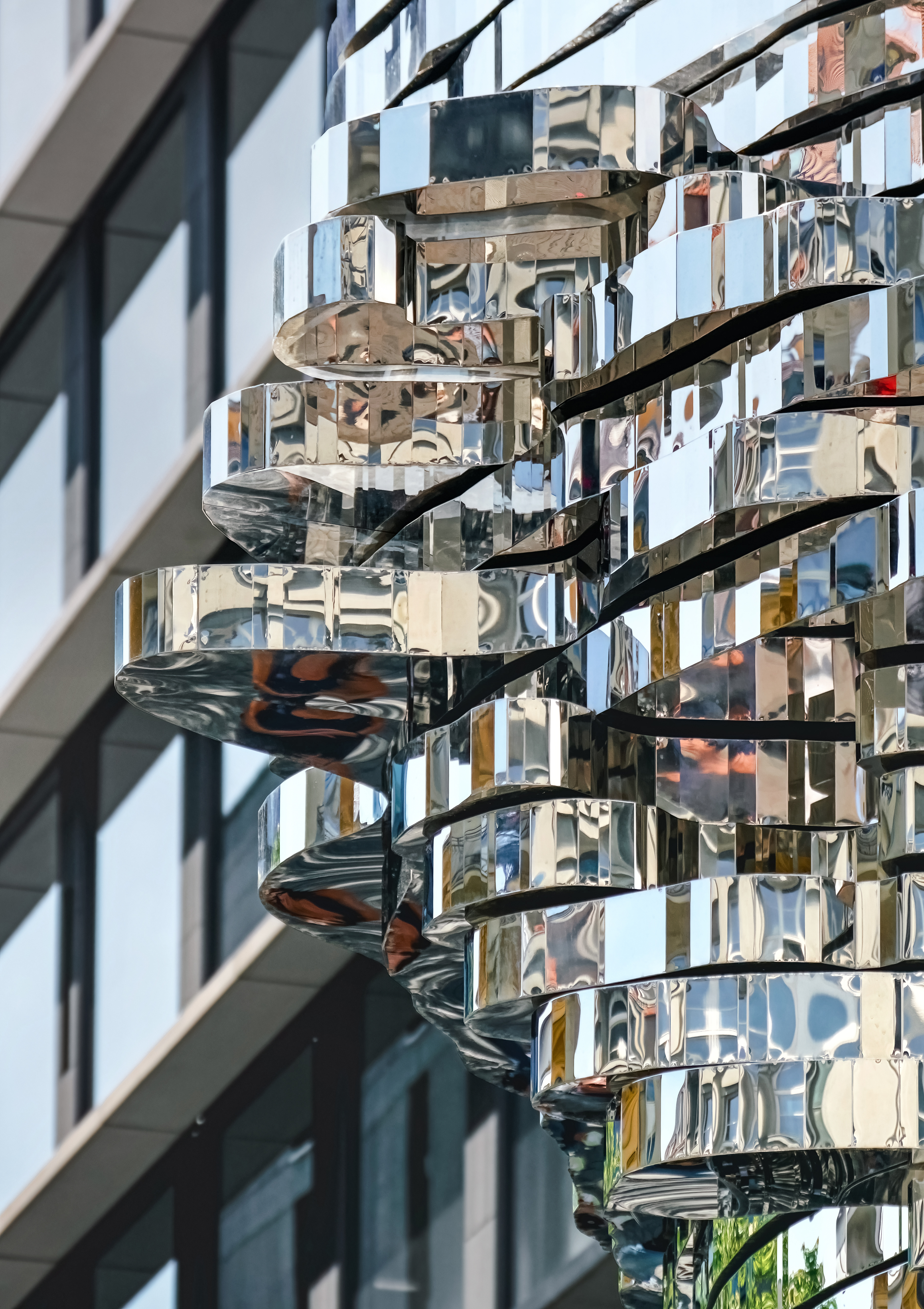
Detail of the sculpture in motion

The kinetic sculpture is 10.6 metres tall and made of 42 rotating stainless-steel panels weighing 24 tonnes in total. Each layer is mechanized and rotates individually. Inside, there are 21 motor modules and 1 kilometre of cables.

The programming of the sculpture's movements can be changed and the artist can create new choreographies. The trade-off of this dynamicism is the high effort required in maintenance, as servicing must be done every fortnight.

== Criticism ==
Critics point out that the statue is more an advertising billboard for the mall than a work of art. Critics charge that the statue lacks a connection to Kafka's work, and that this shiny, glittering, and fascinating attraction lacks humility and sensitivity. When viewers look at the visually attractive and technologically perfect sculpture, they miss the lost and brooding soul of Franz Kafka.

Others disagree, arguing that the complexity of the steel panels and the change of form of the statue in time captures Kafka's work quite well. The statue attracts lots of visitors, so it has increased Kafka's presence in Prague.
