= Národní (Prague) =

Street in Czechia

Coordinates: 50°04′48″N 14°25′13″E

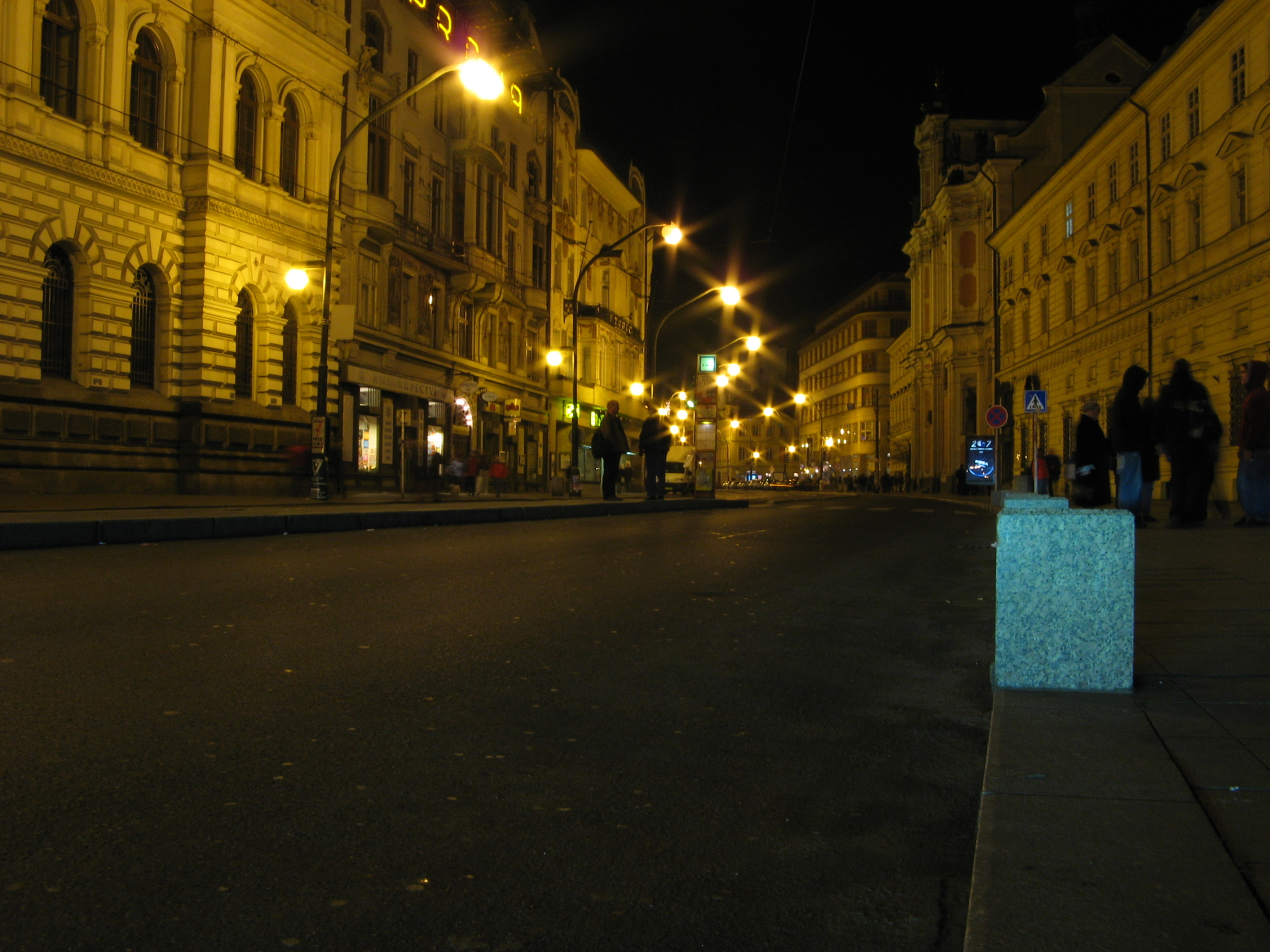
Národní třída

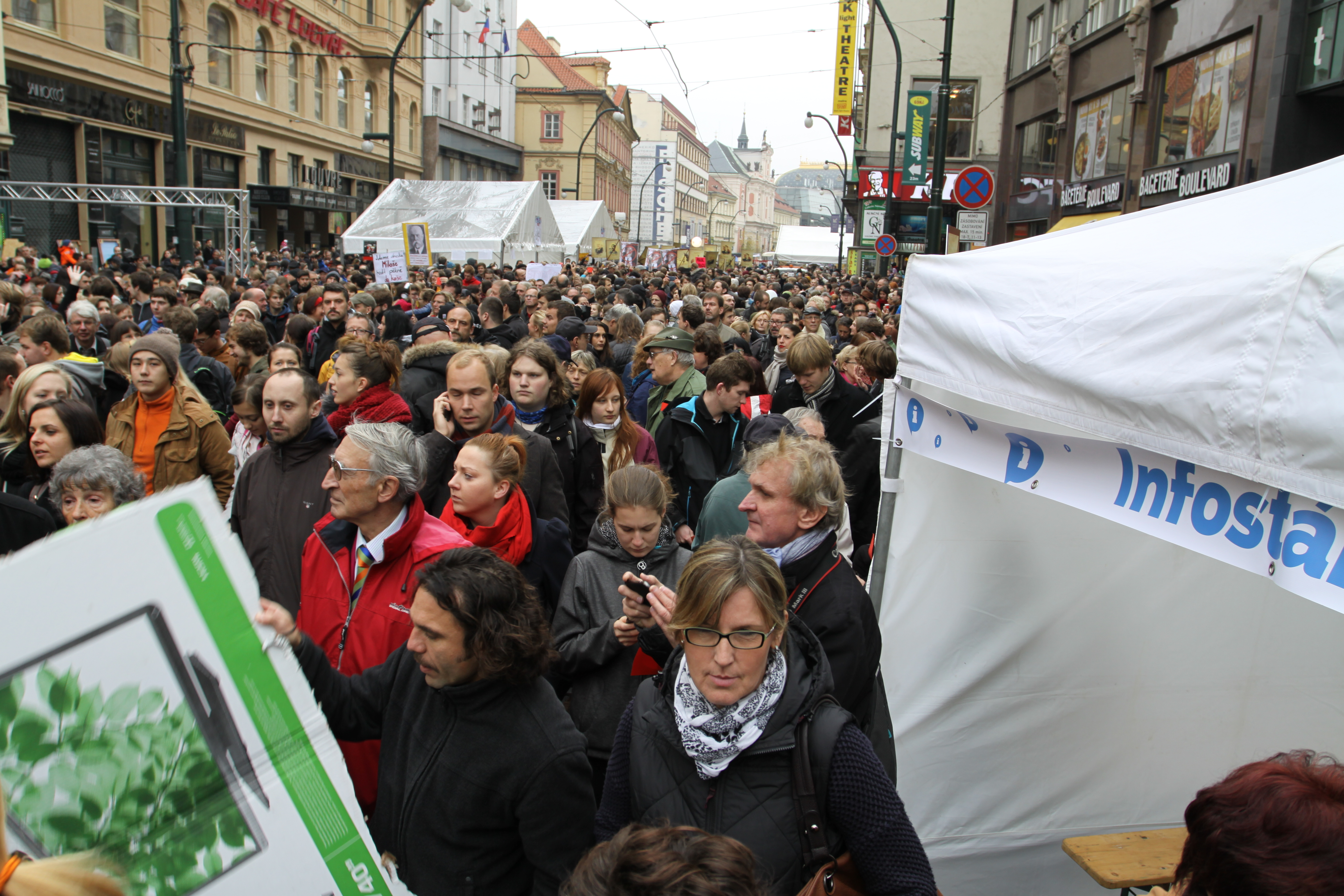
Národní street is a place where commemorative events and demonstrations associated with Velvet revolution are often held. This image is from a demonstration against Miloš Zeman during the 25th anniversary of the Velvet revolution.

Národní (commonly known as Národní třída, "National Avenue") is a major street in central Prague, Czech Republic. It runs between Jungmann Square and Legion Bridge on the Vltava, along the boundary of the Old Town and New Town. Developed on the site of Prague's former fortifications, the street became an important cultural and commercial boulevard during the 19th century.

Národní is home to several prominent institutions and buildings, including the National Theatre and the headquarters of the Czech Academy of Sciences. It is also closely associated with the Velvet Revolution: on 17 November 1989, riot police violently dispersed a student demonstration on the street, helping to trigger the protests that ended communist rule in Czechoslovakia.

== History ==
The street, then Ferdinand Avenue, decorated for a visit of the emperor, photo by Rudolf Bruner-Dvořák

Národní follows the line of the former fortifications and moat between Prague's Old Town and New Town. The present street began to develop after 1781, when the moat was filled in and trees were planted along the route. The western part was later called U Řetězového mostu, after the chain bridge across the Vltava.

During the 19th century, the street developed into one of Prague's major boulevards. New representative buildings included the Czech Savings Bank (Spořitelna česká) headquarters, designed by Ignác Vojtěch Ullmann and completed in 1863, which later became the headquarters of the Czech Academy of Sciences. In 1870, the street was renamed Ferdinandská.

The construction of the National Theatre strengthened the street's role as a centre of Czech cultural life. The theatre opened in 1881, was damaged by fire shortly afterwards, and reopened in 1883 following reconstruction. After the establishment of Czechoslovakia, the street was renamed Národní in 1919.

On 17 November 1989, a student demonstration moving towards central Prague was stopped on Národní třída and violently dispersed by riot police. The crackdown caused widespread public outrage and helped trigger the Velvet Revolution, which brought an end to communist rule in Czechoslovakia.

== Notable buildings and institutions ==
At the western end of Národní stands the National Theatre, one of the principal institutions of Czech culture and one of Prague's best-known landmarks. Opposite the National Theatre is Lažanský Palace, a Neo-Renaissance building designed by Ignác Vojtěch Ullmann and built between 1861 and 1863. The palace now serves as the main building of the Film and TV School (FAMU) and is also home to Café Slavia. Composer Bedřich Smetana lived and worked in the building during the 1860s.

The headquarters of the Czech Academy of Sciences are located nearby in a Neo-Renaissance building. Other notable buildings include Topič House, with an Art Nouveau façade designed by Osvald Polívka, and Adria Palace, built in the 1920s.

Later additions to the street include the Máj department store, designed in the 1970s by architects from the SIAL studio, and the New Stage of the National Theatre. Completed in 1983 to a design by Karel Prager, the New Stage is known for its distinctive glass façade.

== 17 November 1989 ==
On 17 November 1989, students gathered at Albertov to commemorate Jan Opletal and the Nazi repression of Czech universities in 1939. After the official demonstration ended, thousands of participants continued towards central Prague, calling for political change.

On Národní třída, the procession was blocked by security forces. Riot police surrounded the demonstrators and violently dispersed the crowd, injuring dozens of people.

The crackdown caused widespread public outrage and became a catalyst for the Velvet Revolution. Student and theatre strikes followed, Civic Forum was established two days later, and mass demonstrations spread across Czechoslovakia. A memorial on Národní commemorates the events of 17 November.

== See also ==
- Národní třída (metro station)
