= Škrdlovice =

- Municipality
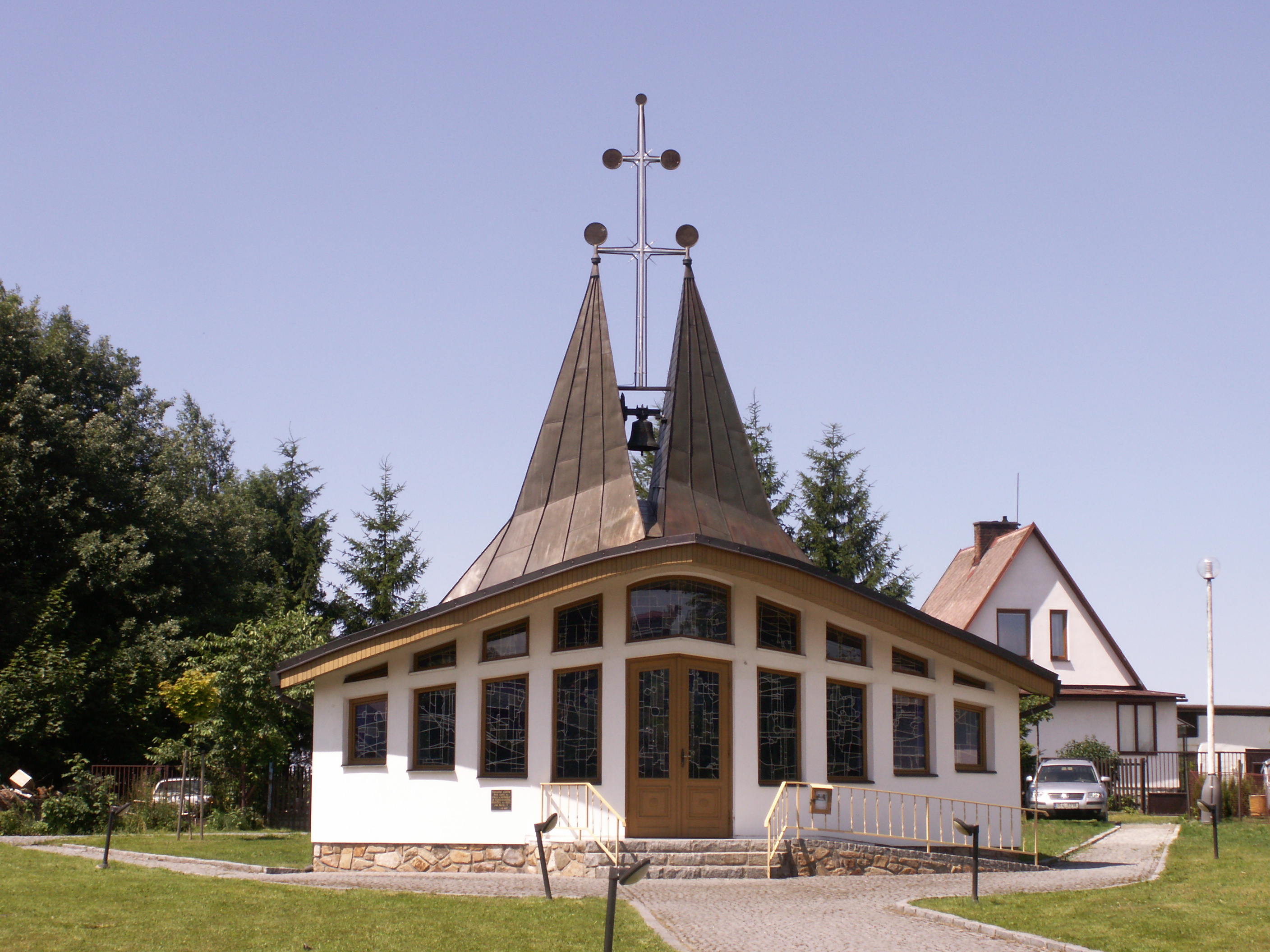
- Chapel of Saints Cyril and Methodius

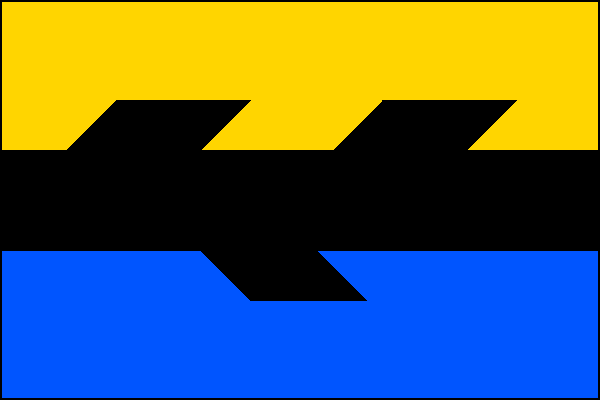
- Flag Coat of arms

- Location in the Czech Republic
- Coordinates: 49°38′5″N 15°55′34″E
- Country: Czech Republic
- Region: Vysočina
- District: Žďár nad Sázavou
- First mentioned: 1454

Area
  - Total: 5.76 km^{2} (2.22 sq mi)
- Elevation: 645 m (2,116 ft)

Population (2026-01-01)
  - Total: 711
  - Density: 123/km^{2} (320/sq mi)
- Time zone: UTC+1 (CET)
  - Summer (DST): UTC+2 (CEST)
- Postal code: 592 21
- Website: www.skrdlovice.cz

Škrdlovice is a municipality and village in Žďár nad Sázavou District in the Vysočina Region of the Czech Republic. It has about 700 inhabitants.

Škrdlovice lies approximately 8 kilometres (5 mi) north of Žďár nad Sázavou, 37 kilometres (23 mi) north-east of Jihlava, and 120 kilometres (75 mi) south-east of Prague.

== Demographics ==
Historical population
Year	Pop.	±%
1869	834	—
1880	851	+2.0%
1890	778	−8.6%
1900	762	−2.1%
1910	753	−1.2%
1921	704	−6.5%
1930	664	−5.7%
1950	558	−16.0%
1961	607	+8.8%
1970	559	−7.9%
1980	570	+2.0%
1991	574	+0.7%
2001	579	+0.9%
2011	624	+7.8%
2021	670	+7.4%
Source: Censuses
