= Věra Janoušková =

Czech sculptor, collagist, painter and graphic artist

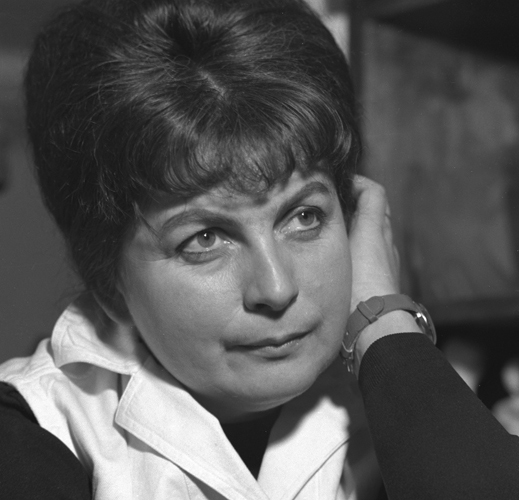
- Věra Janoušková in the 1960s
- Born: 25 June 1922; Úbislavice, Czechoslovakia
- Died: 10 August 2010 (aged 88); Prague, Czech Republic
- Education: Academy of Applied Arts
- Occupations: sculptor, draughtsman, printmaker, collagist
- Movement: UB 12, New Group, Umělecká beseda
- Spouse: Vladimír Janoušek
- Patrons: founder of the Foundation of Věra and Vladimír Janoušek

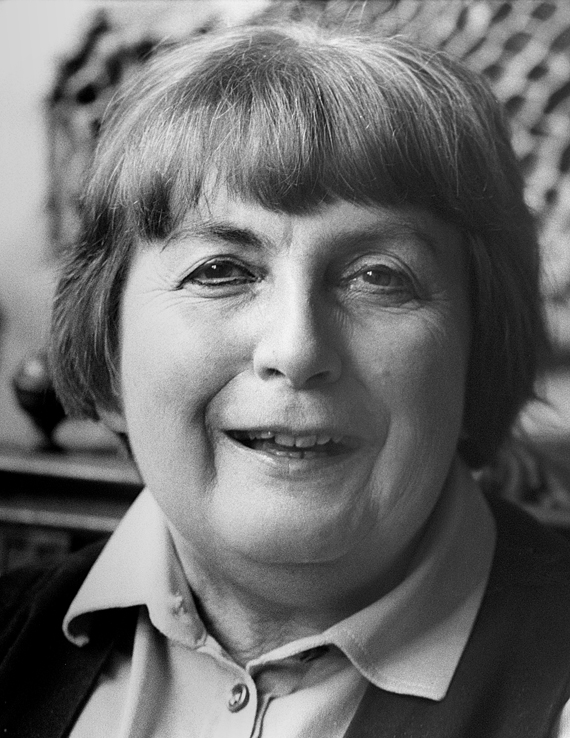
Věra Janoušková, foto Hana Hamplová

Věra Janoušková, née Havlová (25 June 1922 – 10 August 2010) was a Czech sculptor, collagist, painter and graphic artist. She was the wife of sculptor Vladimír Janoušek. In the 1960s, her sculptures made of enamel were among the highlights of Czech modern art and she is deservedly listed in Hazan's Nouveau dictionnaire de la sculpture moderne (Paris, 1970). After the occupation of Czechoslovakia by Soviet troops in August 1968, both Věra and Vladimír Janoušek lost the opportunity to exhibit and worked in seclusion. After the fall of communism in Czechoslovakia, Věra Janoušková had a retrospective exhibition at the National Gallery in Prague. In 2004, she founded the Věra and Vladimír Janoušek Foundation and bequeathed the entire estate of the couple to Museum Kampa – Jan and Meda Mládek Foundation.

== Life ==
Věra Janoušková (née Havlová) was born on 25 June 1922 in Úbislavice, in the family of a country schoolteacher as the youngest of three sisters. On the recommendation of her teacher, who discovered her talent for drawing, she took exams at the School of Applied Arts in Prague (UPŠ) for the study of painting, and although she failed the first time, the atmosphere of the school influenced her decision to devote herself to art. After a year's practice at the Vocational School of Stone-Sculpture in nearby Hořice, where she attended courses in art theory and had the opportunity to draw and model in clay (prof. Plichta), she was accepted in 1942 at the School of Applied Arts (UPŠ) to the sculpture studio of prof. Karel Dvořák.

After the war in 1945 she moved to the studio of Prof. Josef Wagner, where her classmates were Eva Kmentová, Alina Szapocznikow, Olbram Zoubek, Miloslav Chlupáč, Zdeněk Palcr, Vladimír Janoušek, Eugenie Jungová, Antonín Brejník and Vítězslav Jungbauer. During the Nazi Occupation, the School of Applied Arts substituted the closed Academy of Fine Arts and therefore in 1945 it gained the status of a second art college (Academy of Applied Arts in Prague). Among the professors who taught there were Václav Nebeský, Emil Filla, František Tichý, Josef Kaplický, Jan Bauch and Jan Lauda. At school and at post-war Prague exhibitions, students had the opportunity to get acquainted with modern European art. Janoušková absorbed various influences from structural abstraction to pop art, but the closest to her sensibility were the sculptural works of Gutfreund, Picasso, Moore or the works of Dubuffet.

After the war, she negotiated the possibility of studying at the École nationale supérieure des beaux-arts with the then best French sculptor-portraitist Marcel Gimond (a pupil of Rodin and Maillol), but the communist coup of 1948 ruined this opportunity. In 1948, Věra Havlová married Vladimir Janoušek and together with him went on a one-year scholarship to the Academy of Fine Arts in Sofia. In the 1950s, the Janoušek couple worked in a barn in Dolní Kalná at Vladimír parents' house. They acquired their first Prague studio in a workshop with an adjoining yard in the former Smíchov prison in Malátova Street. It became a place of meetings and exchanges of opinions of their generational comrades and younger artists. Věra was friends with Adriena Šimotová. In 1951–1959 Věra Janoušková participated in the 1st–4th Czechoslovak Fine Arts Show and in 1958 in the Young Art Exhibition in Brno. At the turn of the 1950s and 1960s the social atmosphere relaxed somewhat. In 1962, the Janoušek couple, together with Zoubek and Kmentová, visited Constantin Brâncuși in Târgu Jiu. In addition to Romania, she also visited Paris (1959–1960), Italy (1967, 1969) and Egypt (1969).

In 1960, Věra Janoušková was a founding member of the UB 12 creative group and exhibited her sculptures at the first solo exhibition in Gallery on Charles Square. The first UB 12 exhibition in gallery of the then biggest publishing house Československý spisovatel in 1962 was closed three times in a row at the request of the Central City Committee in Prague, was criticised in the party press of the time and a fictional radio interview with an "outraged" visitor was published. This eventually led to unusually high attendance and awakened the interest of theorists – Jindřich Chalupecký and Miroslav Lamač. Věra Janoušková's sculptures made from found materials were cited by the party press as a particularly intimidating example. In 1965, she had her second solo exhibition at Václav Špála Gallery, which was run by Jindřich Chalupecký. In the 1960s, she was represented at important exhibitions of Czech art abroad (Budapest, 1960, Genoa, 1965, Liège, West Berlin, 1966, Turin, Middelheim-Antwerp, Expo 67 Montreal, 1967, Paris, 1968, Legnano, 1969, West Berlin, 1970).

In the second half of the 1960s, the Janoušek couple acquired a plot of land in Prague-Košíře, where they built their own sculpture studio according to the design of Vladimír Janoušek. The approval project of the functionalist building was created by the office Hrubý, Cubr, Pokorný (authors of the award-winning Czechoslovak Pavilion at the Expo 58 in Brussels) and later modified by arch. Alena Šrámková. After a very fruitful period in the 1960s, when the Janoušek couple presented their work both at home and abroad, the soviet occupation in August 1968, followed by two decades of harsh "normalization", was a disaster for both of them. Opportunities to exhibit were rare and held only in unofficial spaces or far outside Prague, public commissions were non-existent, foreign contacts were broken. No official gallery in a larger city was allowed to hold an exhibition for Věra Janoušková's 60th birthday, and in the end it was held in the modest premises of the theatre in Český Těšín.

Neither Věra nor Vladimír Janoušek did consider emigration because of their grandparents. Finally, the strong attachment to the country and the friendly environment within the community of artists similarly driven into involuntary isolation prevailed. The Janoušek couple worked alternately in studios in Prague-Košíře and in Vidonice near Pecka. In 1986, Vladimír Janoušek died and Věra experienced another long personal crisis. At that time she mainly created collages and sporadically sculptures with a strong existential accent. In the 1980s, Věra Janoušková participated in the creation of the unofficial anthology "Grey Brick" (published by the Jazz Section, ed. Karel Srp Jr.) and became a member of the New Group of artists (1987).

After the fall of communism in 1989, the work of both spouses could again be introduced to the wider public. Věra Janoušková gained a firm place in the context of modern Czech sculpture, with retrospective exhibitions of her sculptures and collages taking place at National Gallery in Prague, Gallery of Art in Karlovy Vary, North Bohemian Gallery in Litoměřice, East Bohemian Gallery in Pardubice, Regional gallery of Highlands in Jihlava, Gallery of Modern Art in Hradec Králové, GuBJ in Klatovy, Stodola in Český Krumlov, Prague City Gallery, Mánes exhibition hall, Museum Kampa. She exhibits abroad (Europe, USA, Asia), is awarded honorary citizenship of Nová Paka, becomes a member of the renewed Umělecká beseda (1990). In 2004, she founded the Věra and Vladimír Janoušek Foundation and contributed to it with a significant collection of the artworks of both sculptors. The estate of both artists is currently administered by Museum Kampa – Jan and Meda Mládek Foundation.

Věra Janoušková died on 10 August 2010 in Prague at the age of 88.

== Work ==
One of Věra Janoušková's first creations, important in the context of her later work, was the figurative tapestry "Ulysses" (1948), sewn from scraps of fabric on an old blanket. The source of inspiration was ancient art and Roger Bissière's large-scale fabric collages, presented at the French Modern Art Exhibition in Prague (1947). "Ulysses" and the following "Self-Portrait with Sculpture" and "Pierrot and Columbine (1952–1954)" foreshadow later coloured paper collages and sculpture-collages assembled from coloured enamels.

Her sculptural sensibility was most influenced by Gutfreund, "New Objectivity (Neue Sachlichkeit)" and Naïve art, as well as later classical realism. Equally strong and stimulating was the introduction to the work of Picasso, Giacometti and Dubuffet, the Flemish Expressionists (Constant Permeke, Gustave De Smet), M. Marini, and Fritz Wotruba. Almost everything that establishes her distinctiveness is evident in her early sculptures – a strong feeling for volume, colour and material. Janoušková was a type of spontaneous and intuitive creator, incomprehensible to the layman and unclassifiable by art theorists. She ignored the contemporary tendencies of Czech Informel and New Figuration, and with the essentially constructive focus of her artistic activity, she brought back to life the rubbish found on the scrap heap, from which she created new entities. In this respect her composing of materiels as a creative sculptural principle is closest to Zbyněk Sekal, Karel Nepraš or Aleš Veselý.

Despite her rejection of profaned classical noble materials and her conscious effort to deny "beauty", her work achieves an unquestionable aesthetic quality. Janoušková negates the established criteria of usefulness and uselessness and finds value in something that others have already disavowed of any value, and beauty, where all find only decay, deterioration and destruction. Her personal preoccupation, which has the character of an "obsession with material", finds inspiration directly in the found object. It becomes a thematic moment and a starting point for improvisation. Janoušková eliminated in advance the randomness and indeterminacy of the combination of the found objects and by joining them she established their solid relationship and the confidence of a new reality. Although Janoušková belongs to the artists whose work is based on spontaneity, she is guided by an intellectual control that shapes the works and makes them clairvoyant.

The personal traumas of World War II and the Warsaw Pact invasion of Czechoslovakia by Soviet troops in August 1968, and the subsequent occupation and normalization spanning more than twenty years, provide an existential theme in her works, outwardly evident as an effort to suppress feelings of insecurity and fragmentation and to create a system that encompasses lived experience and offers the possibility of returning the world to its original integrity.

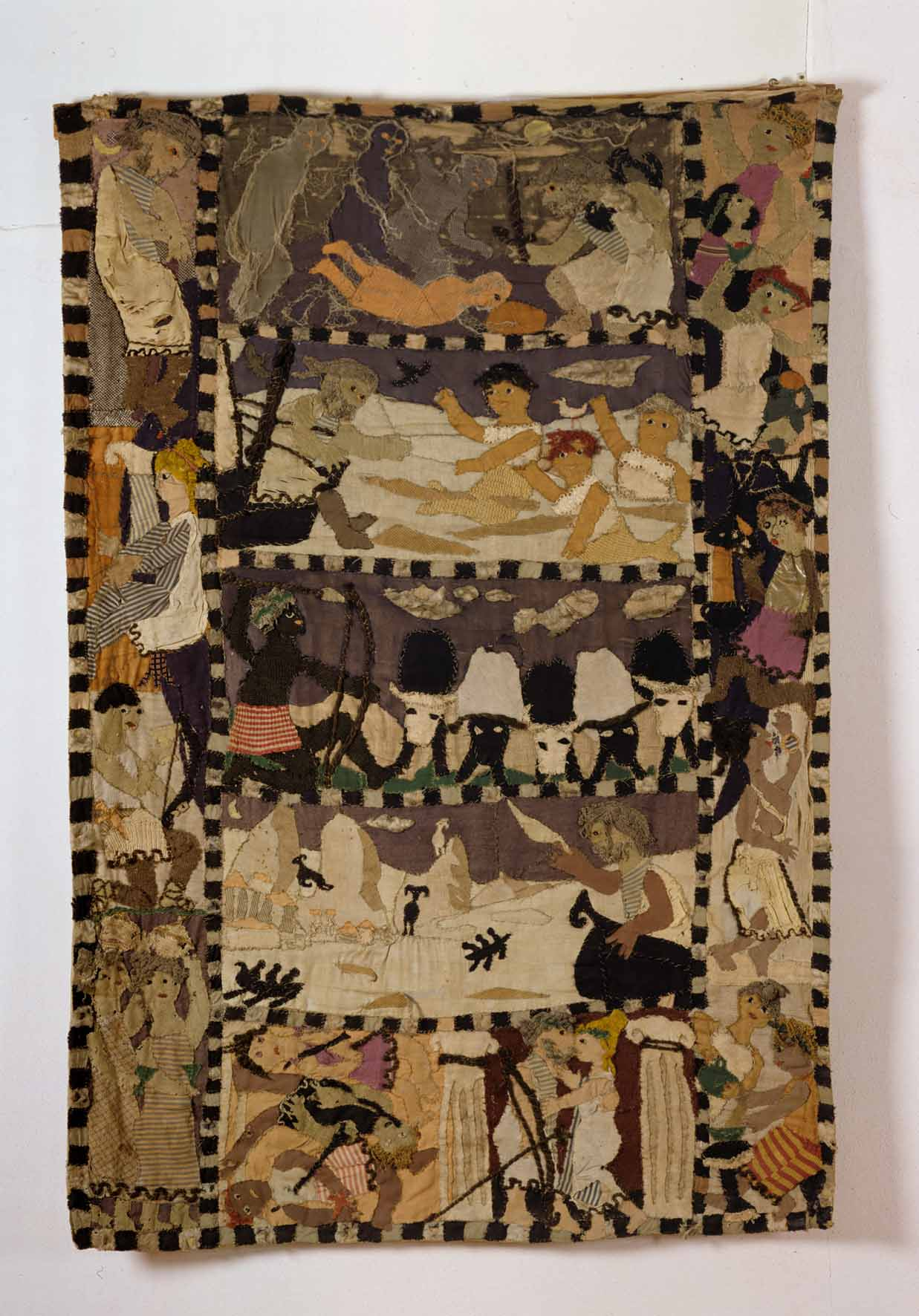
Ulysses (1948-1949), sewn collage,173 x120 cm

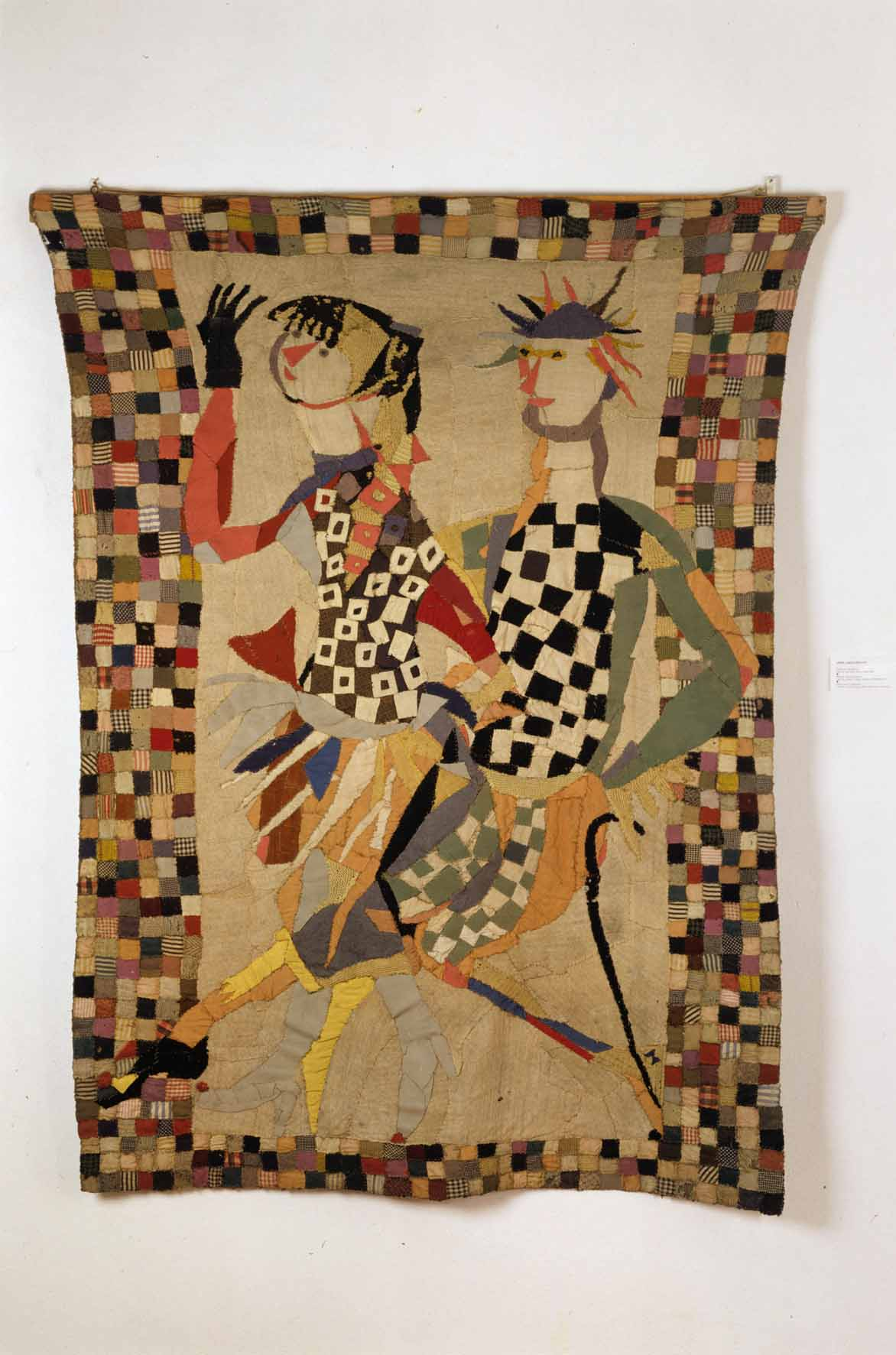
Pierrot and Columbine (1952-1954), sewn collage,160 x120 cm

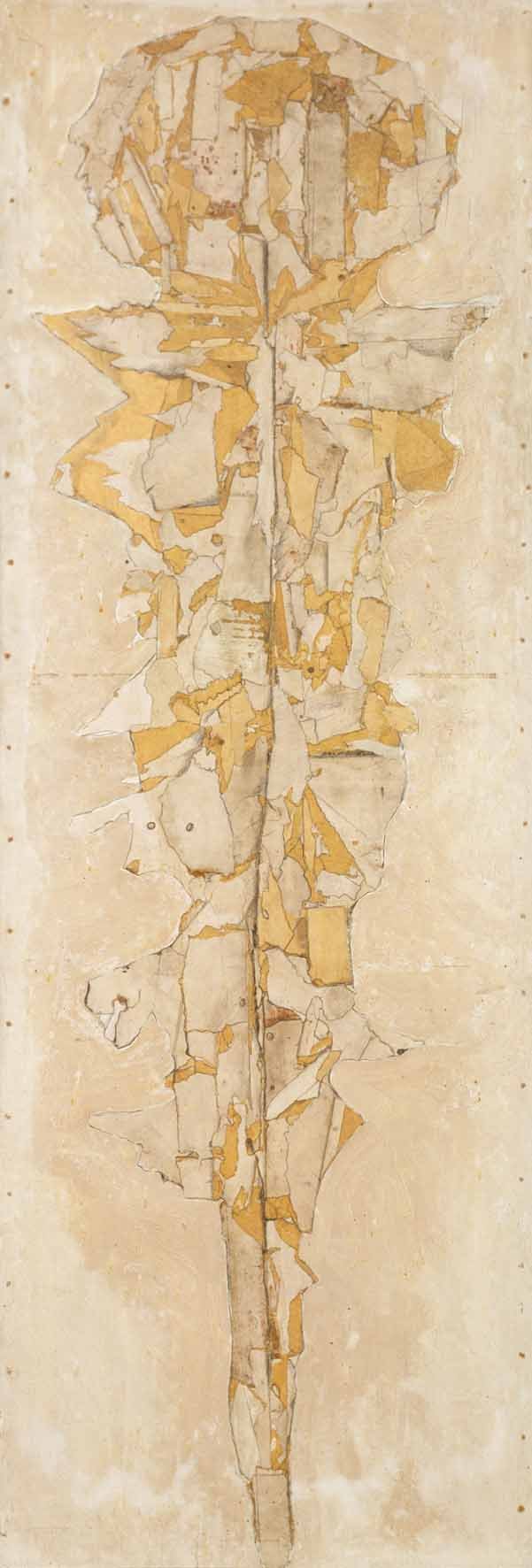
Figure (1950s), collage, silk, paper, drawing, h. around 200 cm

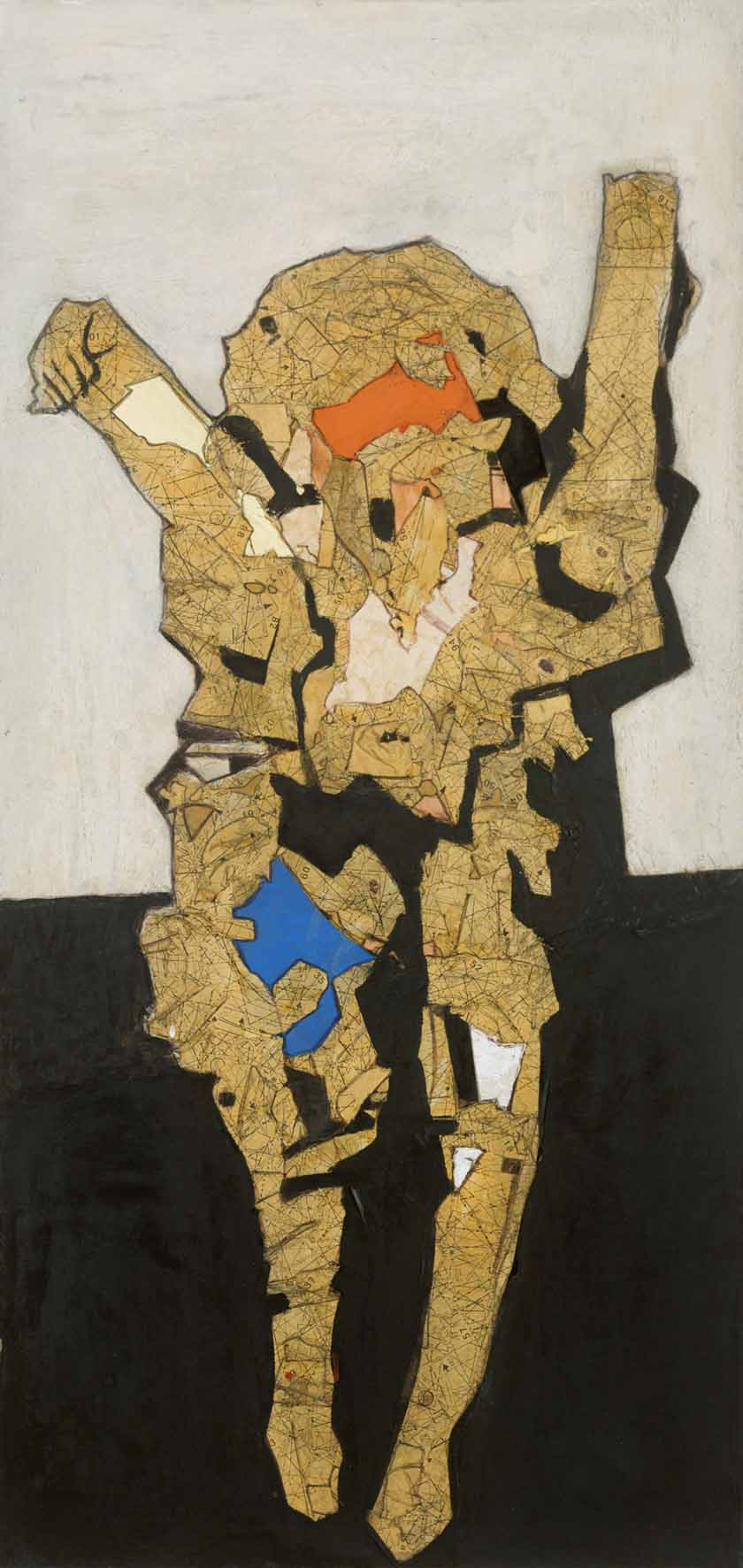
Silhouette (1959), mixed media,105 x 50 cm

=== Sculpture ===
Janoušková's sculpture Seated (1949) still refers in its poetic tone to her studies with Prof. Wagner, but by the late 1950s she was already creating figurative sculptures characterised by expressive modelling (Black Madonna, 1959). A radical departure from the traditionally understood figure and modelling became apparent at the very beginning of the 1960s (Black Totem, 1961, Crystalline Totem, 1962). Věra Janoušková's sculptures are characterised by an extremely stretched shape, material that is acknowledged and emphasised by a manual treatise, and a certain brutal vitality. Later, her sculptures were created by the method of assemblage from found objects, modelled with plaster or asbestos cement. At the turn of the 1950s and 1960s, Janoušková was also interested in the texture and colour of slag, which she used for a series of small figurative sculptures (Slag sculptures, 1962). These resemble Cycladic idols or Venus of Dolní Věstonice and were created by modelling real pieces of slag with plaster.

Věra Janoušková's early sculptural work from the first half of the 1960s is notable by her search for shape and expression, experimentation with different materials and their combination with each other, emphasizing sometimes volume, sometimes verticality. The surface is heavily textured or is an assemblage of found objects, and colour often plays a significant role (Coloured Figure, 1962, Seated Figure, 1962). Janoušková gradually abandons modelling and rather composes the sculptures from individual elements (Warriors, 1963).

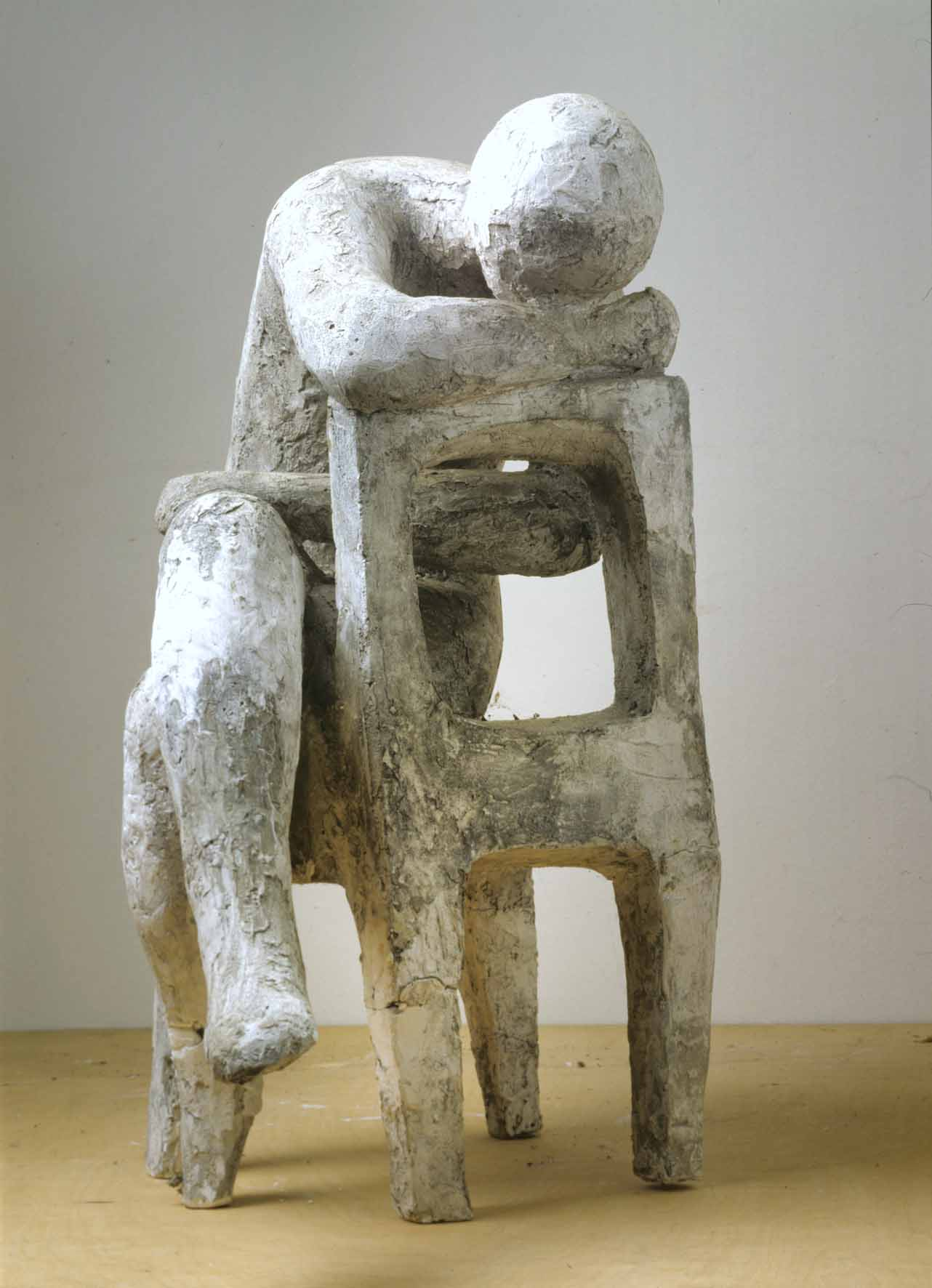
Seated (1949), h. 52 cm

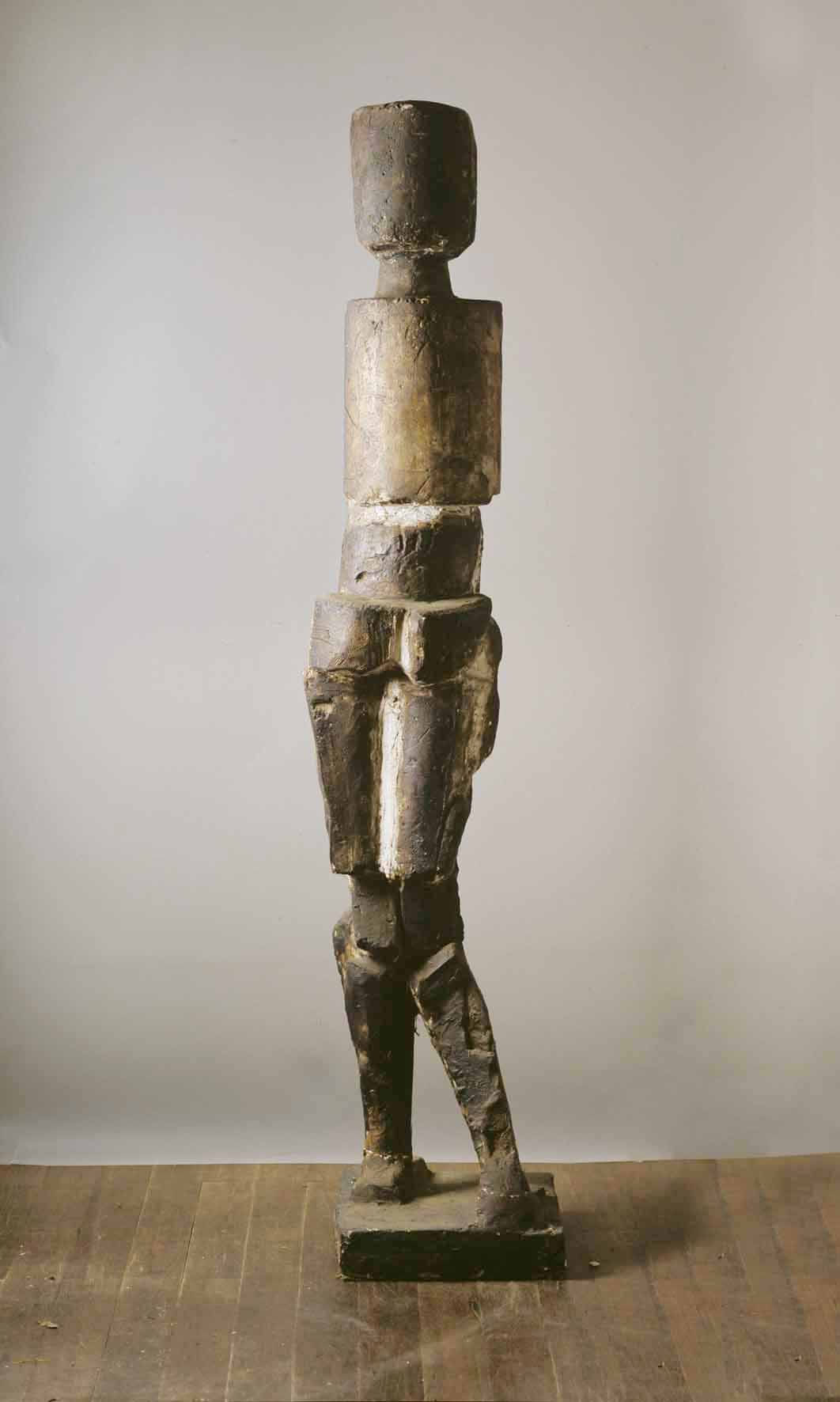
Figure composed of ceramic forms (1961), polychromed plaster, h.142 cm

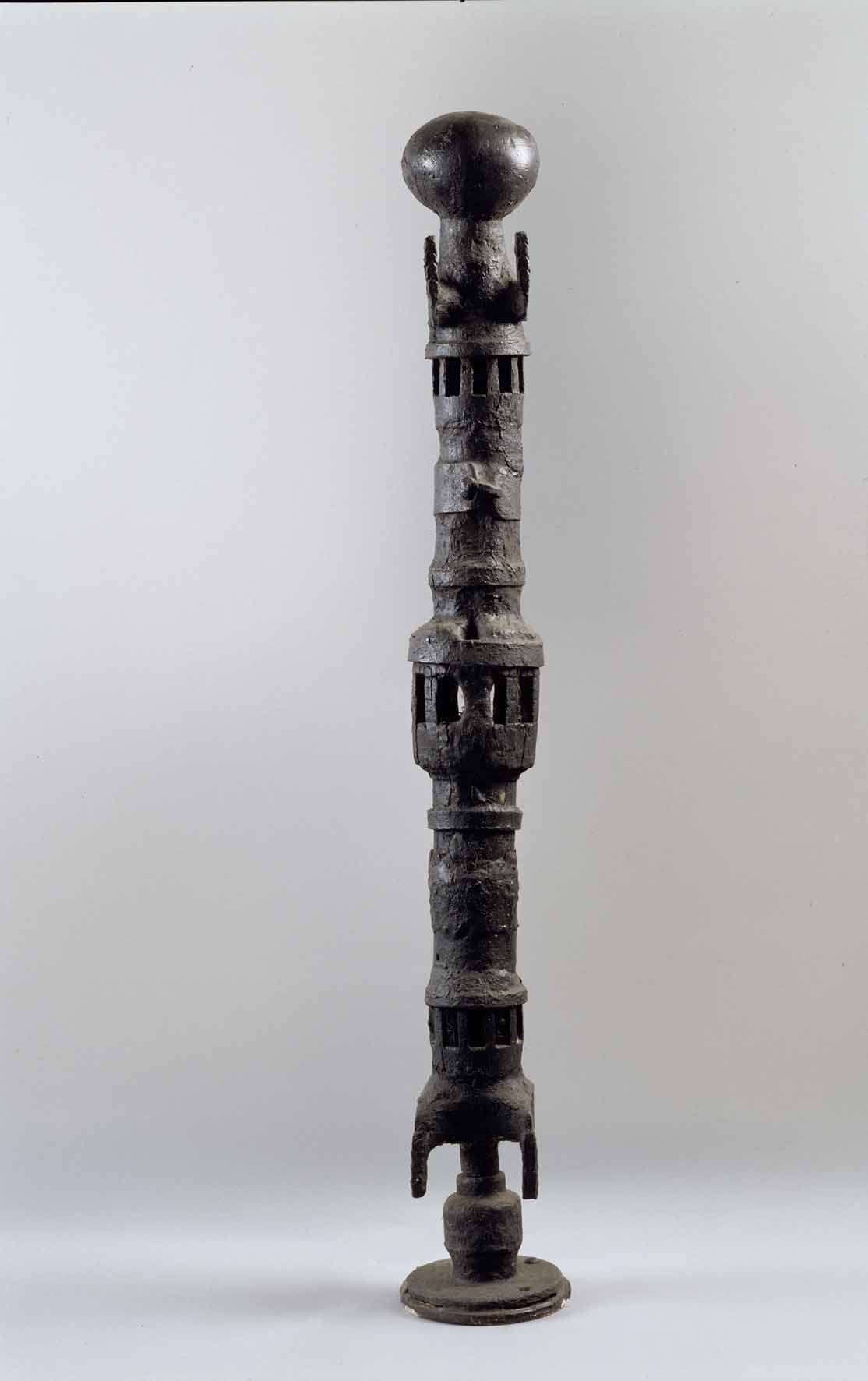
Black Totem (1961), mixed media, h. 106 cm

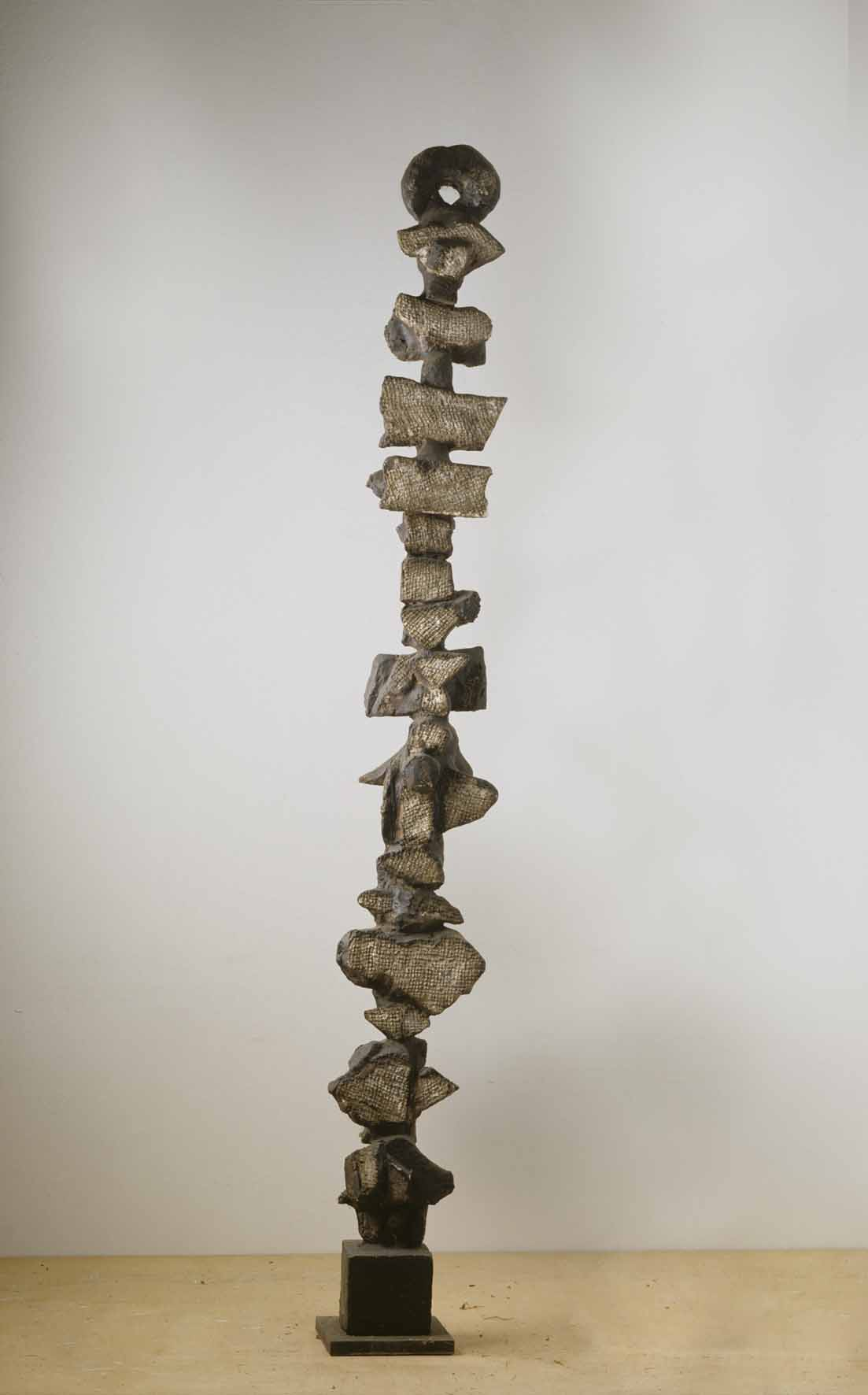
Crystal Totem (1962), polychrome plaster, h. 134 cm

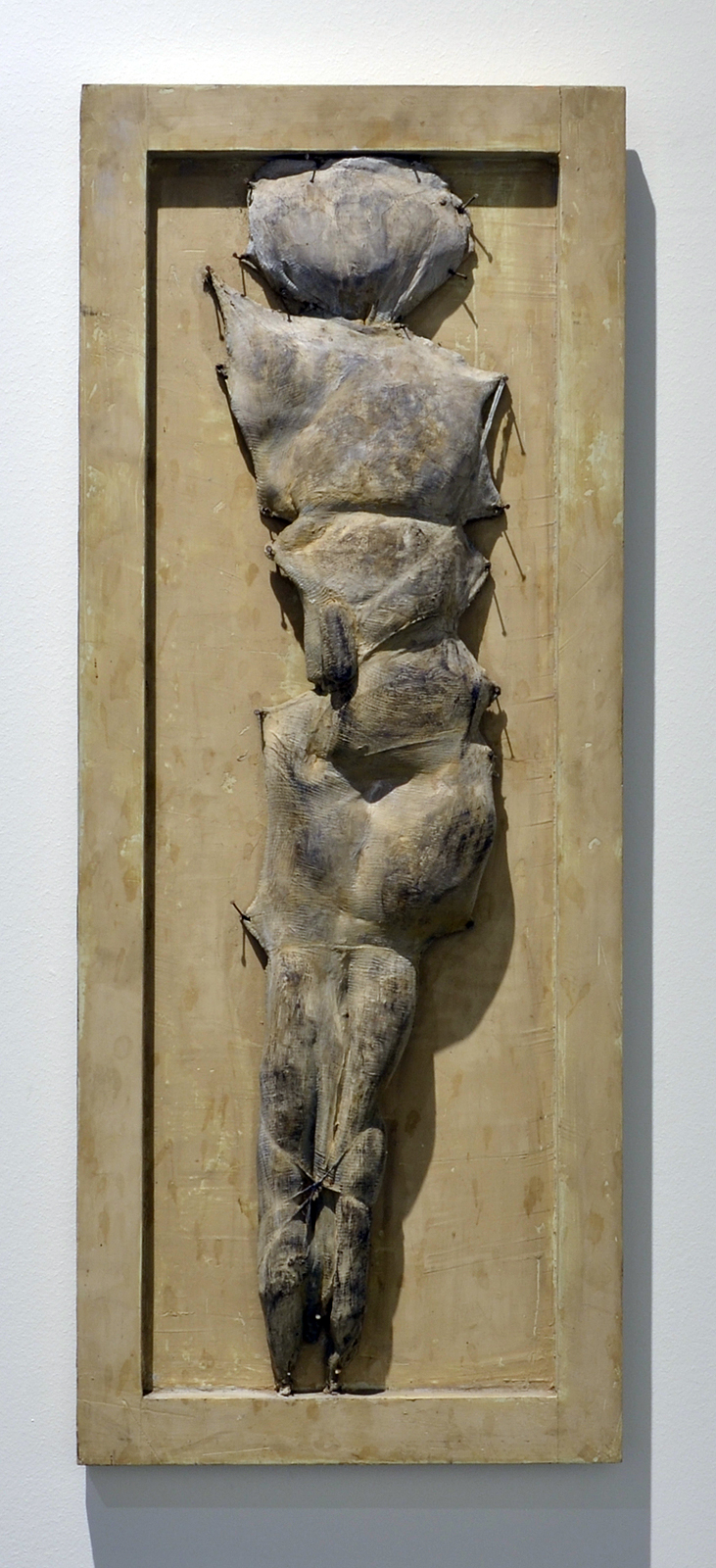
Stretched Figure (1961), Golden Goose Gallery

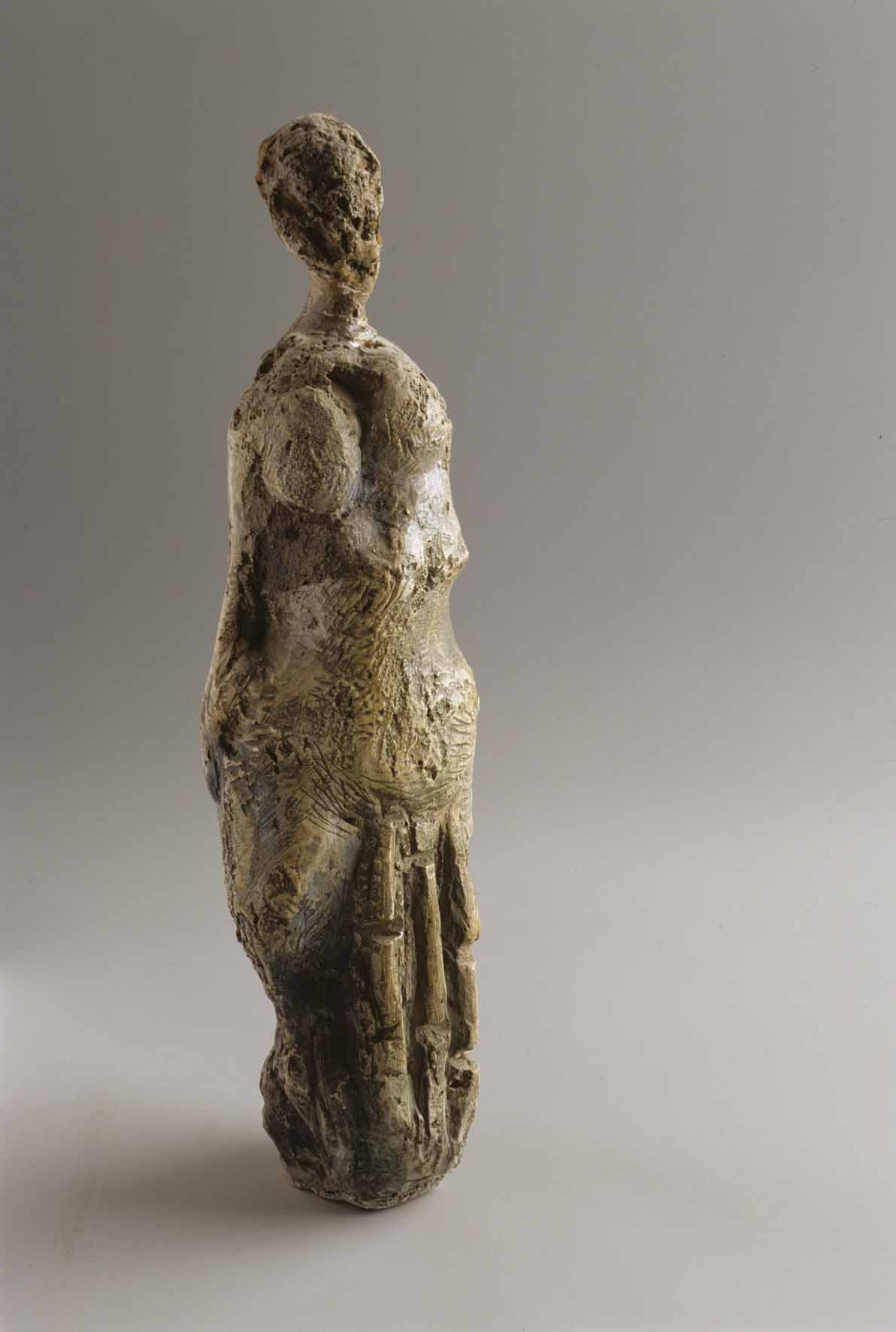
Slag sculpture, slag, plaster (1962), h. 23 cm

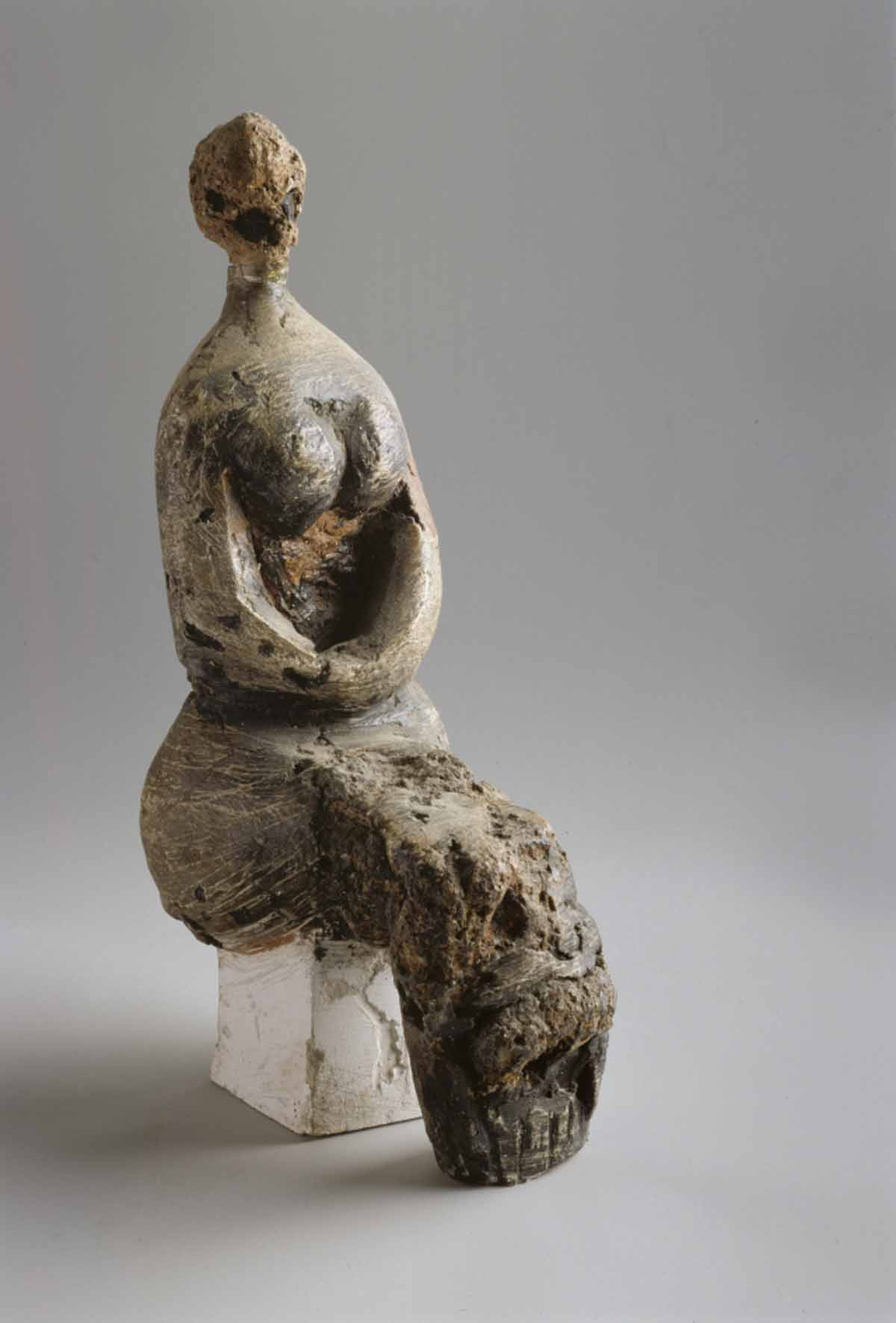
Slag sculpture III (1962), h. 20 cm

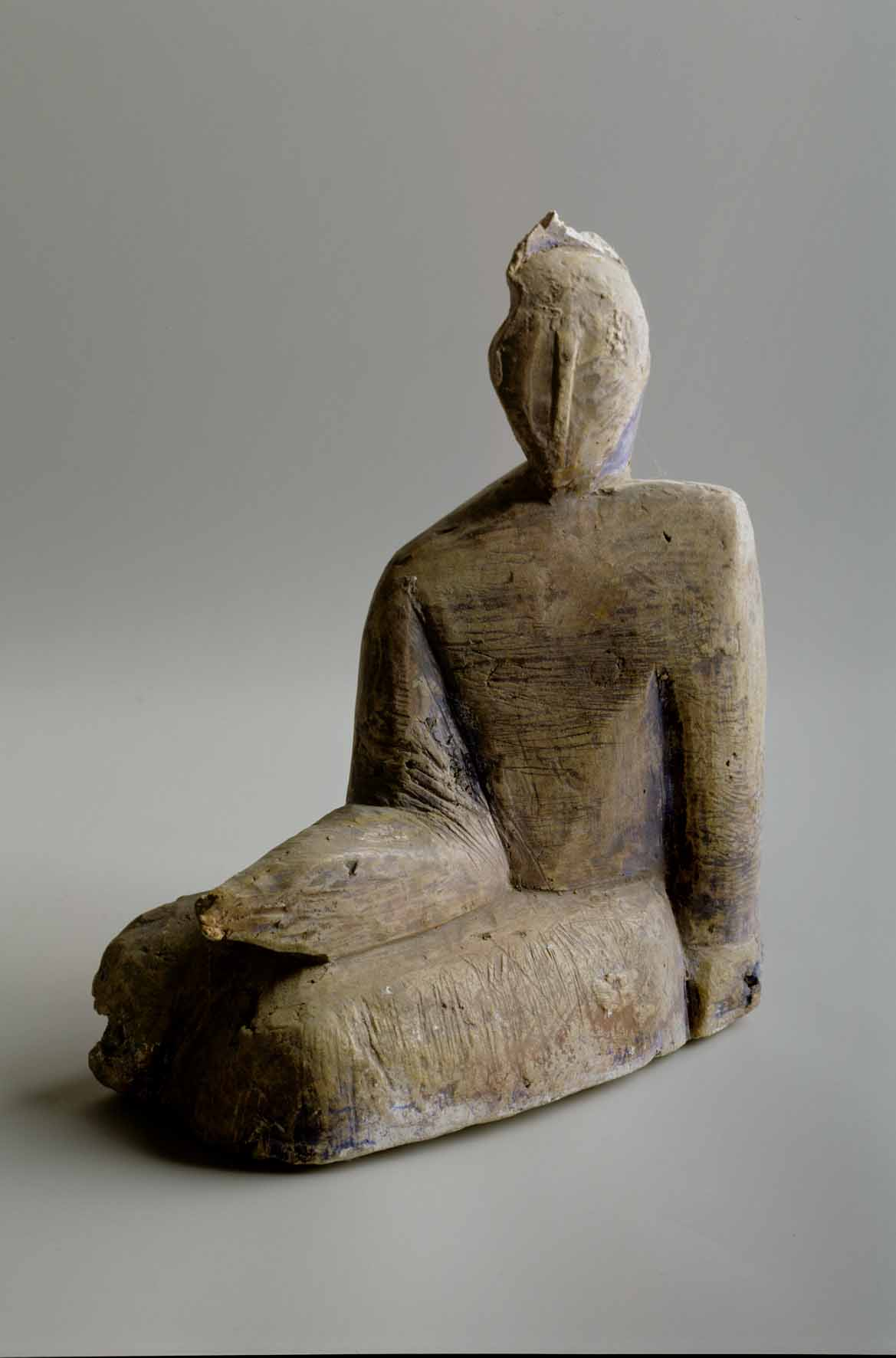
Slag sculpture, slag, plaster (1962), h. 20 cm

Already in the 1950s, Janoušková was attracted by the craftsmanship and handwork of iron objects, which she found during her stay in the countryside in Dolní Kalná and later used to construct stylized figures (Head, 1964). One line of her work in 1958–1965 are figurative flat plaster sculptures, often combined with iron and other materials, with a simple outline and a complex structural surface, which brought her closer to Jean Dubuffet and the "structuralists" – the creators of Informel (Head, 1961, Four-Legged, 1963). They are characterized by frontality, haptically and visually appealing surface and a special hieraticism and relationship to the figural archetype (Seated, 1962, Totem for Fr. Jezerský, 1963, The Couple, 1964, The Little idiot, 1965). The creative intention is supported by formal discipline and a clear conceptual idea. The figures can be understood as modern idols, endowed with a certain grotesqueness. At the same time, several fragile vertical figures composed of small elements were created, evoking a sense of precariousness and threat (Crystalline Totem, 1962, Figure composed of ceramic forms, 1961). The iron sculptures from 1964 to 1965 are a distinctive contribution to the iron sculpture of the time in a witty figurative abbreviation (Iron Figure Set, 1964–1965). The iron figures, sometimes combined with plaster, also represent a different position, which in their rustic character and brutality are reminiscent of totems (Figure II, 1962, Figure made of corrugated iron).

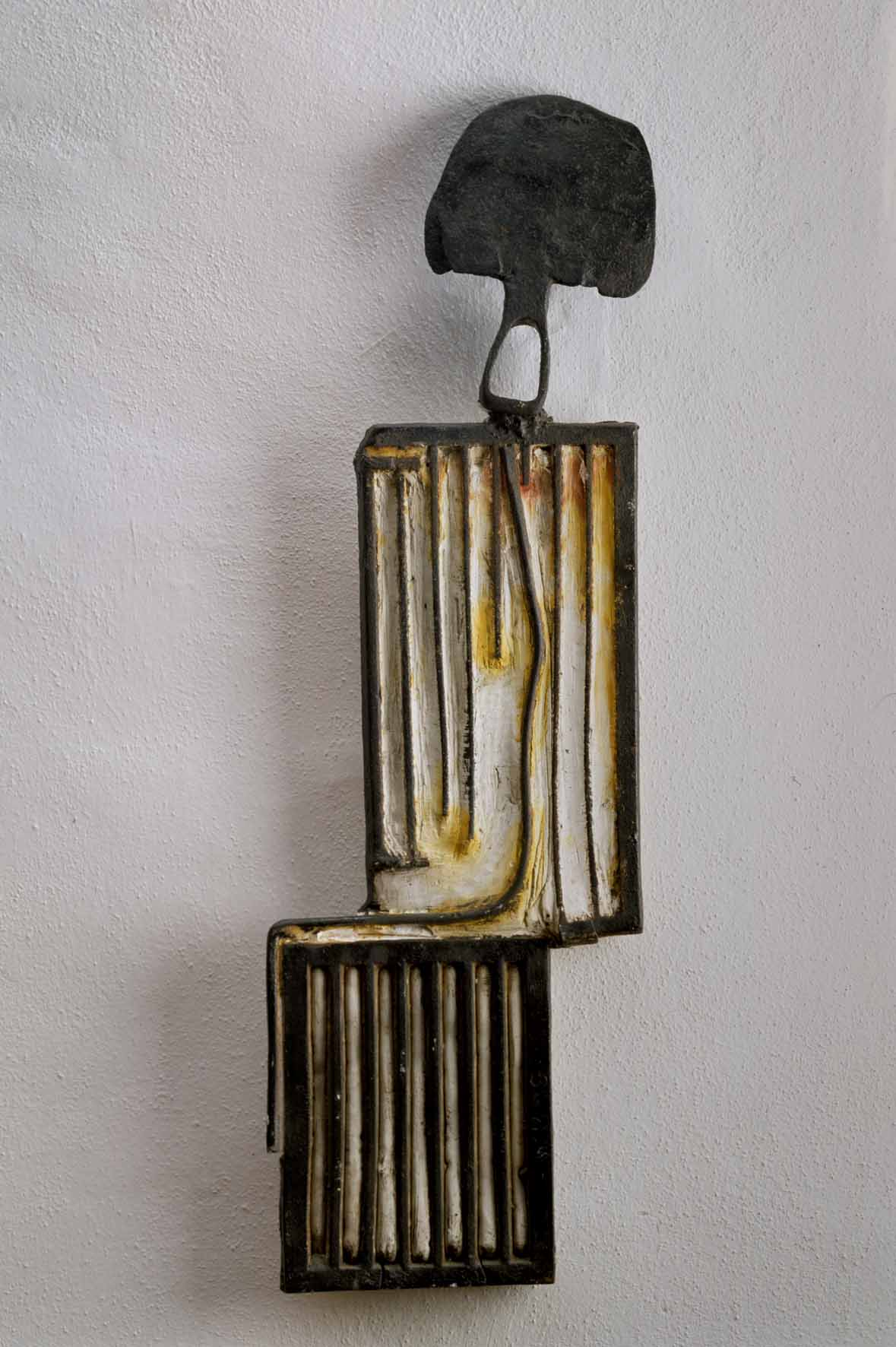
Seated (1962), iron, plaster, h. 71 cm

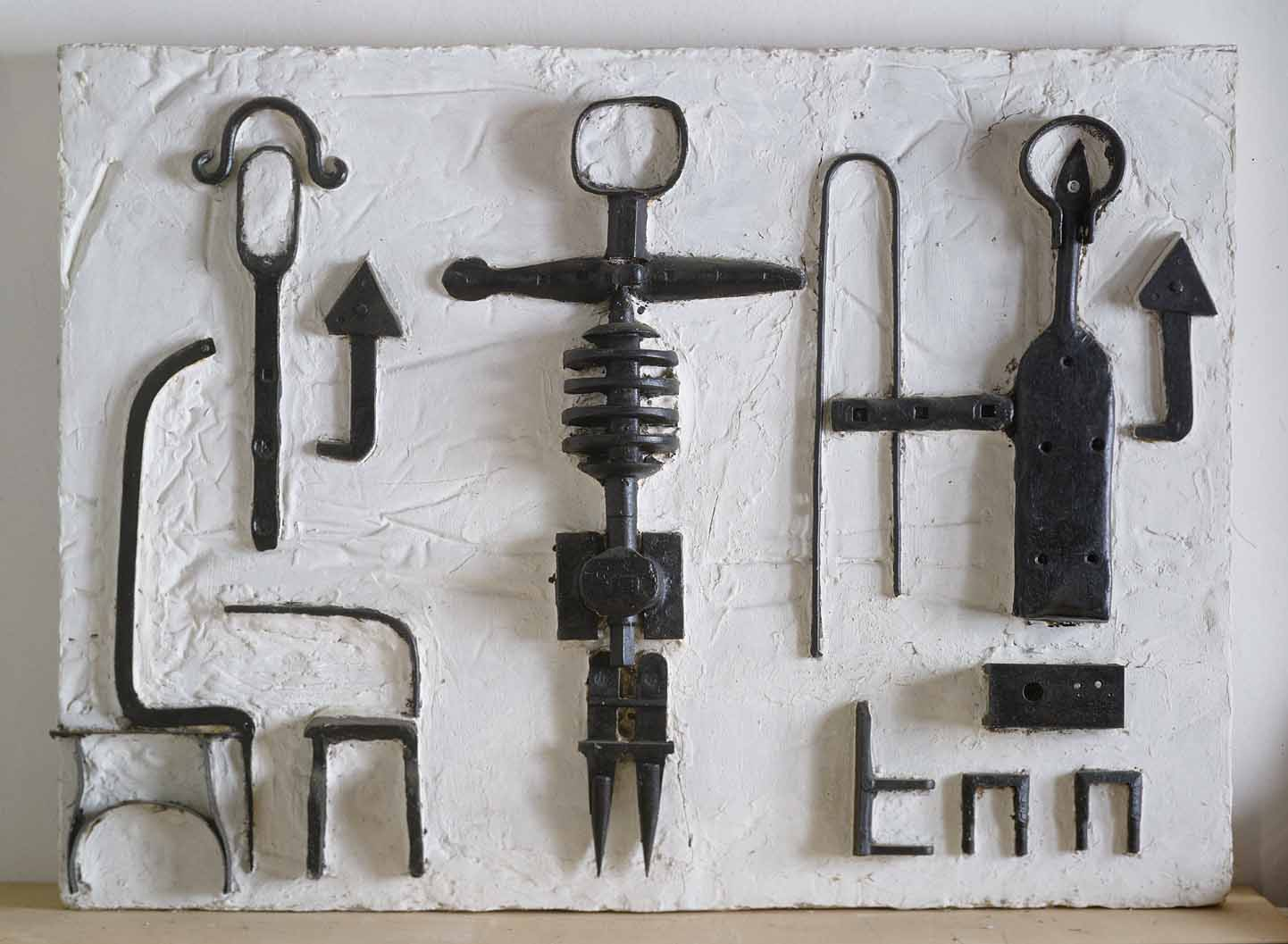
Warriors (1963), iron, plaster, h. 70 cm

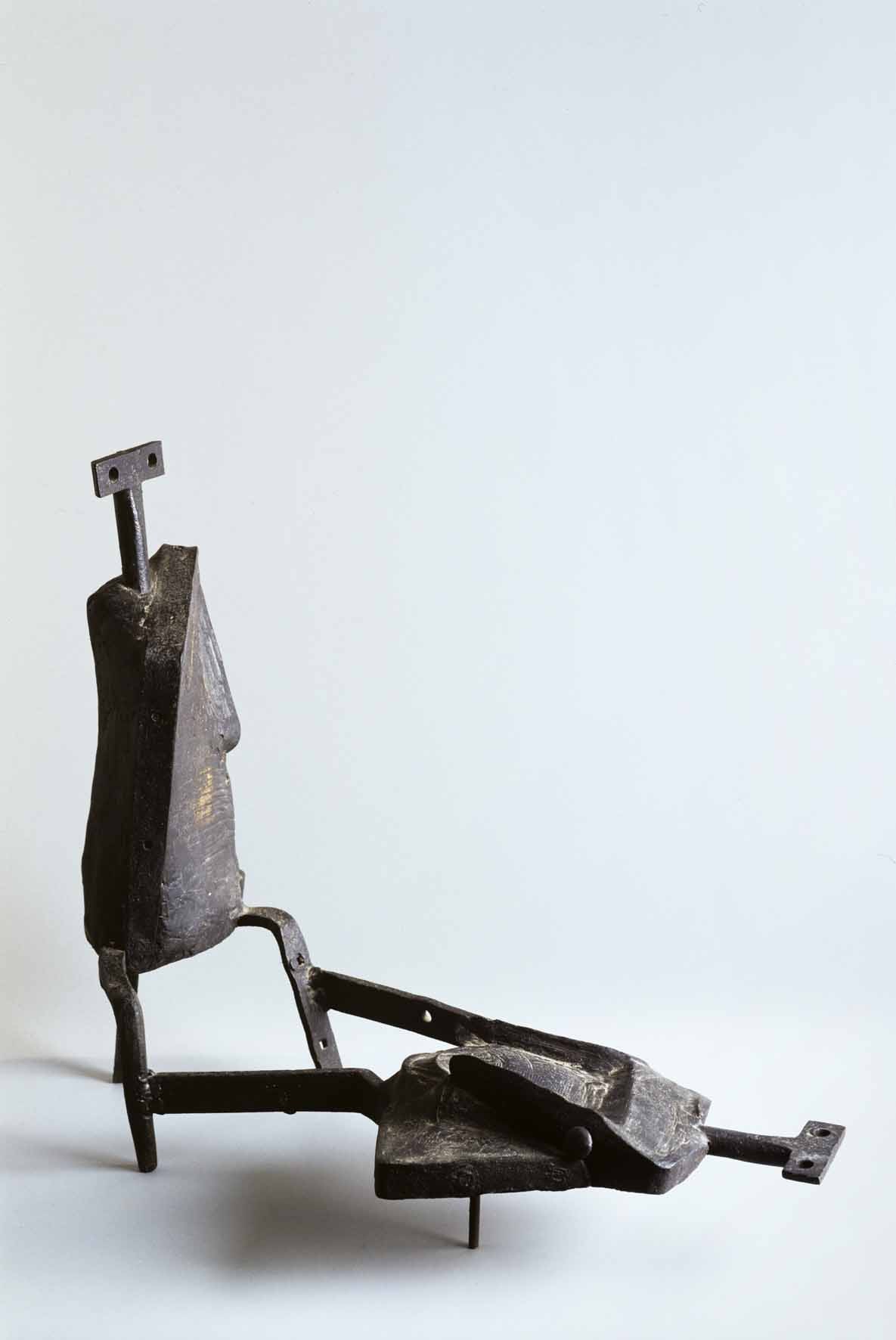
The Couple (1964), iron, plaster, h. 44 cm

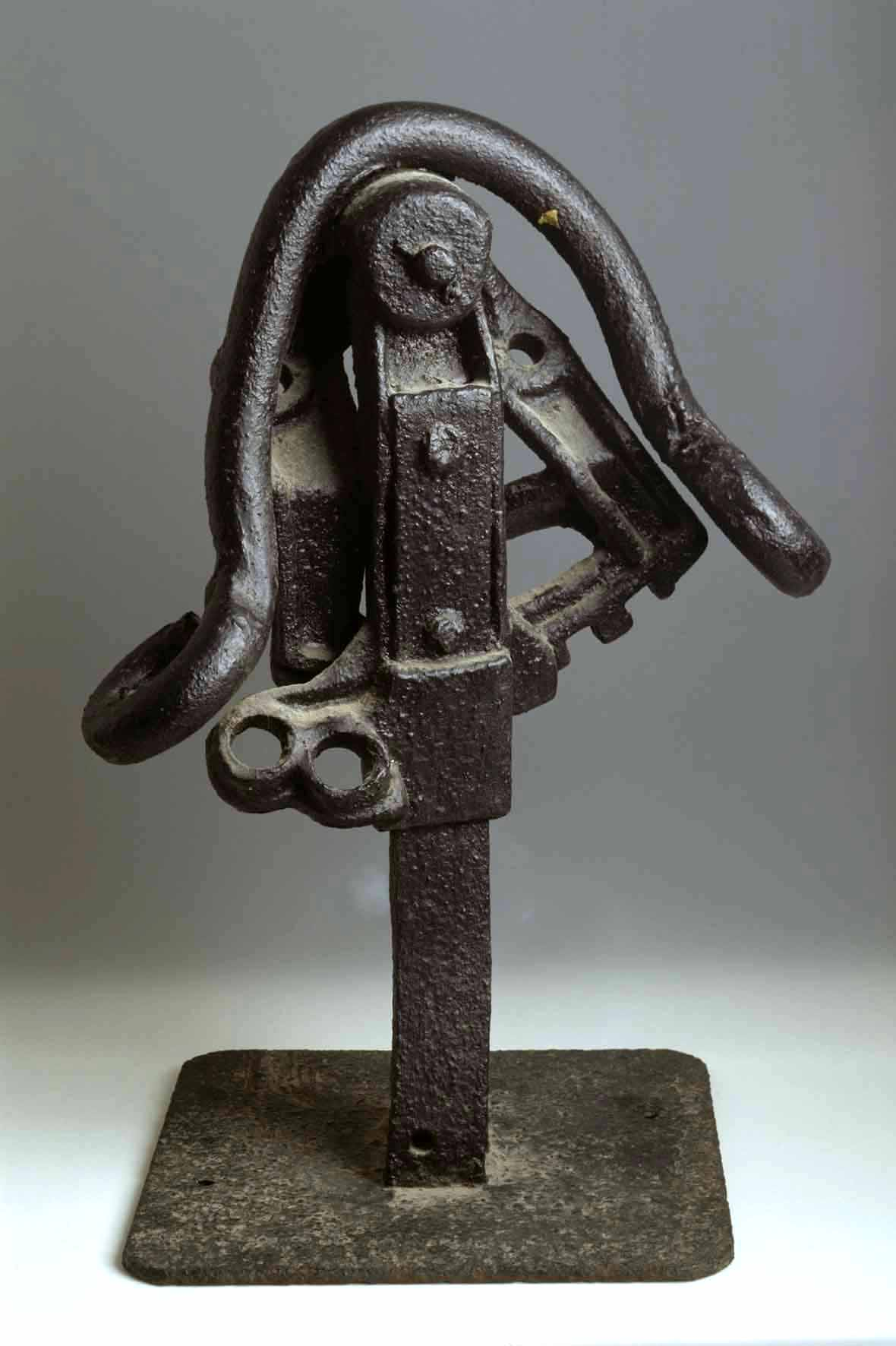
Head 3 (1964), iron, h. 35 cm

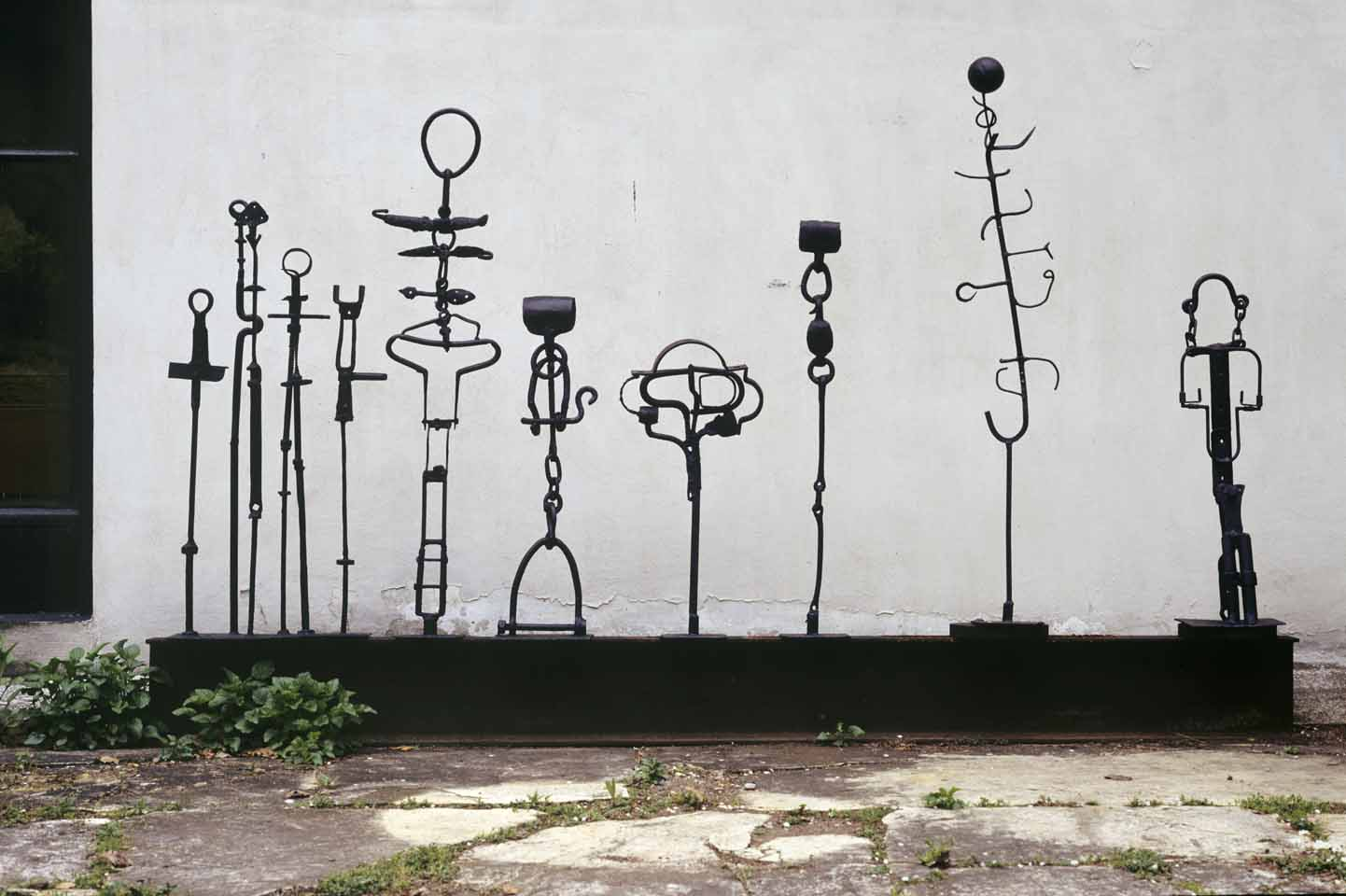
Set of iron figures (1964-1965)

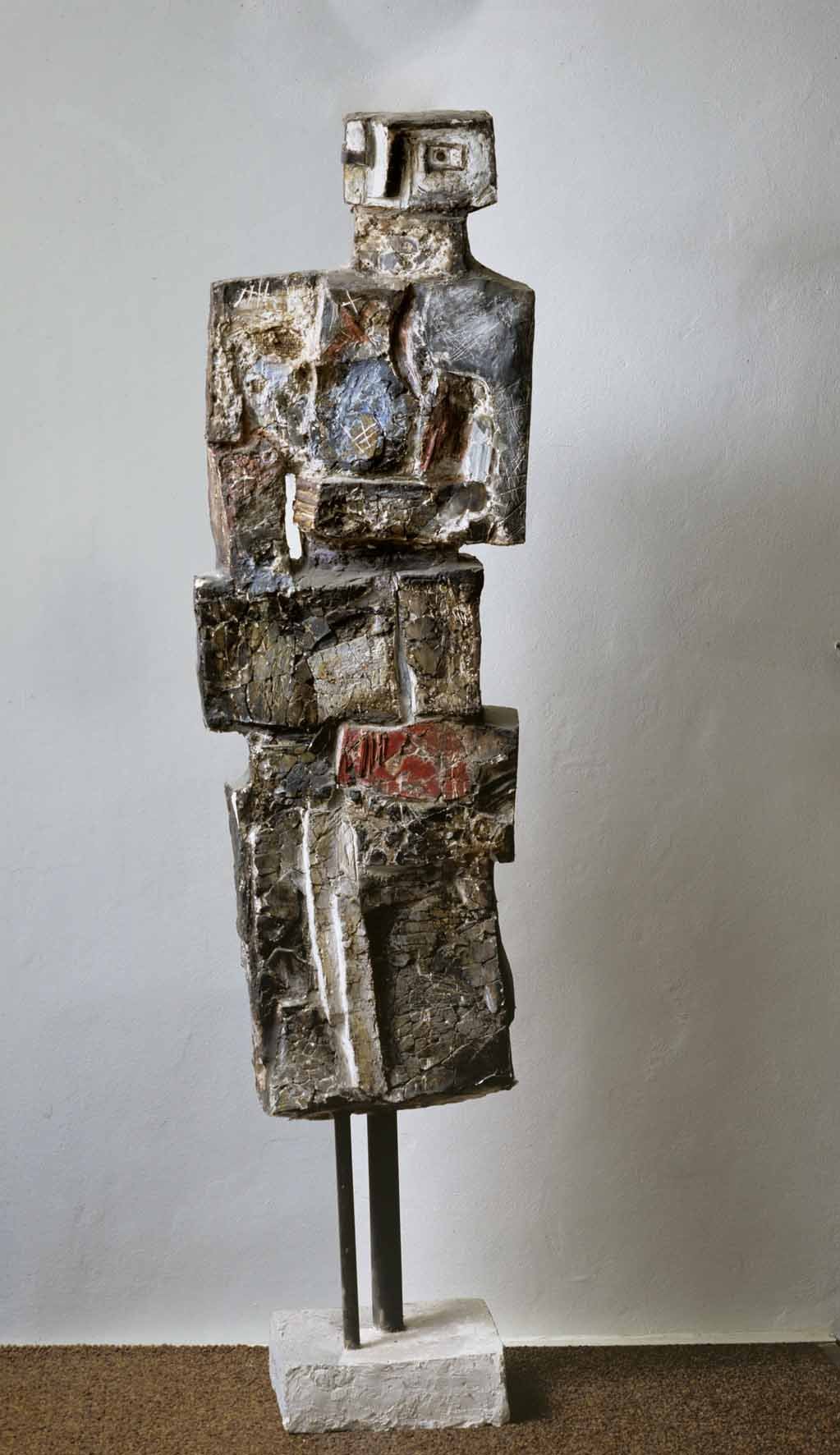
Coloured Figure (1962), h.187 cm

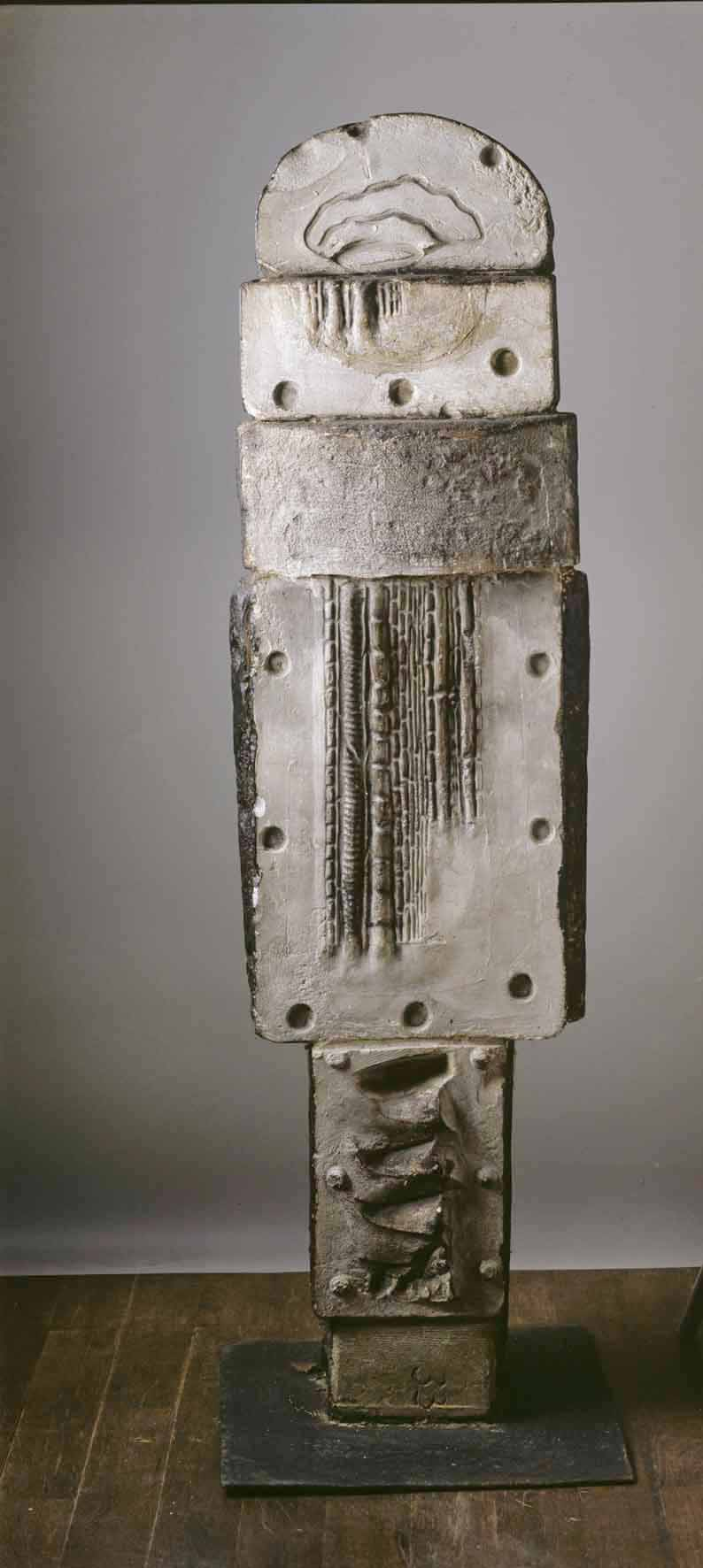
Totem for Fr. Jezerský (1963), iron, plaster, h. 117 cm

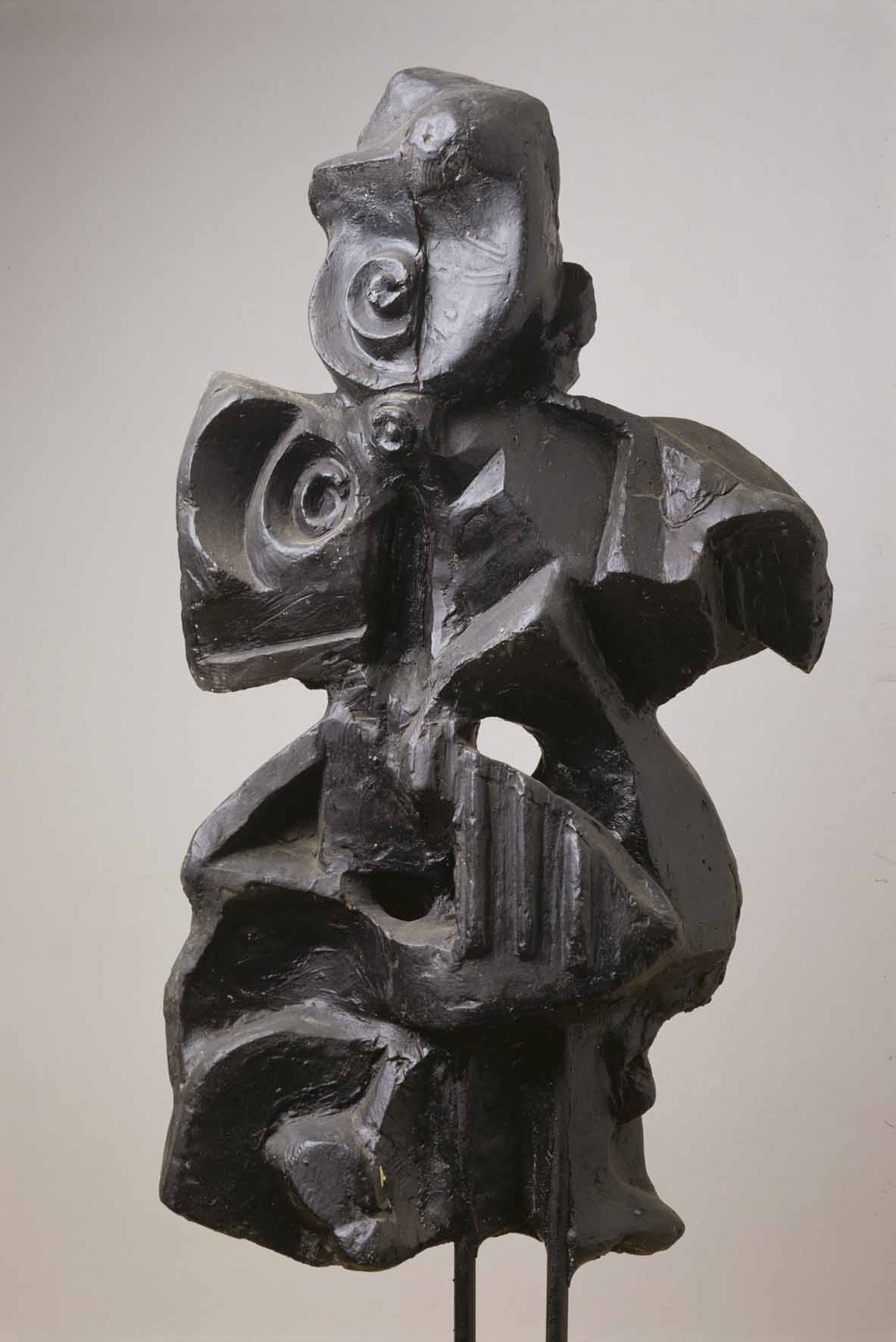
Girl with Snails (1964), polychrome asbestos cement, h. 90 cm}

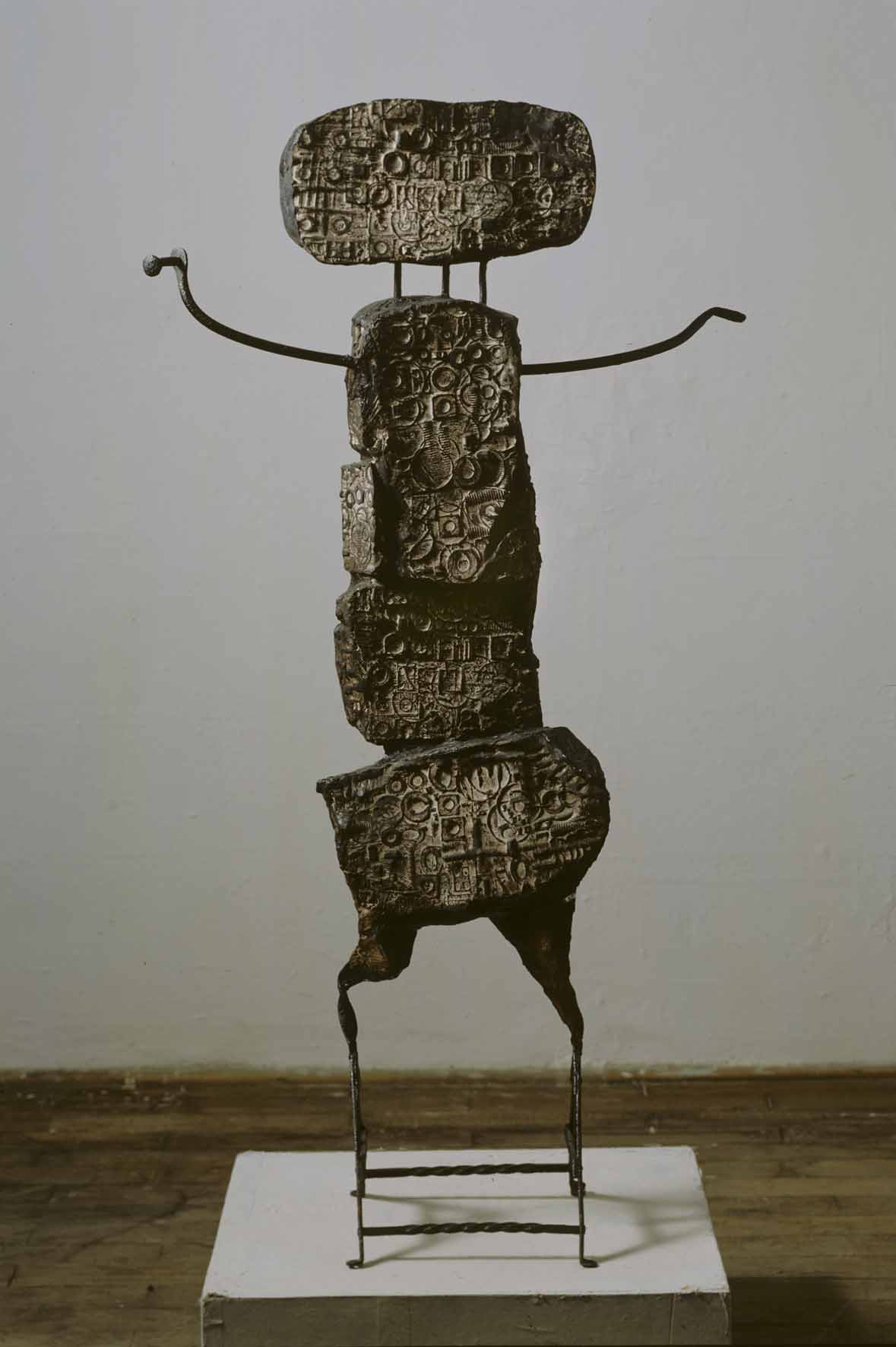
Figure with Imprints (1963)

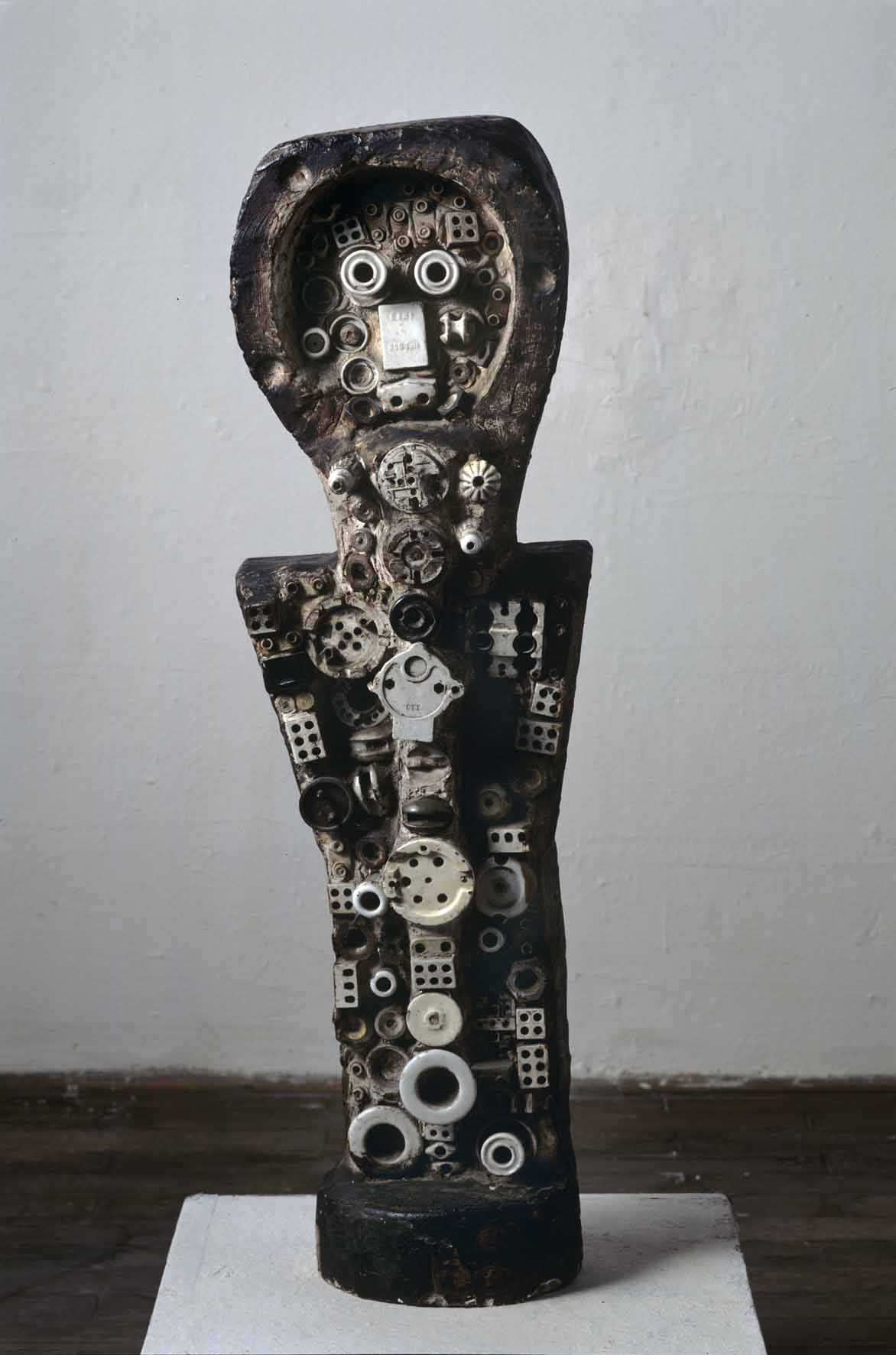
The Little idiot (1965)

Since the mid-1960s, she has been creating pure and almost white non-figurative sculptures made of asbestos cement, some intended as sculptures for public space. Janoušková liked the material for its optical properties – its rough and matt surface absorbs light and then emits it again, as if it were shining itself. The banality of unnecessary things (Bedding, 1964–1965, Duvet, 1966, Pillow) in her sculptures from 1964–1970 brings her closer to Pop art, which in the Czechoslovakia of the time could hardly represent a protest against the overtechnicized society. The closest to Pop art are three sculptures from the end of the 1960s, which, with their formal detachment and strong colouring, break from the existing line of work (Little Garden, Blue on Red) and anticipate some postmodern tendencies of Czech sculpture of the 1980s. In contrast to Kmentová and Szapocznikow, Janoušková did not work with body casts, but in her abstract sculptures of heads and busts from the second half of the 1960s, full of sensuality and baroque dynamics, corporeality is present (Blue Head, 1966, Head with Dimples, 1969).

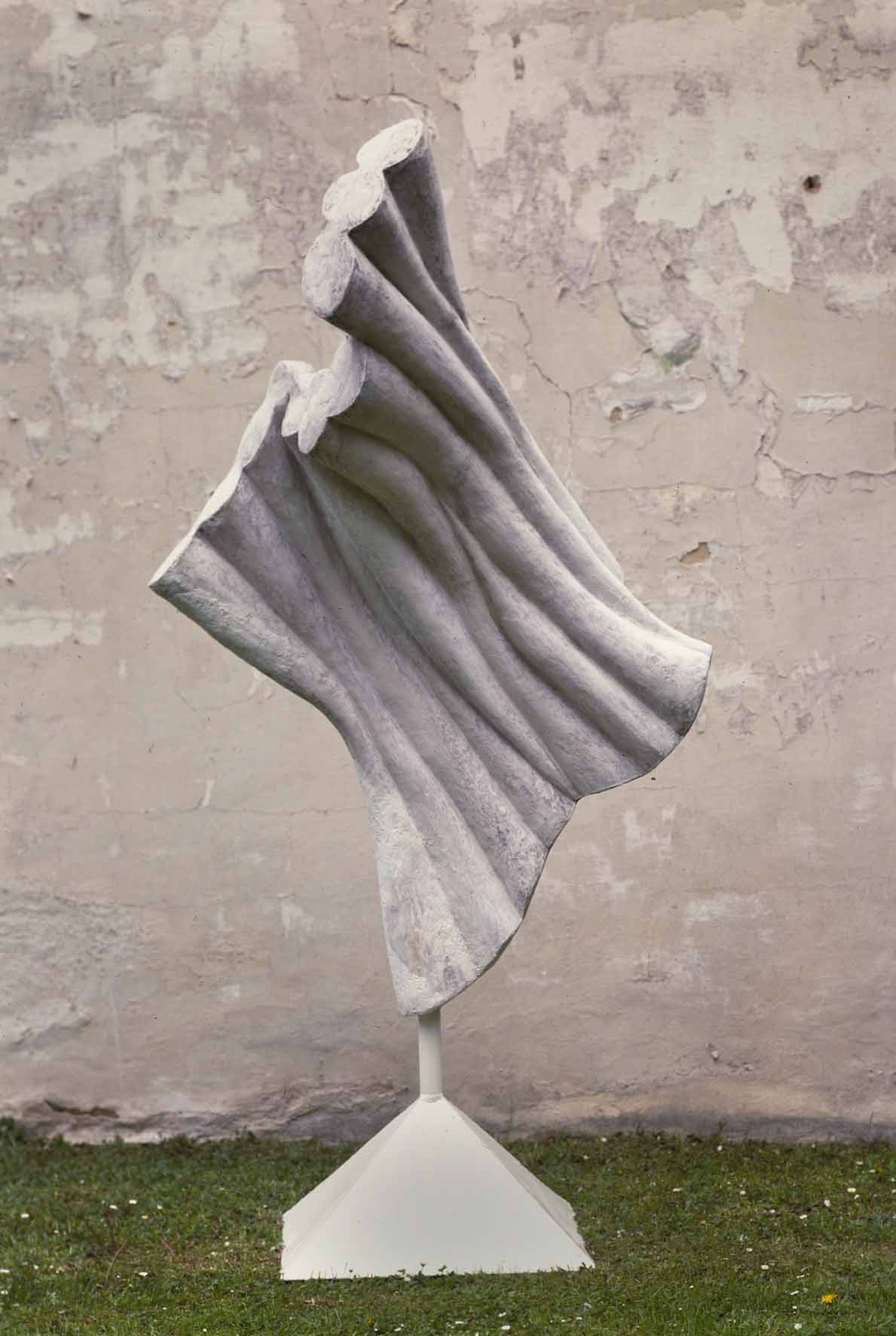
Bedding (1964-1965)

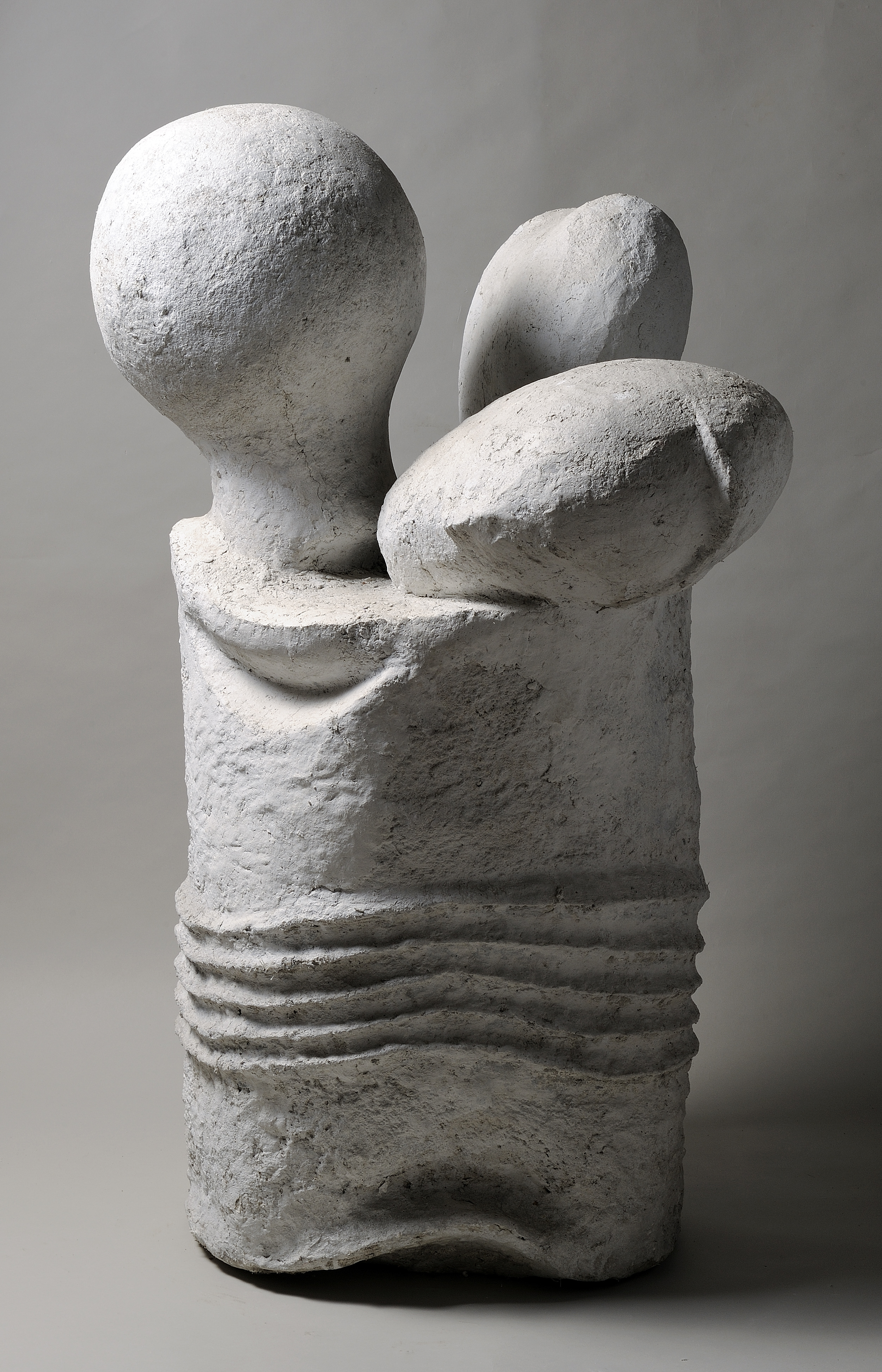
Three tired heads on a barrel, metal and asbestos cement (1966), h. 106 cm

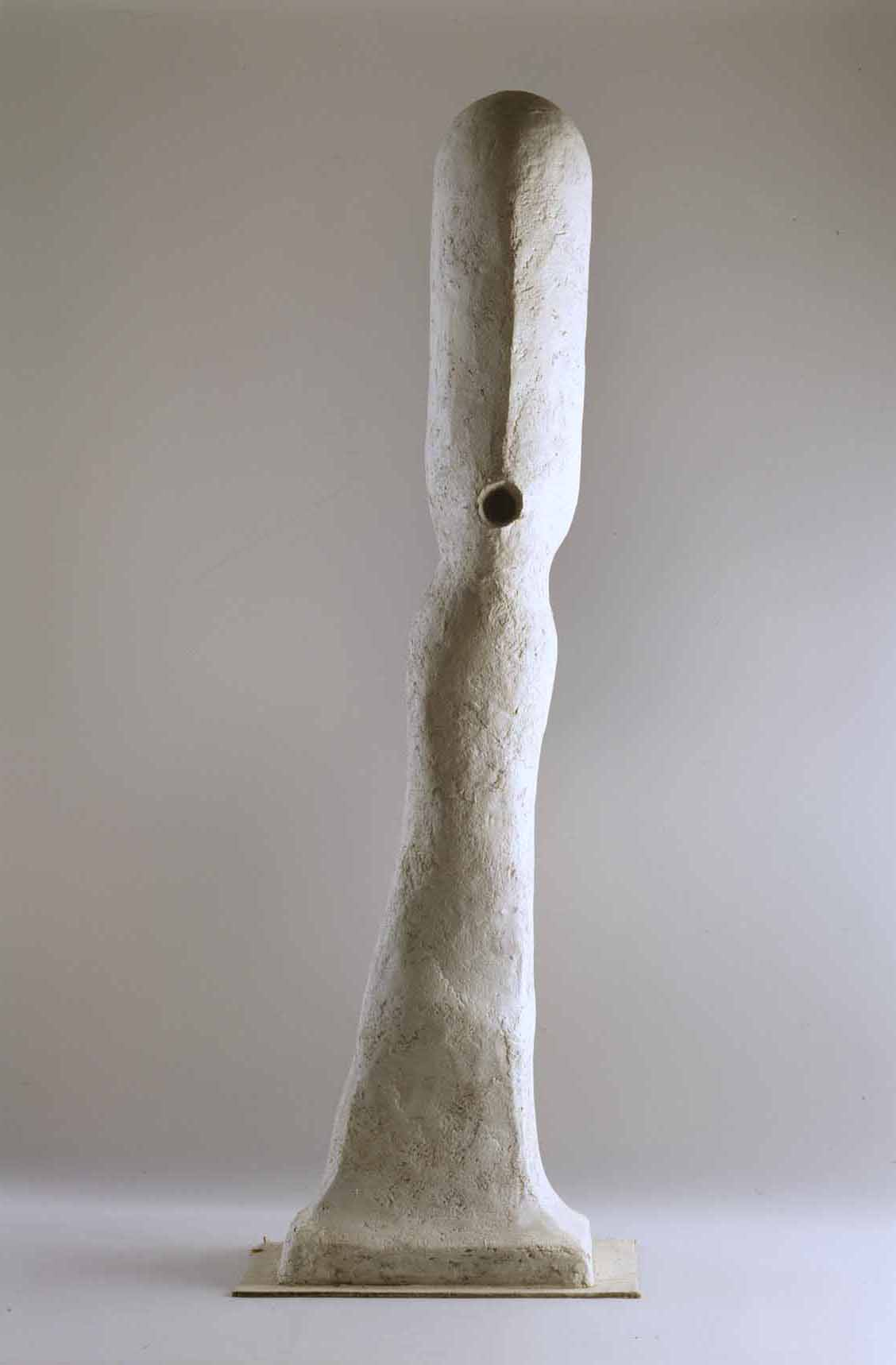
Column (1972), asbestos cement, h. 118 cm

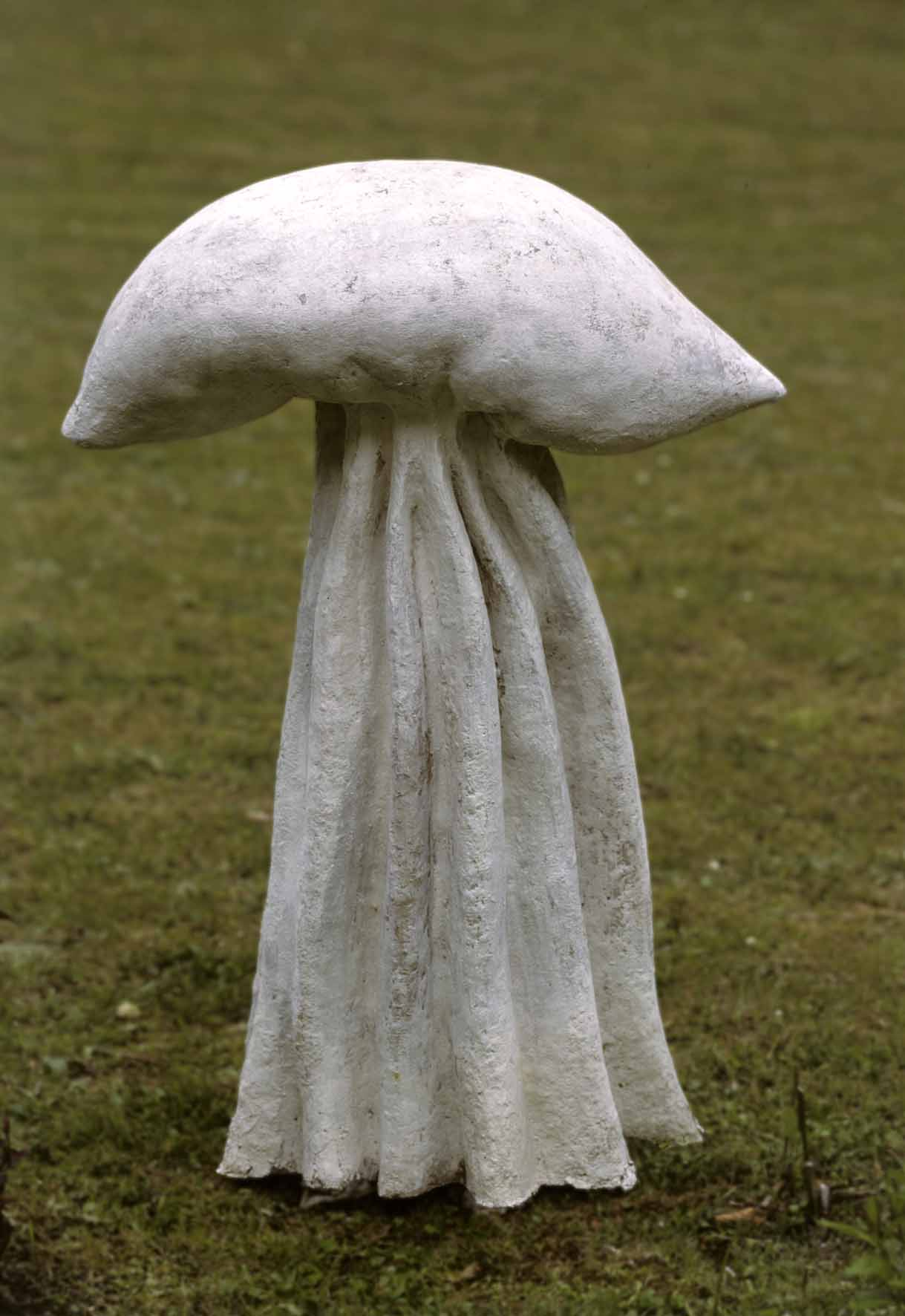
Duvet (1982-1984), corrugated iron, duvet, asbestos cement, 115 cm

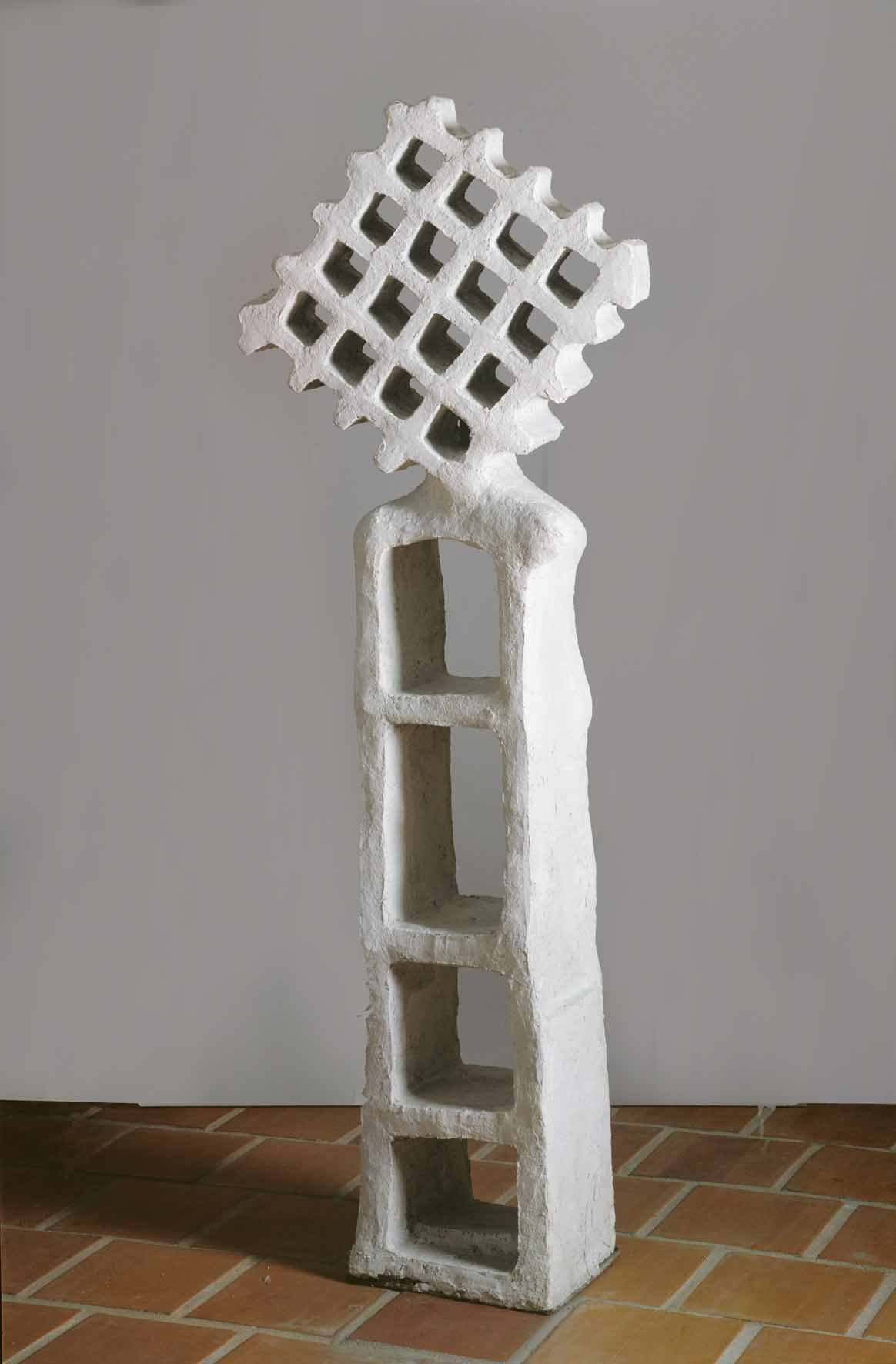
Drawers (1989-1990), asbestos cement, h. 175 cm

Janoušková uses various metal objects as support for figurative and abstract sculptures made of asbestos cement – parts of agricultural machinery and tools, barrels or petrol tanks of motorcycles, building blocks, etc. The resulting new form sometimes has a pompous monumentality, sometimes it resembles a chapel (God's Passion) or is an ironic pun, but retains modesty. Asbestos cement unifies the surface (Three Tired Heads on a Barrel, 1966), suppressing irrelevant details and the original function of the object, giving it a poetic content. Her spare and frontally conceived Heads resemble prehistoric idols in their shape and depict faces crying out or staring into the void. They represent the will for synthesis and the need to awaken in the self and others a sense of identification with the primal depiction of man and to return life to its human dimension and content. They illustrate the anguished feeling of life in the hopeless situation of totalitarian regime of Czechoslovakia seized by the occupation troops and later also reflect loss of her husband. One of the most somber sculptures is the black Reclining Figure with helplessly spread arms, evoking the motif of the Crucifixion.

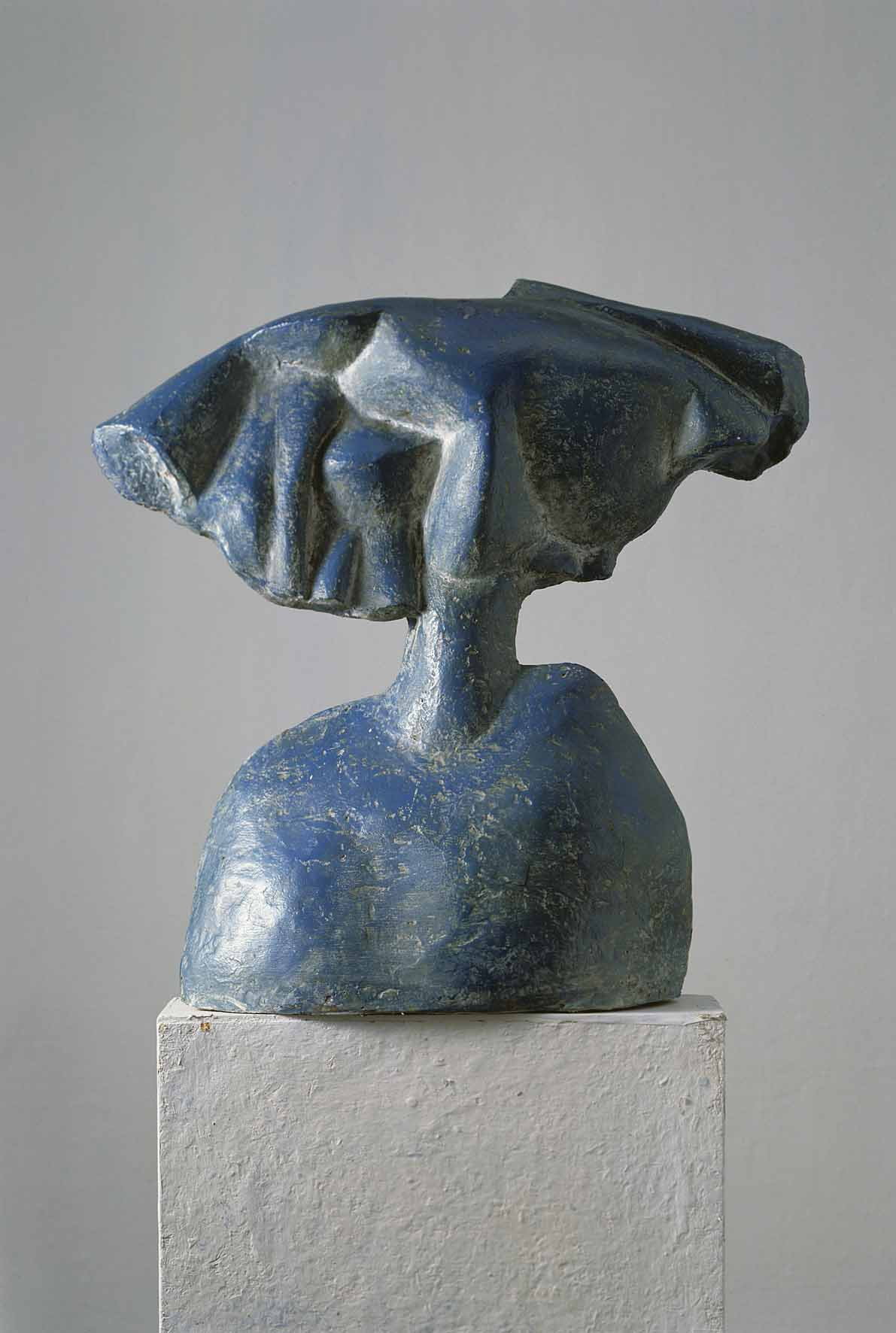
Blue Head (1966), blue coloured asbestos cement

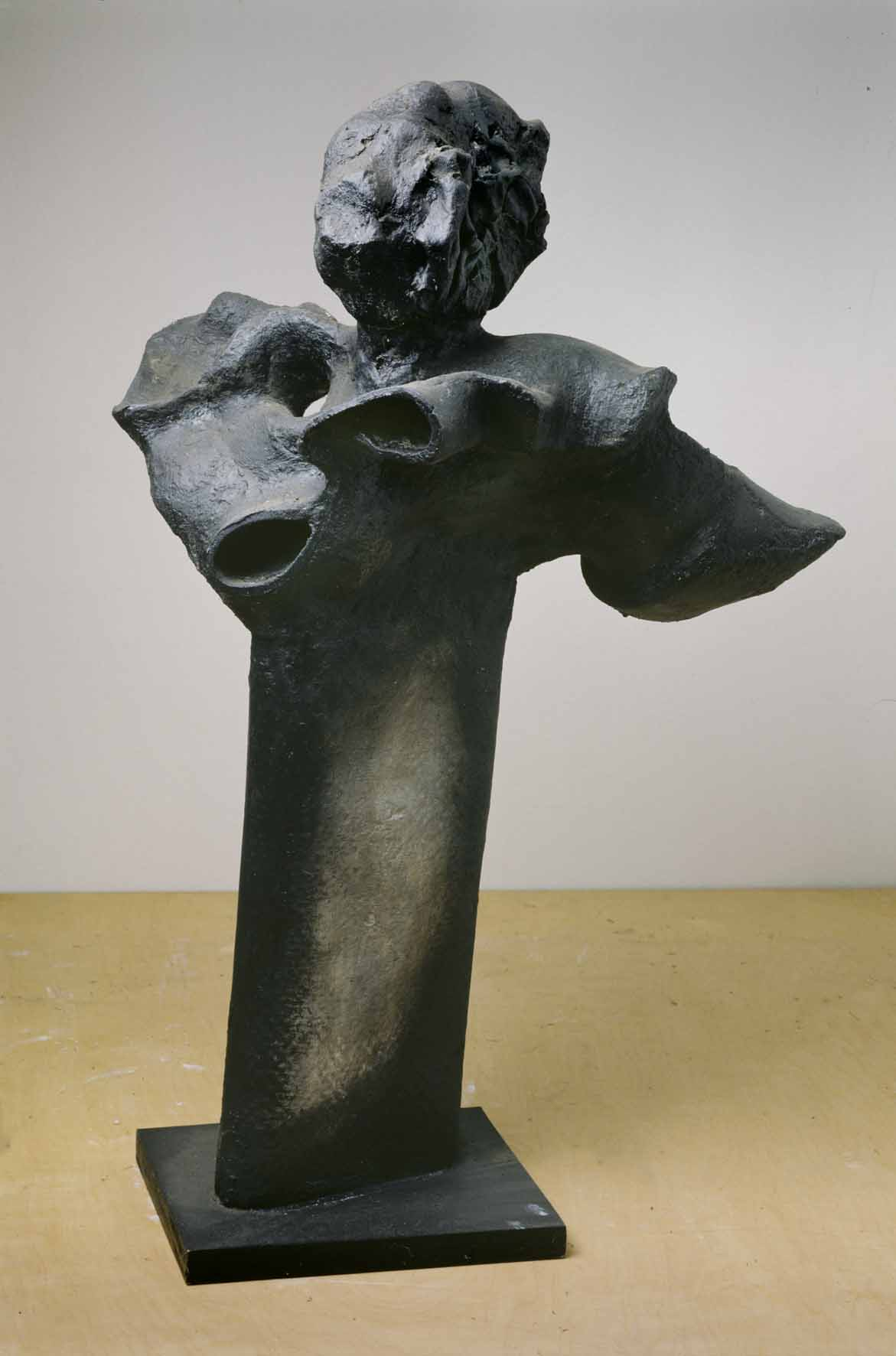
Black Angel (1969), asbestos cement, h. 68 cm

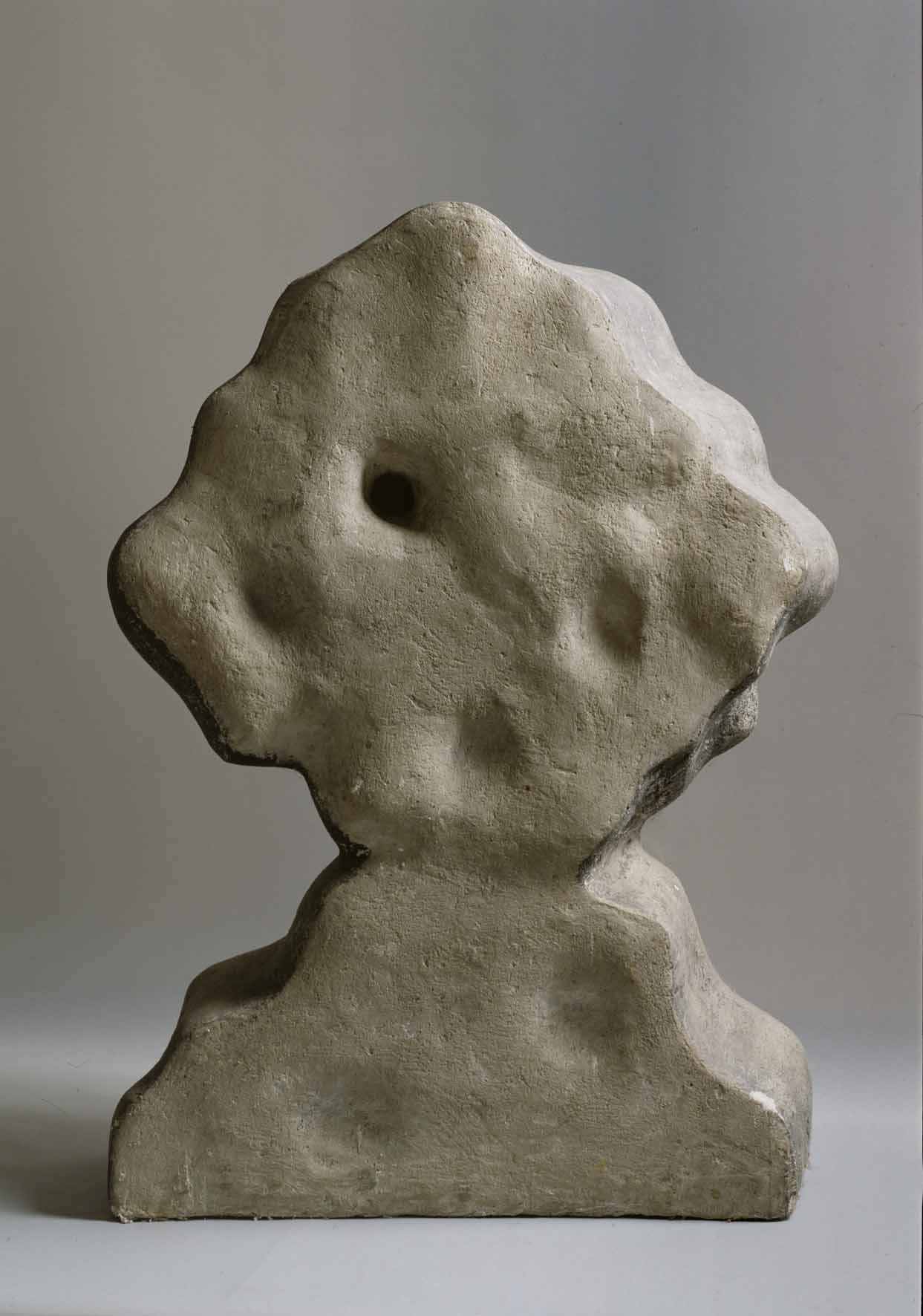
Head with dimples (1969), asbestos cement, h. 77 cm

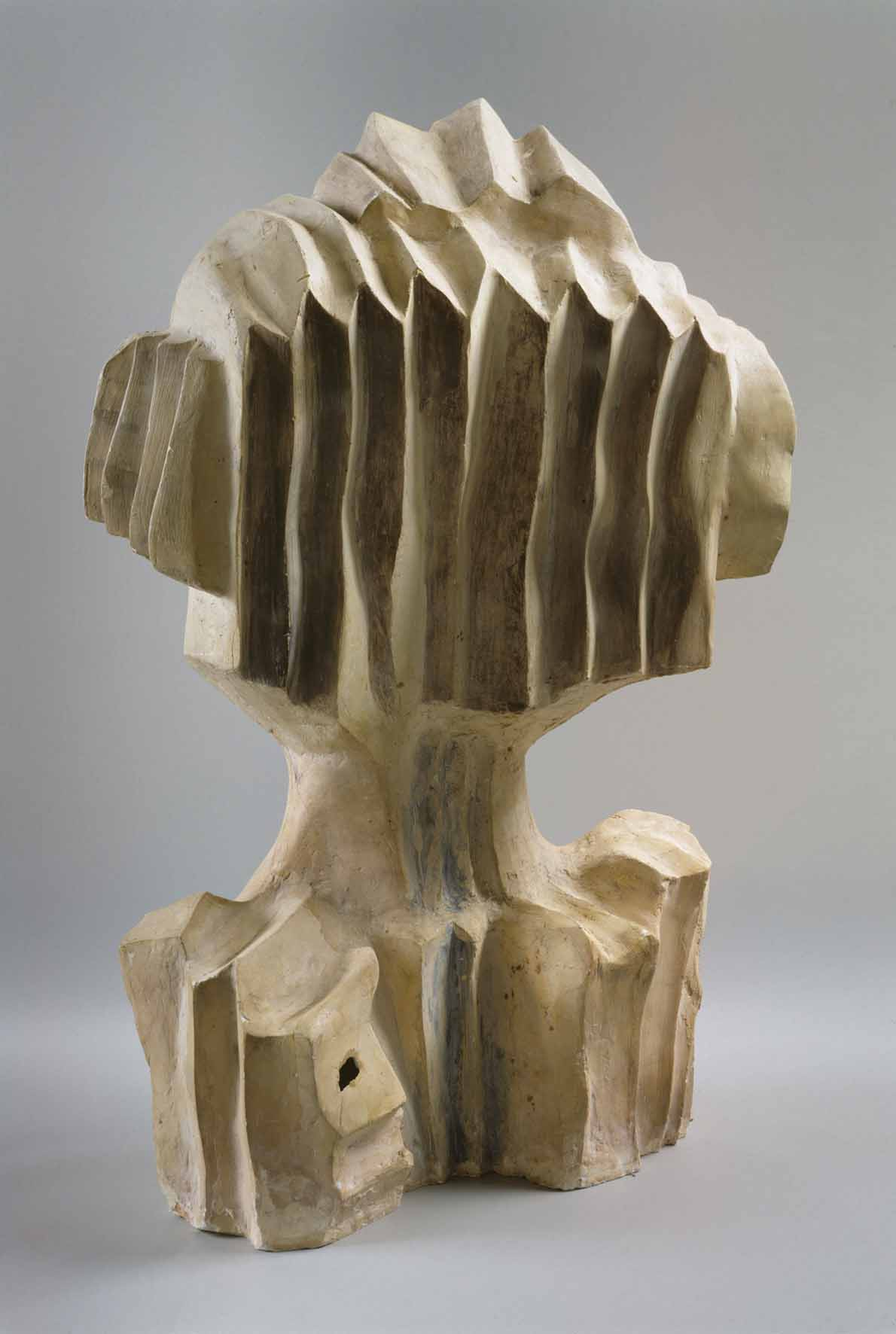
Wrinkled Head (1969), polychrome plaster, h. 72 cm

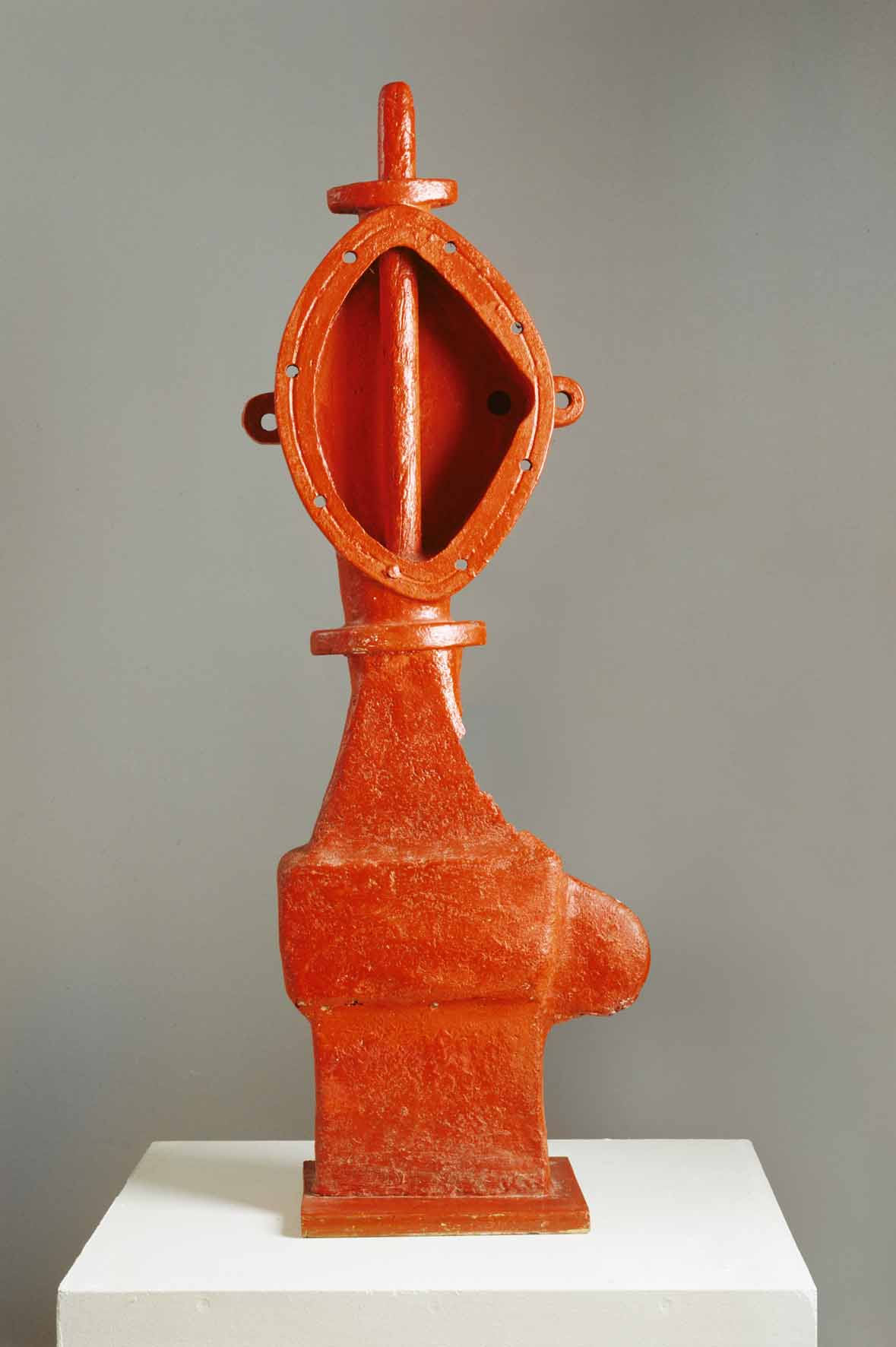
Red Head (1970), iron, plaster, h. 84 cm

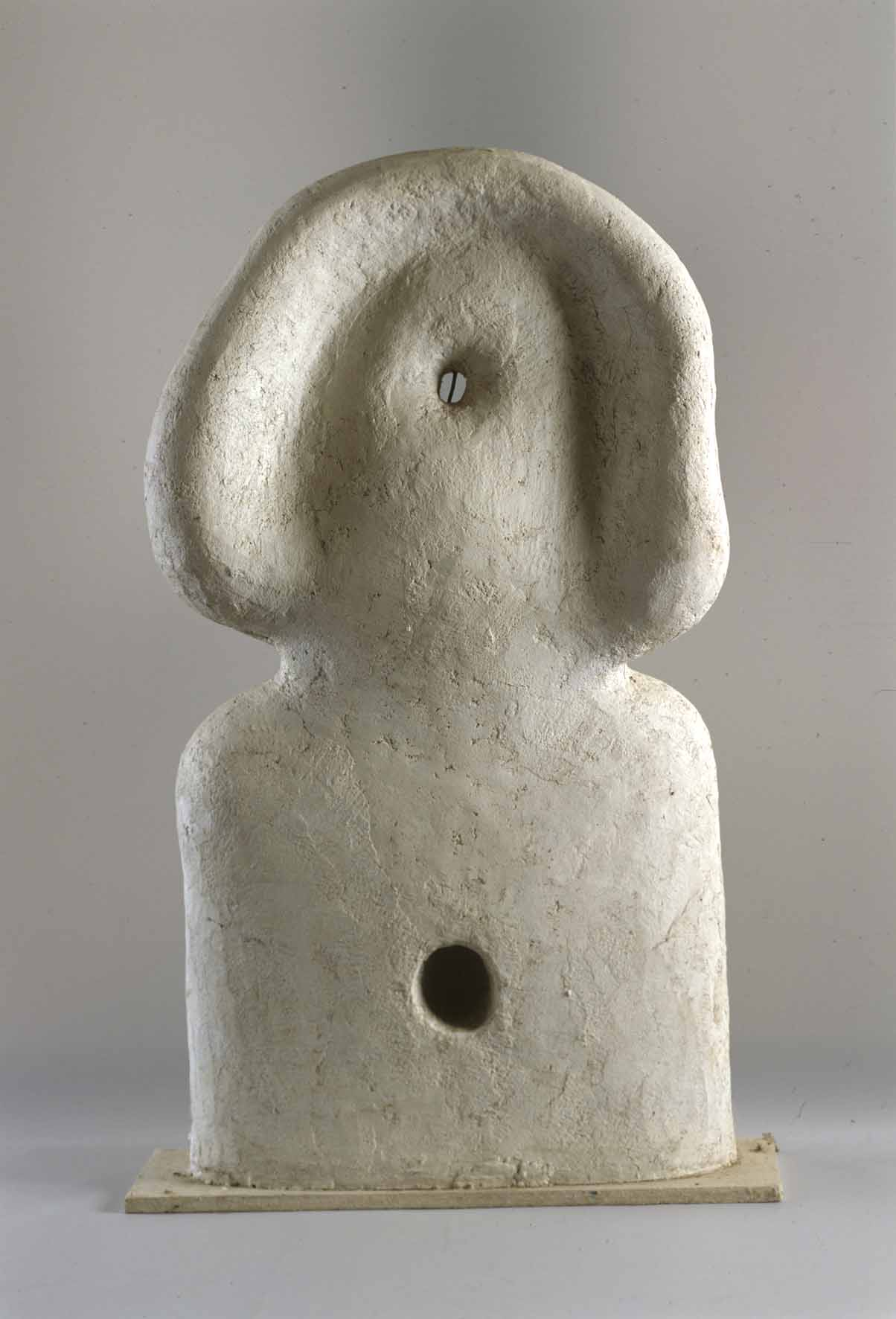
White Figure' (1978), asbestos cement h. 86 cm

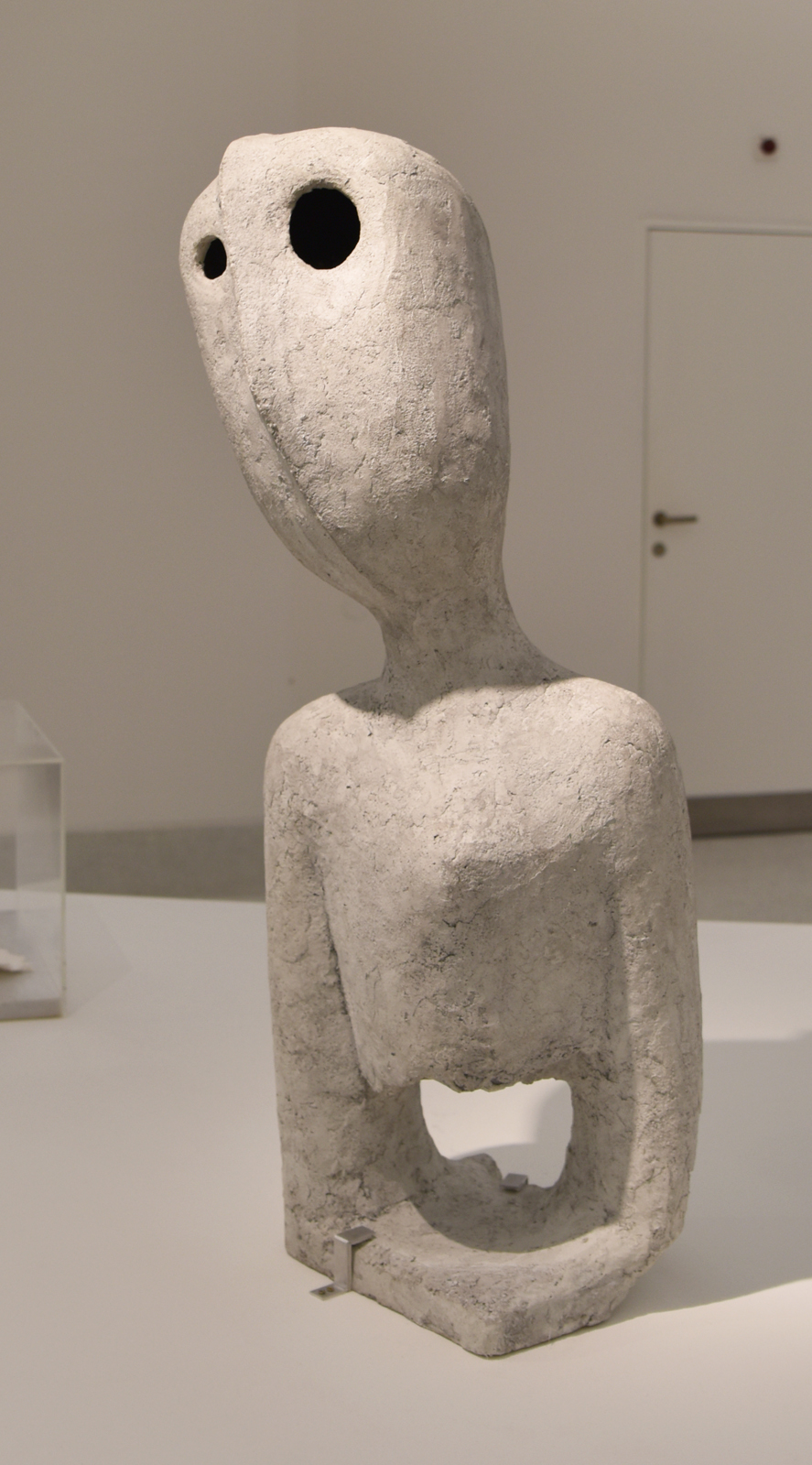
Grey Figure', 1986, National Gallery Prague

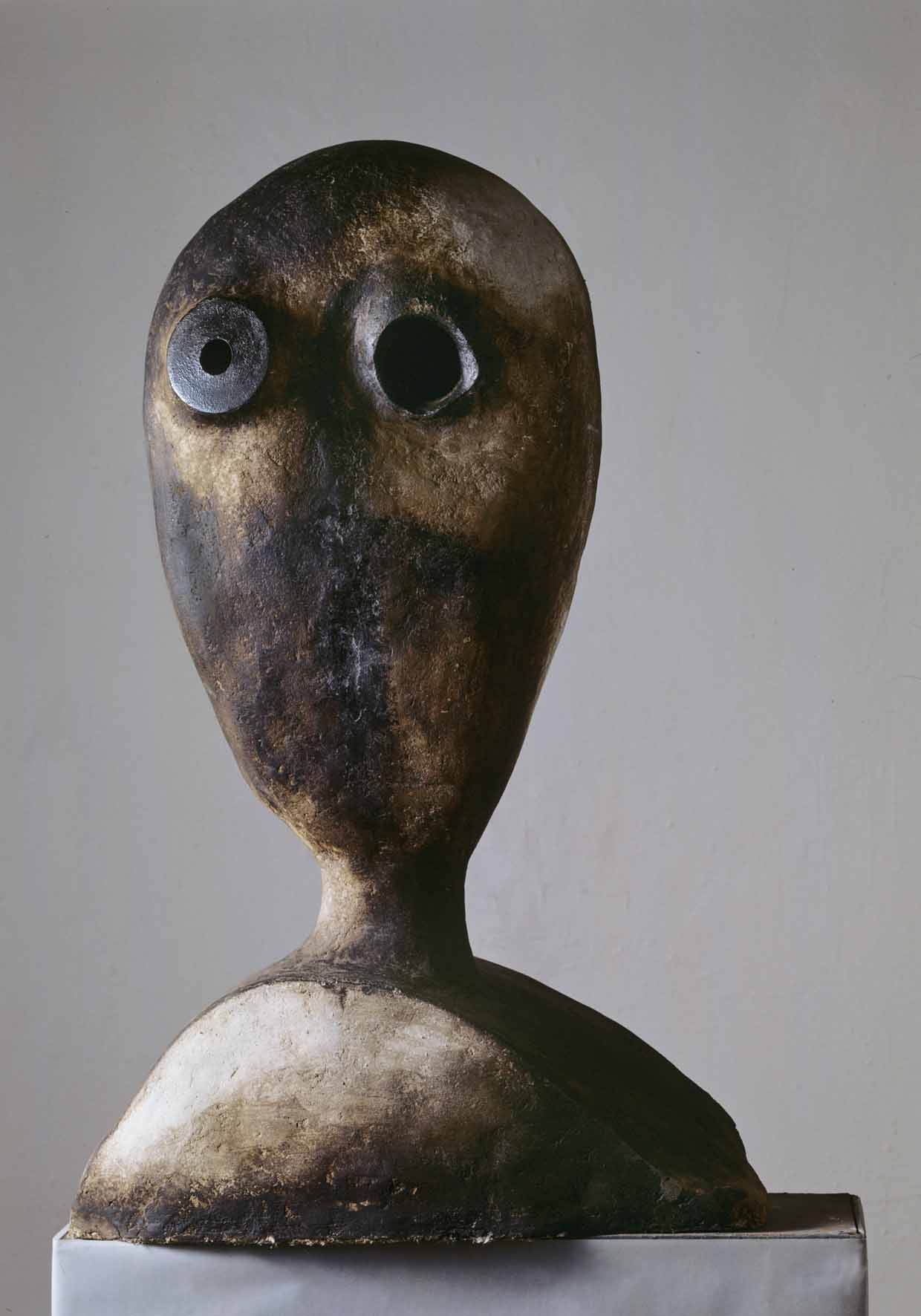
'Head (1990s)

From 1963 onwards, Janoušková was attracted by the distinctive colour of enamelled sheet metal and initially used smaller fragments as part of the surface of flat hanging figures and totems made of plaster or asbestos cement. Frequent motif of the cross is not patheticized and, given the material used, is devoid of tragedy.

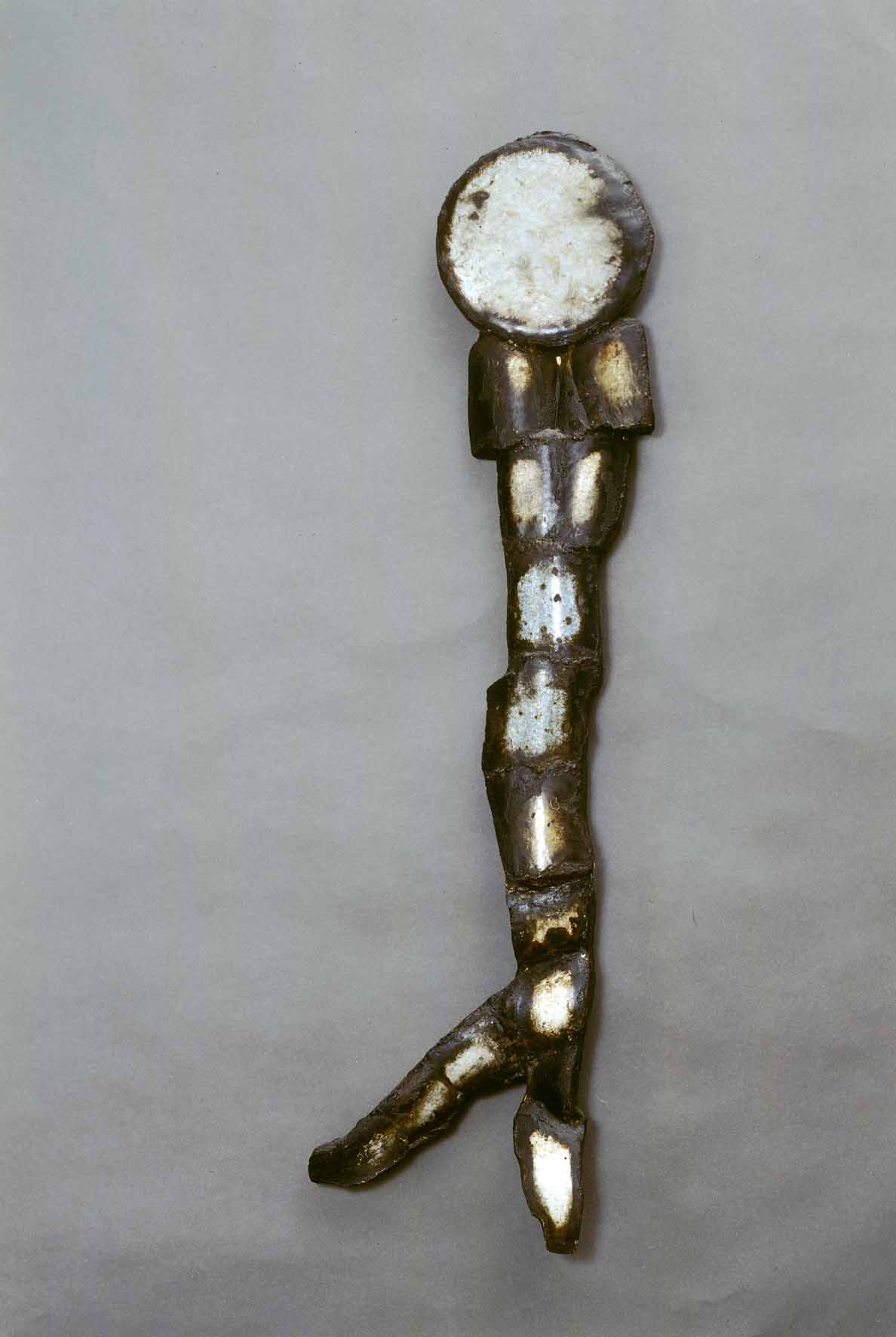
Grey Enamel (1963-1964)

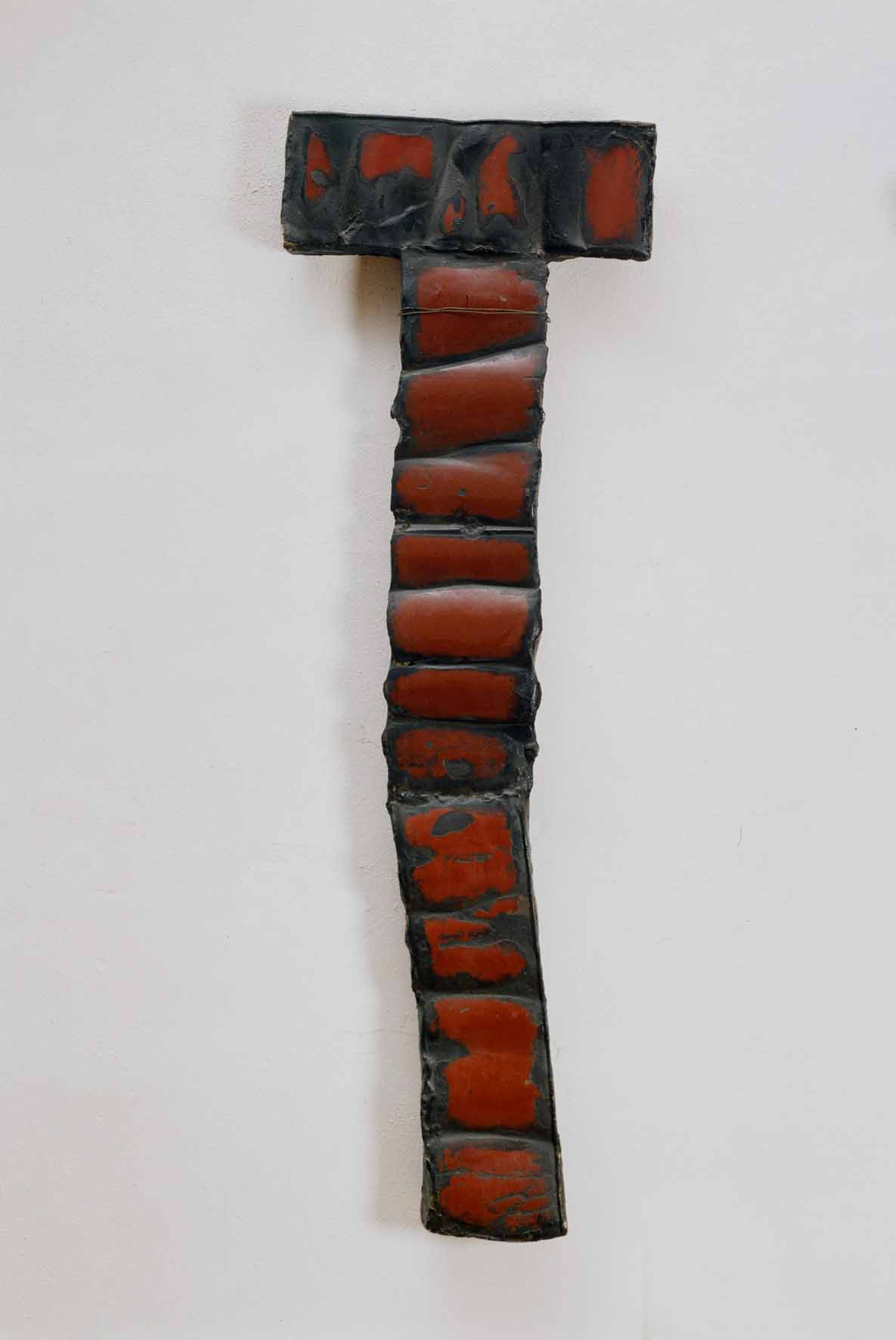
Cross (1965), enamel, asbestos cement, h. 112 cm

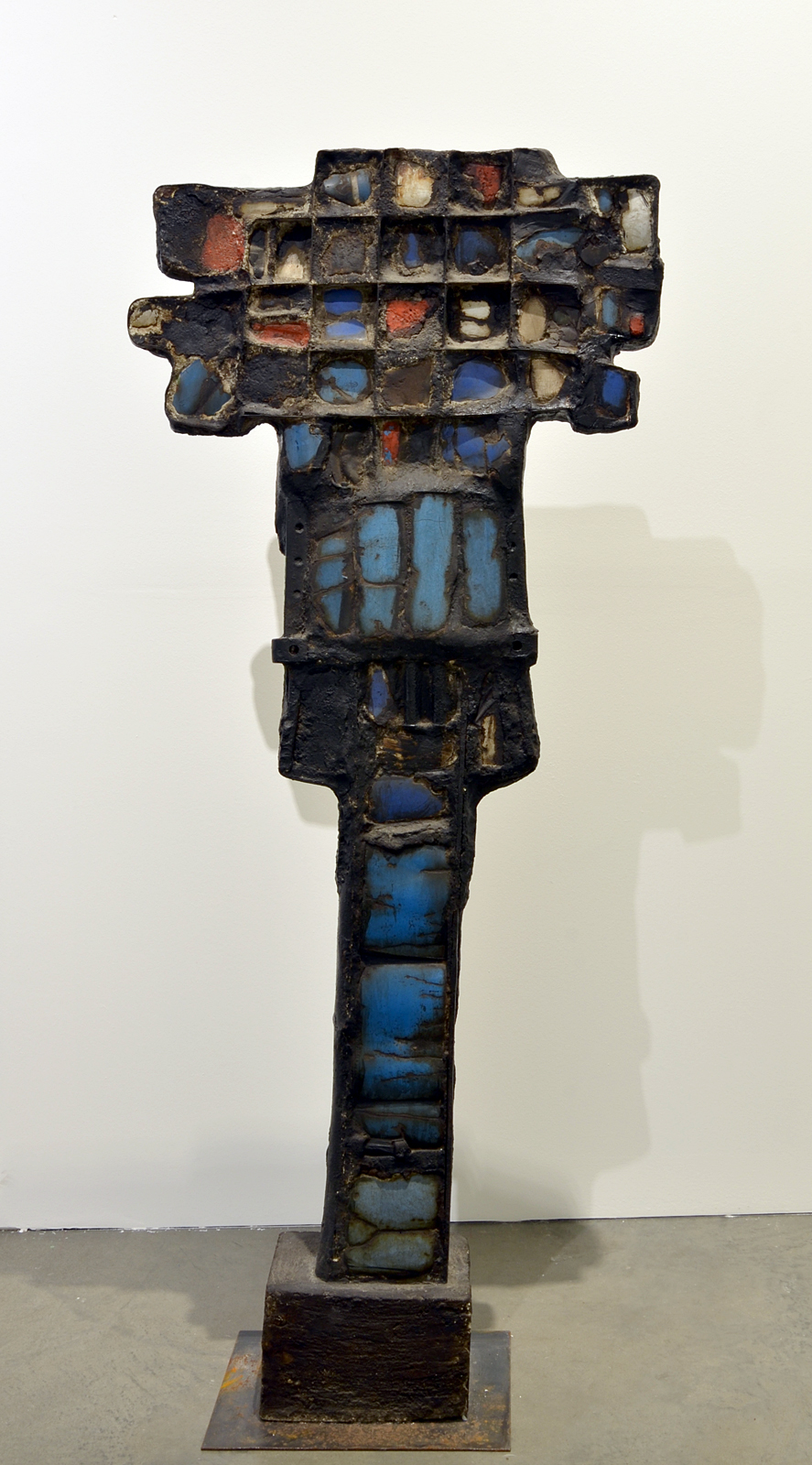
Totem (1960s), Museum Kampa

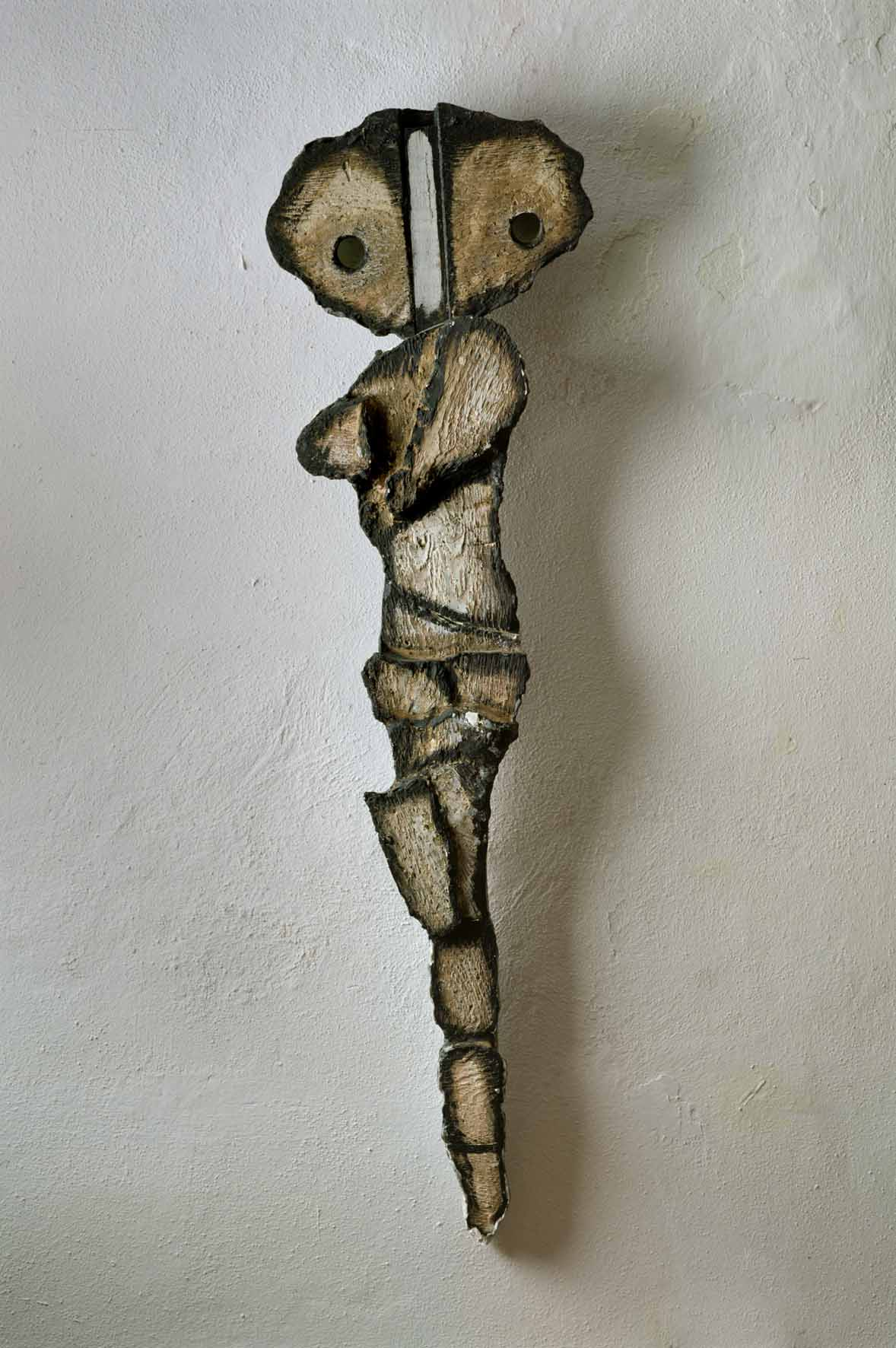
Human Tadpole (1967-1968), wood imprint, polychrome plaster, 120 cm

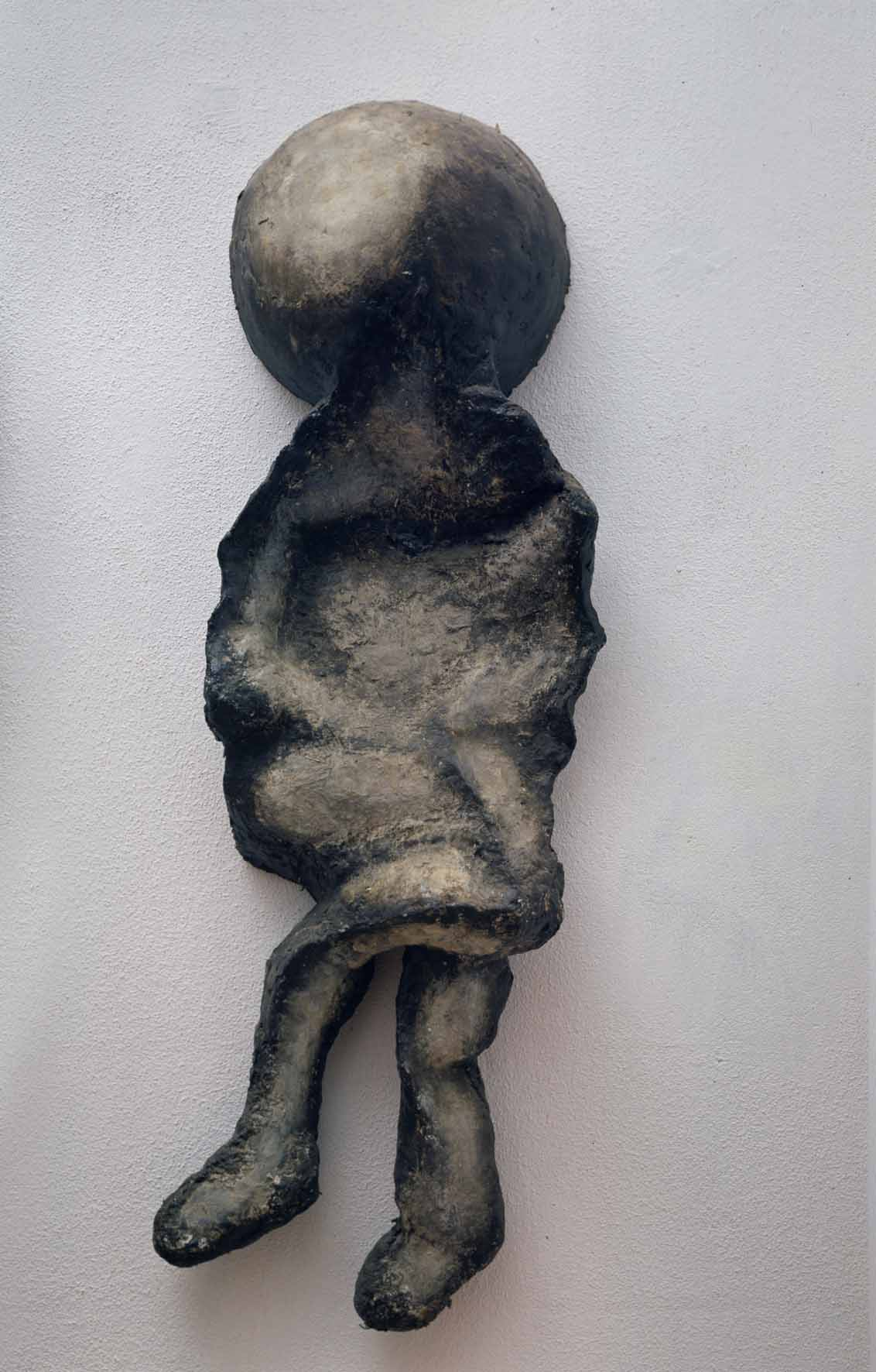
Alien Child (1982-1984), asbestos cement, h. 122 cm

Shortly thereafter, she learned to cut sheet metal using flame and manual arc welding and produced a series of figures assembled from parts of used and discarded enamel objects, joined with welding wire. She works with the taille directe method and applies color combinations of red, blue, white, black, and grey. Janoušková utilizes the physical properties of the materials through techniques such as surface texturing, flame marking, and wire joining with arc welding. The colored enamels retain characteristics of the original objects, contributing to the visual effect of the sculptures. Some works have been noted to resemble folk Morans brought out by children in villages at the end of winter. In her practice, she combines found materials with imaginative elements to create new sculptural forms.

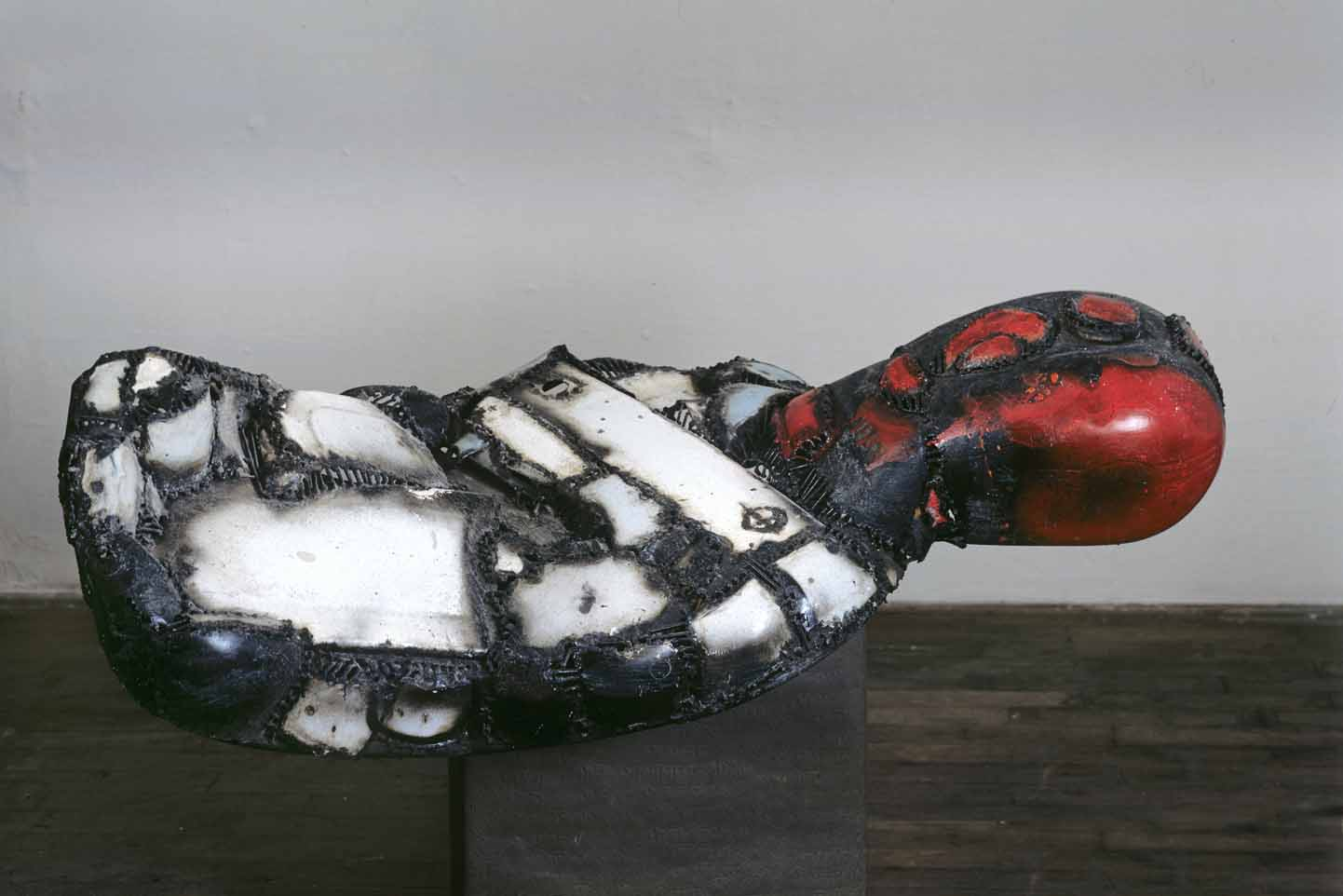
Hunched Figure (1972), welded enamel

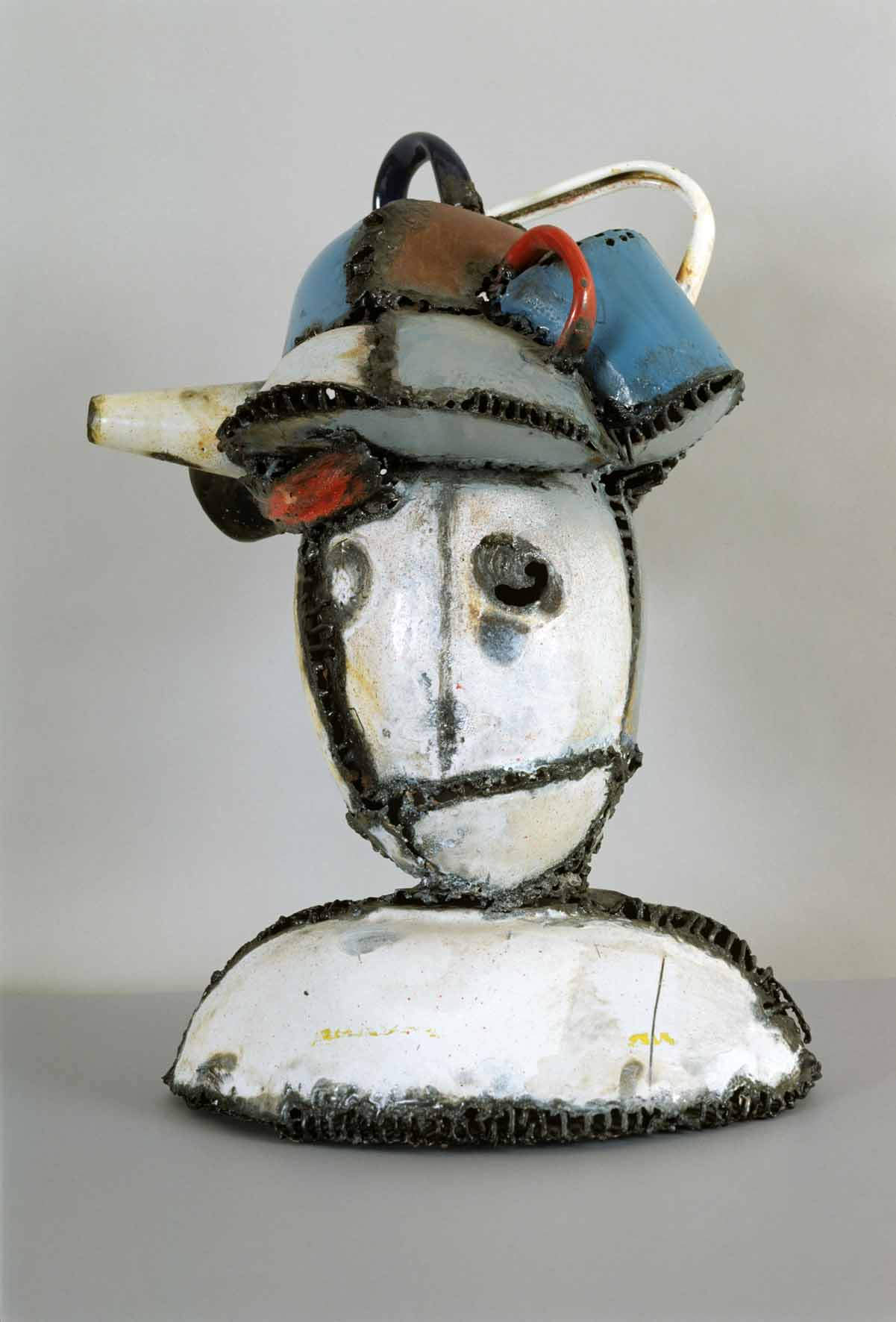
Long eared Head (1975), welded enamel, h. 48 cm

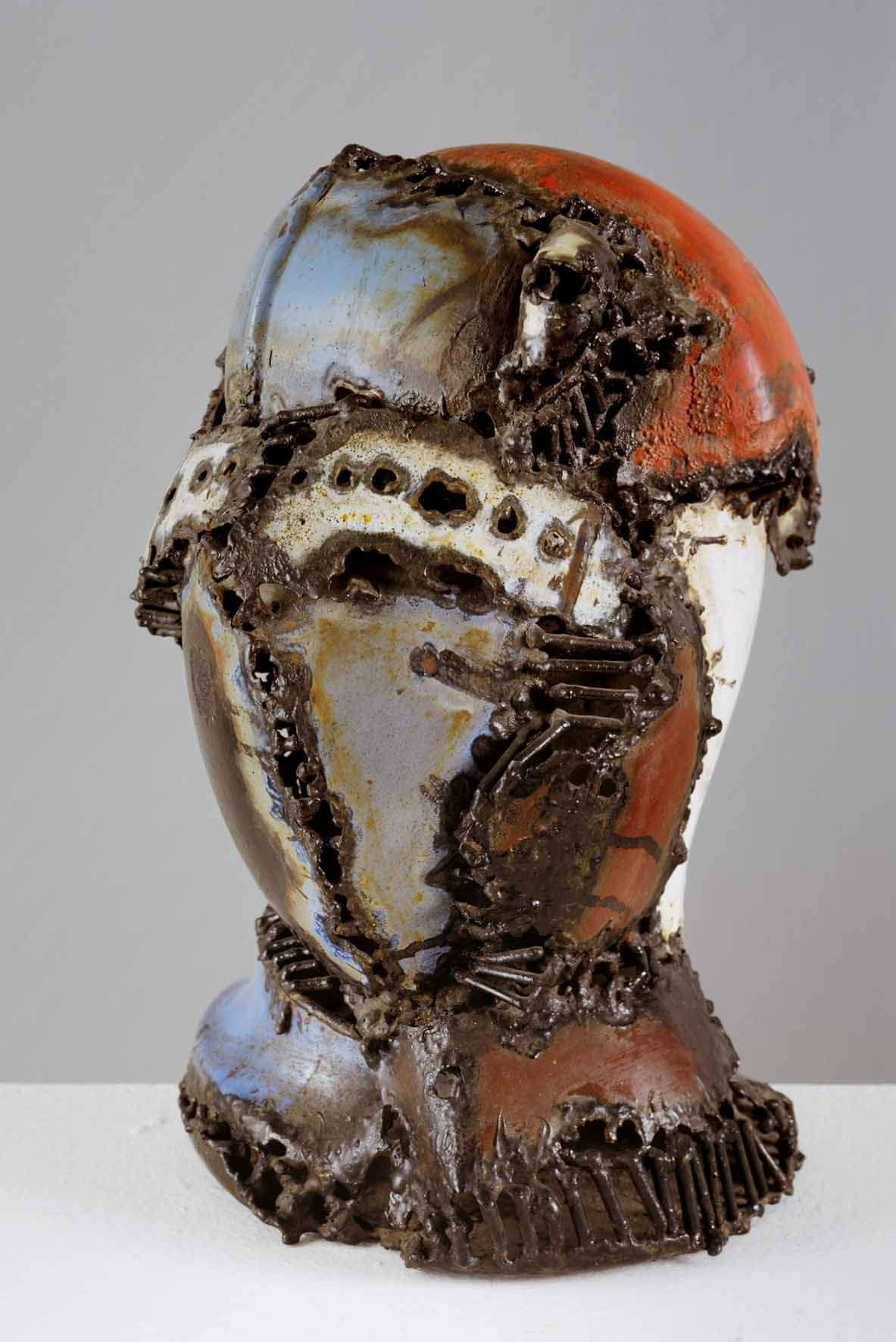
Head (1986), welded enamel, h. 30 cm

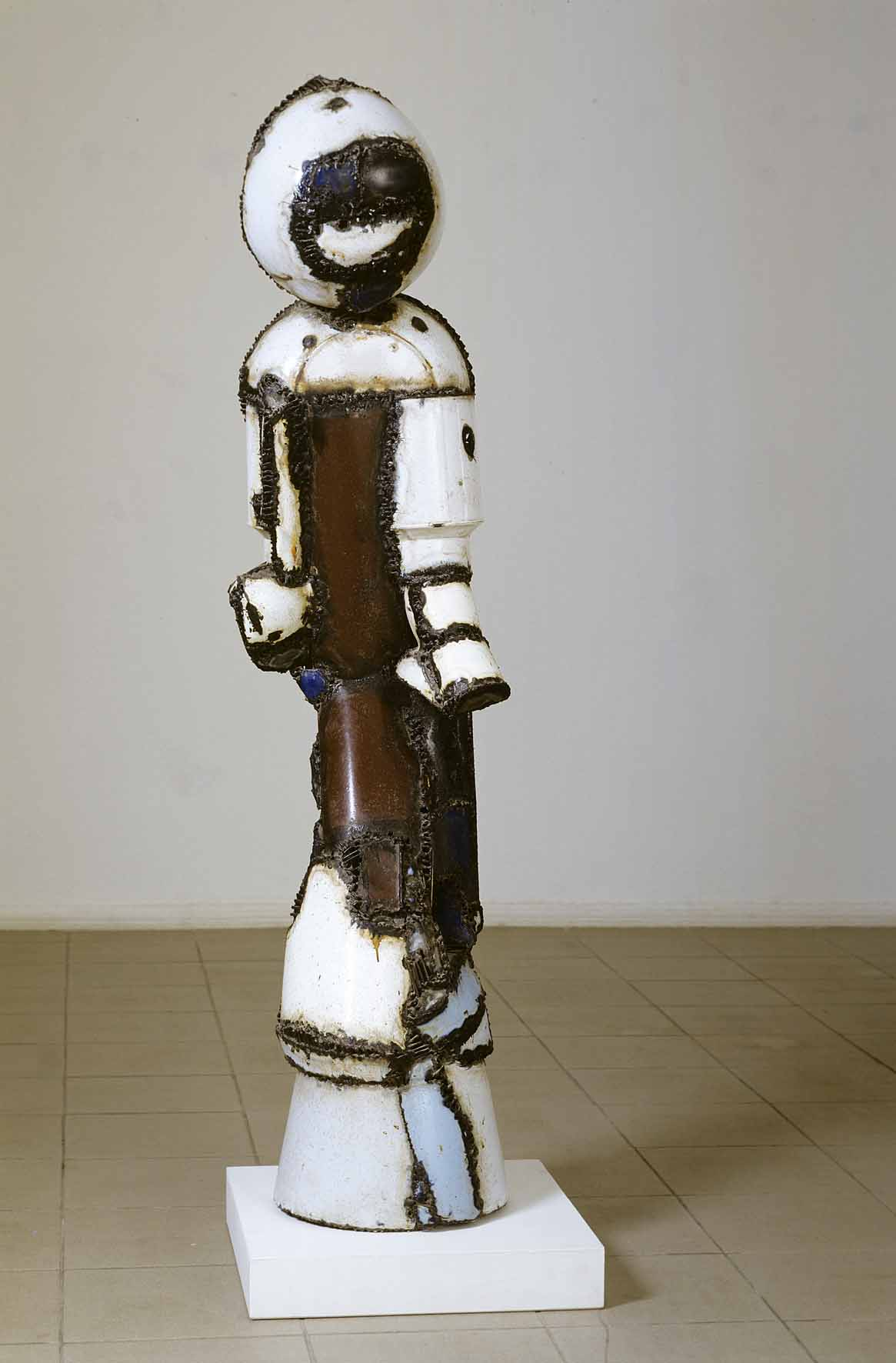
Figure (1978), welded enamel

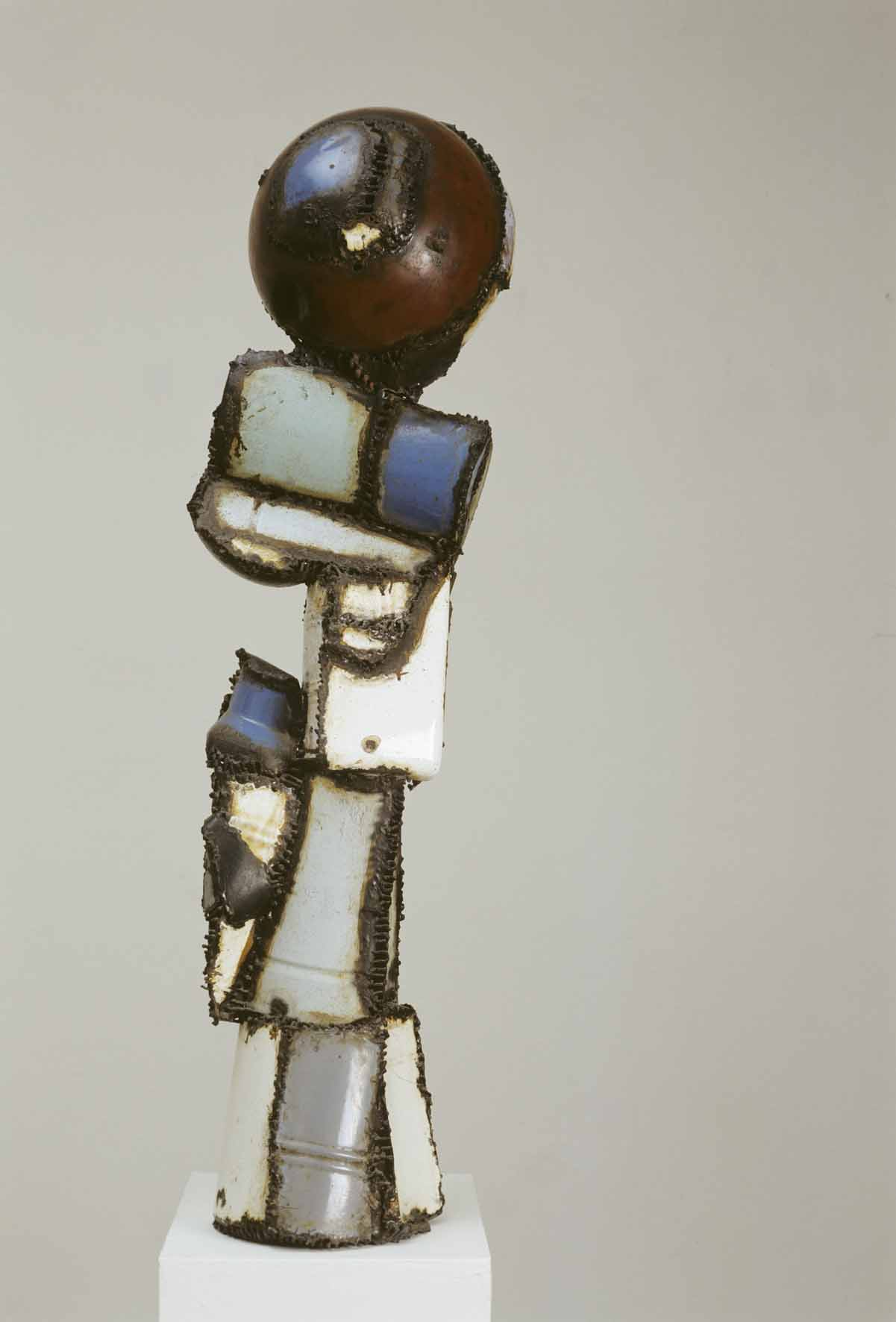
Figure (1980), welded enamel, h. 107 cm

The figures are not overloaded with fateful content and retain a human, non-heroic dimension. The resulting head, bust or figure is constructed with a slight irony, but the grotesque appearance carries a serious message. The banal material coming from the dump is used in a surprising way, retaining a strong physical presence and creating an unexpected relationship between the original and the new meaning of things. The final assemblage, which elevates the used material to a supreme aesthetic level, gives the impression of preciousness. Her sculptures are grotesque and cheerful, but also dignified and, from a certain point of view, tragic; they have an absurd and somewhat ironic monumentality. Janoušková manages to impose a very personal and even intimate content on the monumental form. The non-classical joining of material, in which the seams are not smoothed out, but rather accentuated and thematized, is a reference to the traditional feminine activity of mending and offers a deeper meaning as a metaphor for the healing of wounds and cracks on the body and soul.

Věra Janoušková's best-known and most appreciated figurative work is a reflection of her difficult social situation and personal emotions in the 1970s and 1980s, when a large part of her generation lived in imposed isolation without the opportunity to exhibit (Black Angel, asbestos-cement, 1969). In the early 1970s, she created unique but emotionally powerful figurative sculptures made of enamel sheets (The Hunched Figure,1972). She began welding the sculpture Angel for Vitík (1972) at the time of Vitík's (Note: Painter Alois Vitík (1910–1972) was a founding member of UB 12 creative group, close friend of Věra Janoušková.) serious illness and completed it after his death. The figures are enveloped by sadness, the welds are reminiscence of the injury, but despite the slant of the figure, they still stand and provide a certain hope. Since the mid-1970s, her welded sculptures have had a three-dimensional volume, dynamic construction and sovereign sculptural qualities. The very material from which they are assembled lends them a certain weightlessness while maintaining their volume. The torsal sculptures' stable stance is balanced by the counterpoise. The figures are jagged and not straightforward, pulled into themselves but retaining a human dignity and resilience. Alongside the life-size sculptures, a number of smaller sculptures have been created in which a more playful and relaxed quality prevails.

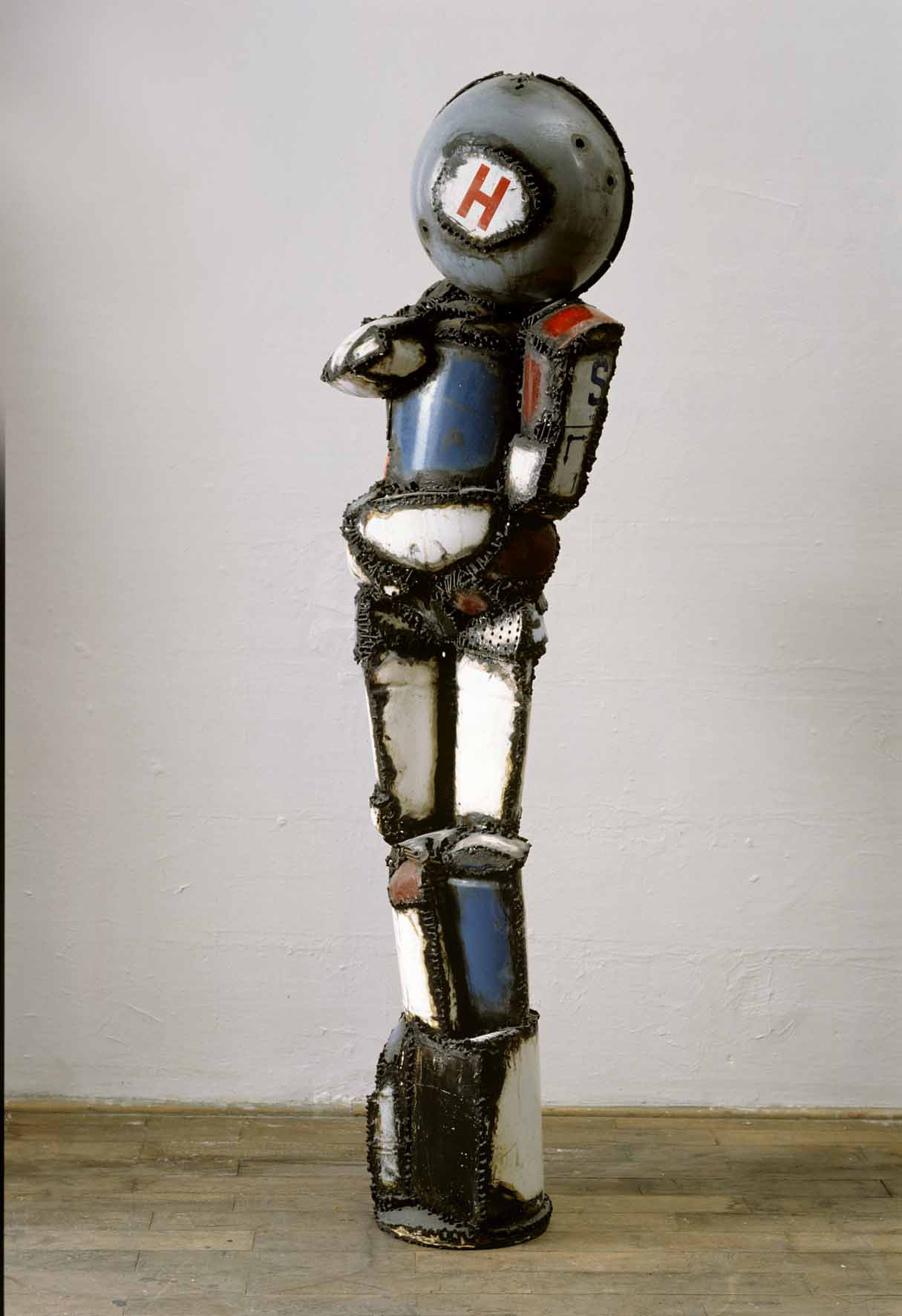
Figure with Letters (1984)

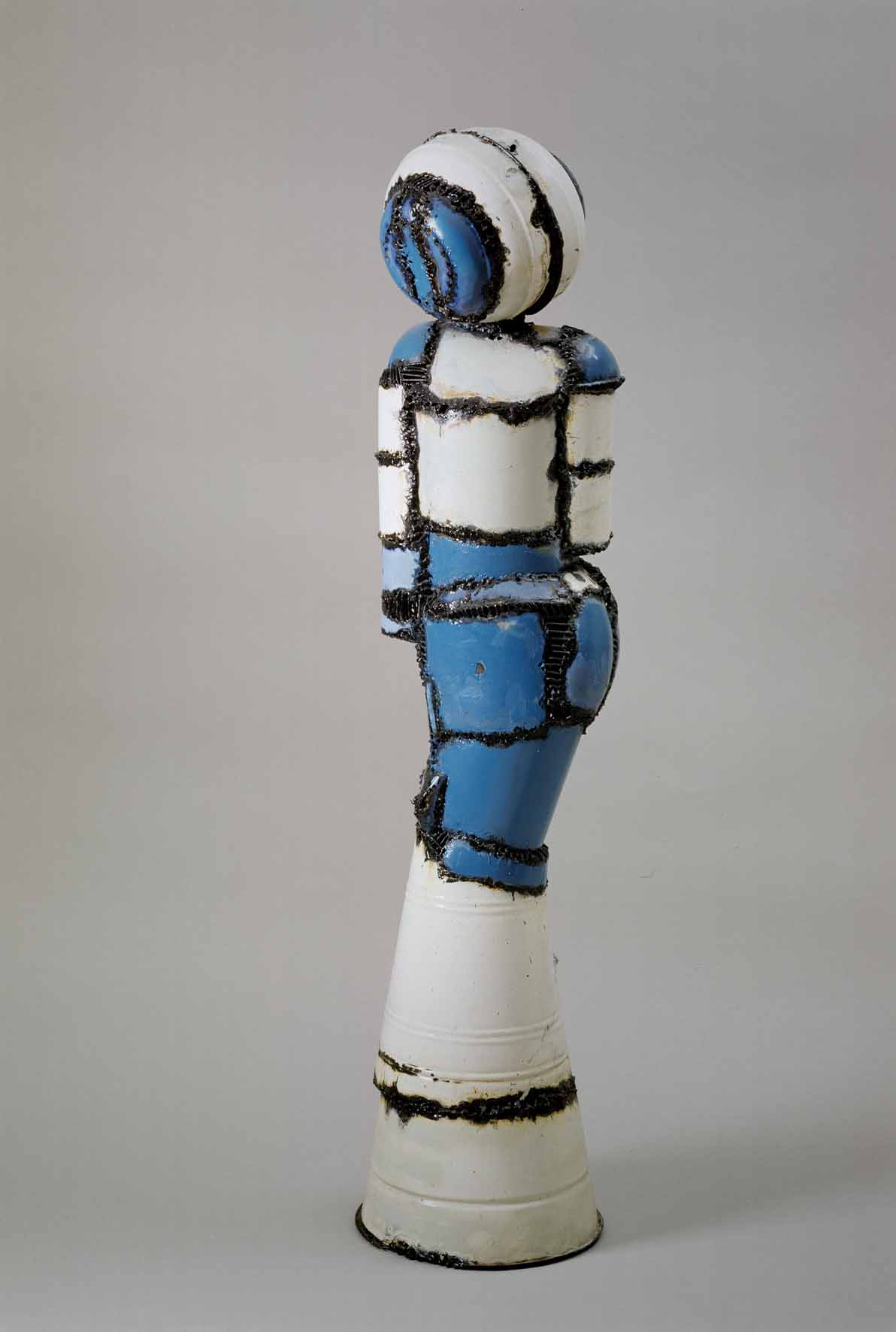
Slim Figure (1985), welded enamel, h. 139 cm

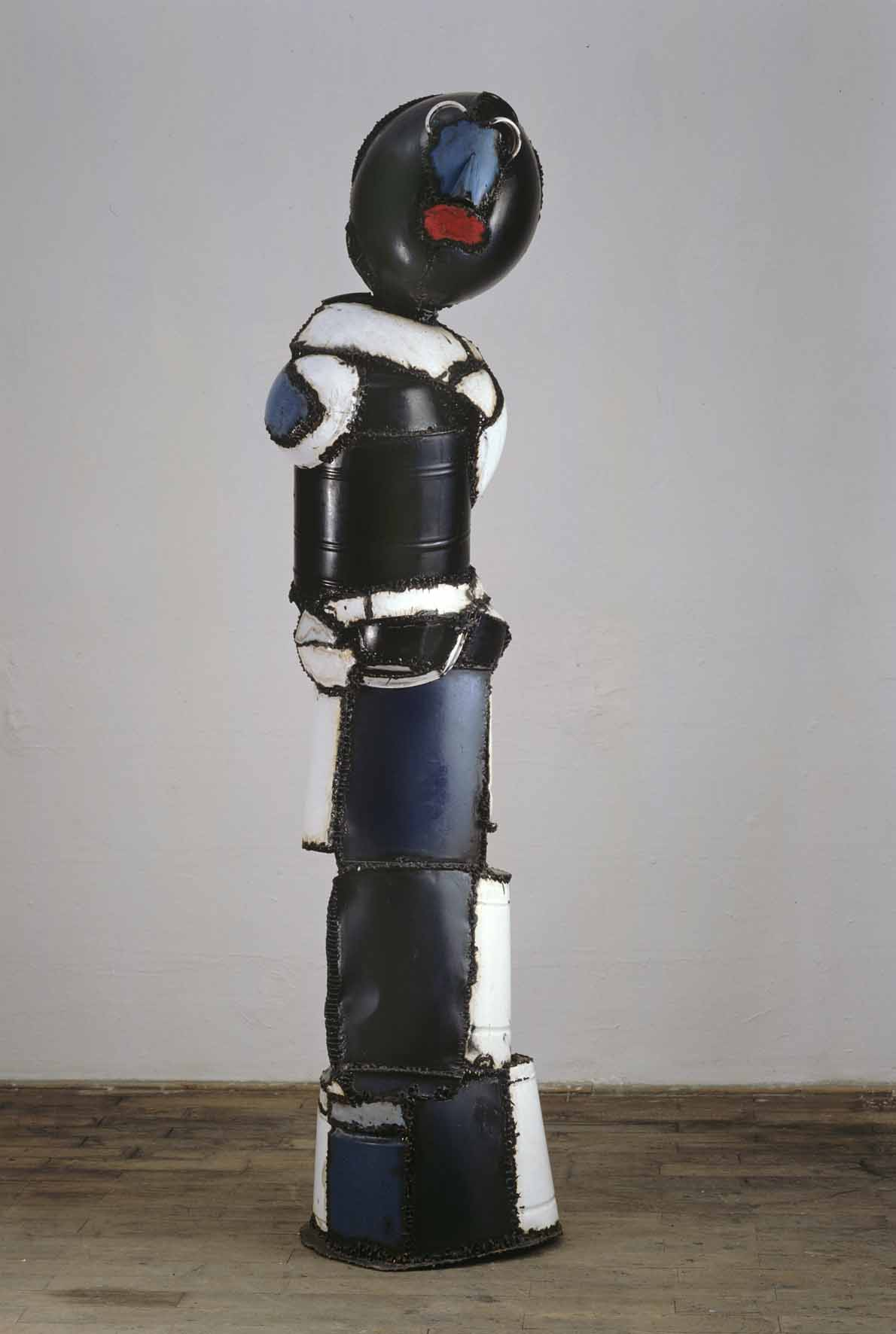
S-shaped Figure (1988), welded enamel, h. 175 cm

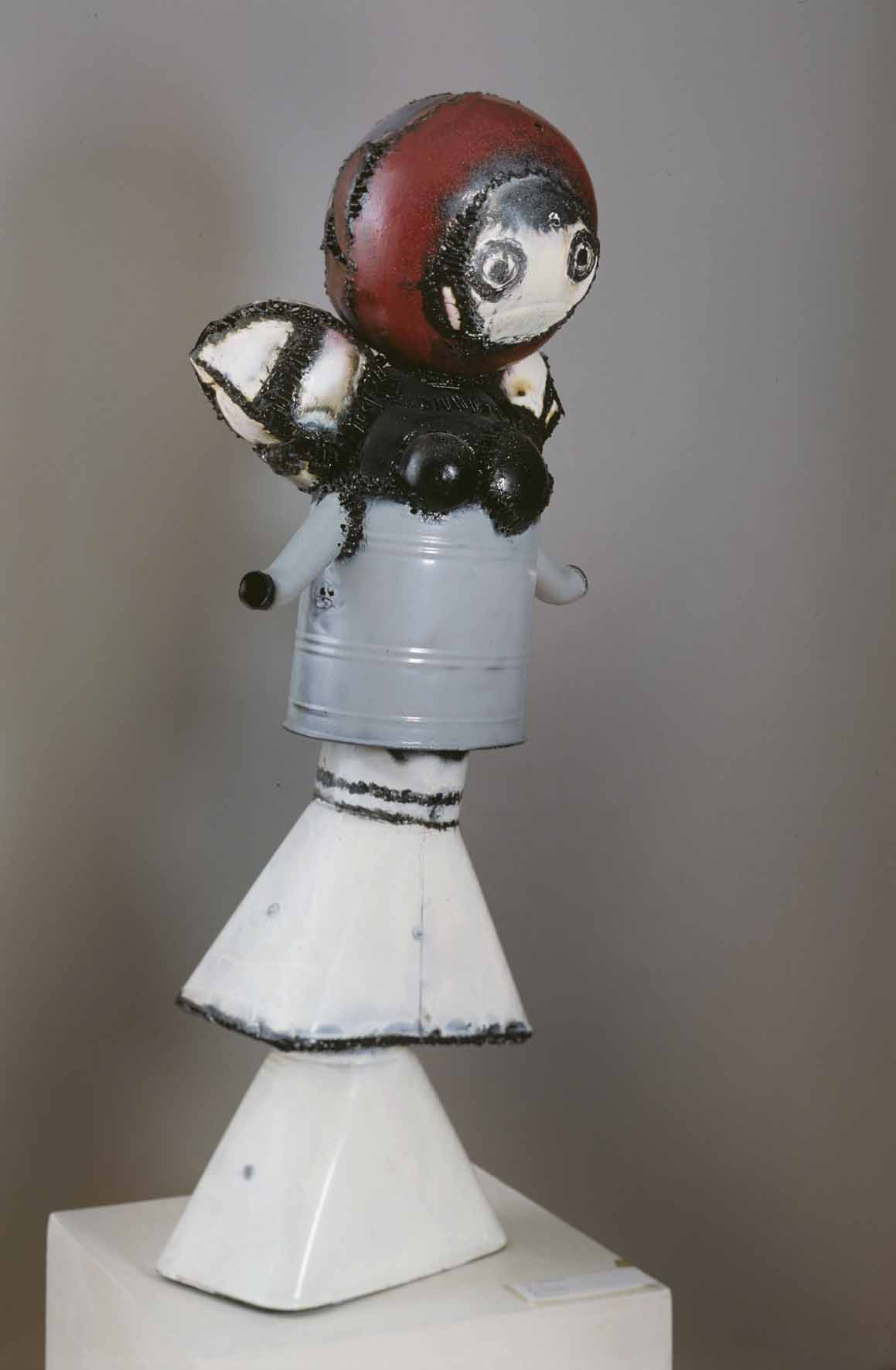
Surprised Cherub (1989-1990), welded enamel, h. 120 cm

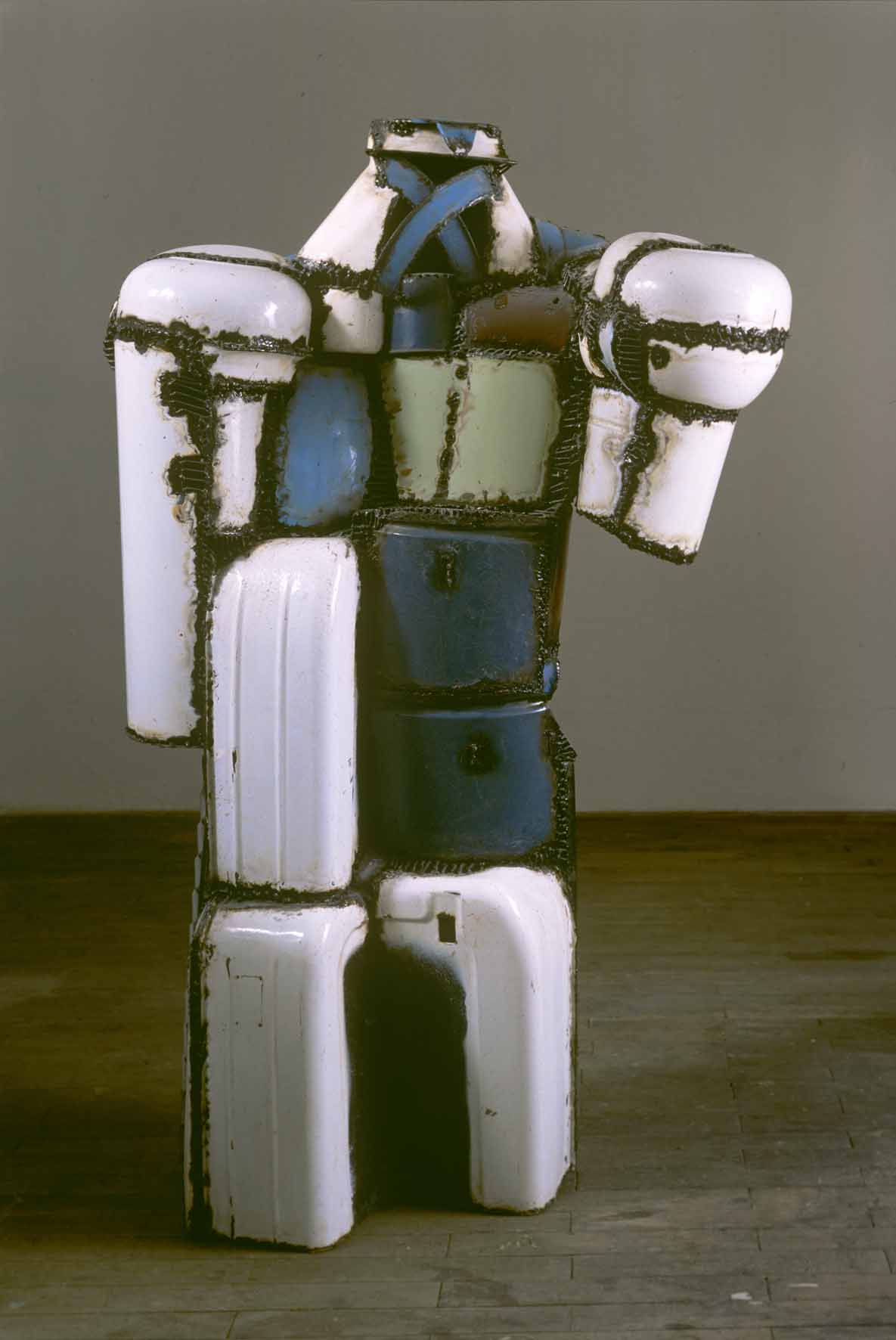
Garment (1990), welded enamel, h. 130 cm

Although the sculptures themselves are characterized by randomness and playfulness, improvisation with the material applied and often a certain incompleteness, leaving room for imagination, they are always serious works and the artist definitely refused to consciously create grotesque or humorous things. In the 1980s, her sculptures reflect a sense of life's hardship and anguish, and rather than merging, the joints of the pieces are scars – increasingly clear and disturbing traces of an attempt to bring life, fullness and unity back from the dead. Thus the existential feeling characteristic of life under the communist regime in the late 1950s and early 1960s returns.

A special part of her work consists of welded objects made of white enamelled sheet metal, where larger unstructured surfaces without emphasised detail act as a flat relief and are the counterpart of her collages (White Relief, 1984, Shirt, 1988, In the Bathroom).

Rare in her oeuvre are metal sculptures finished in bold red paint and assembled from scrap metal, sometimes reinforced with plaster and bandage (Red Head, 1970, Country Boy, 1980, Woman at the Machine, 1986, Winged Figure, 1986, Red Figure, 1994).

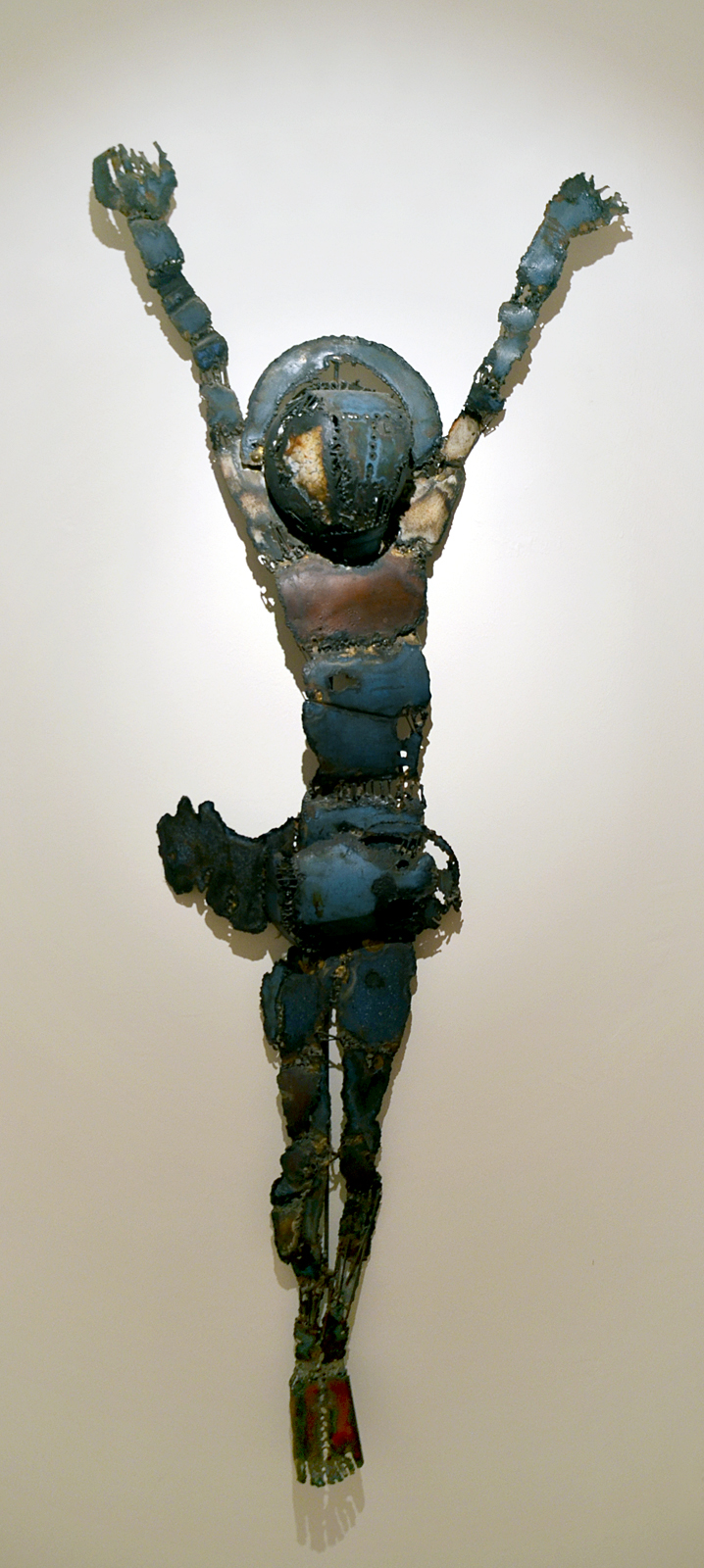
Crucifixion, Museum Kampa

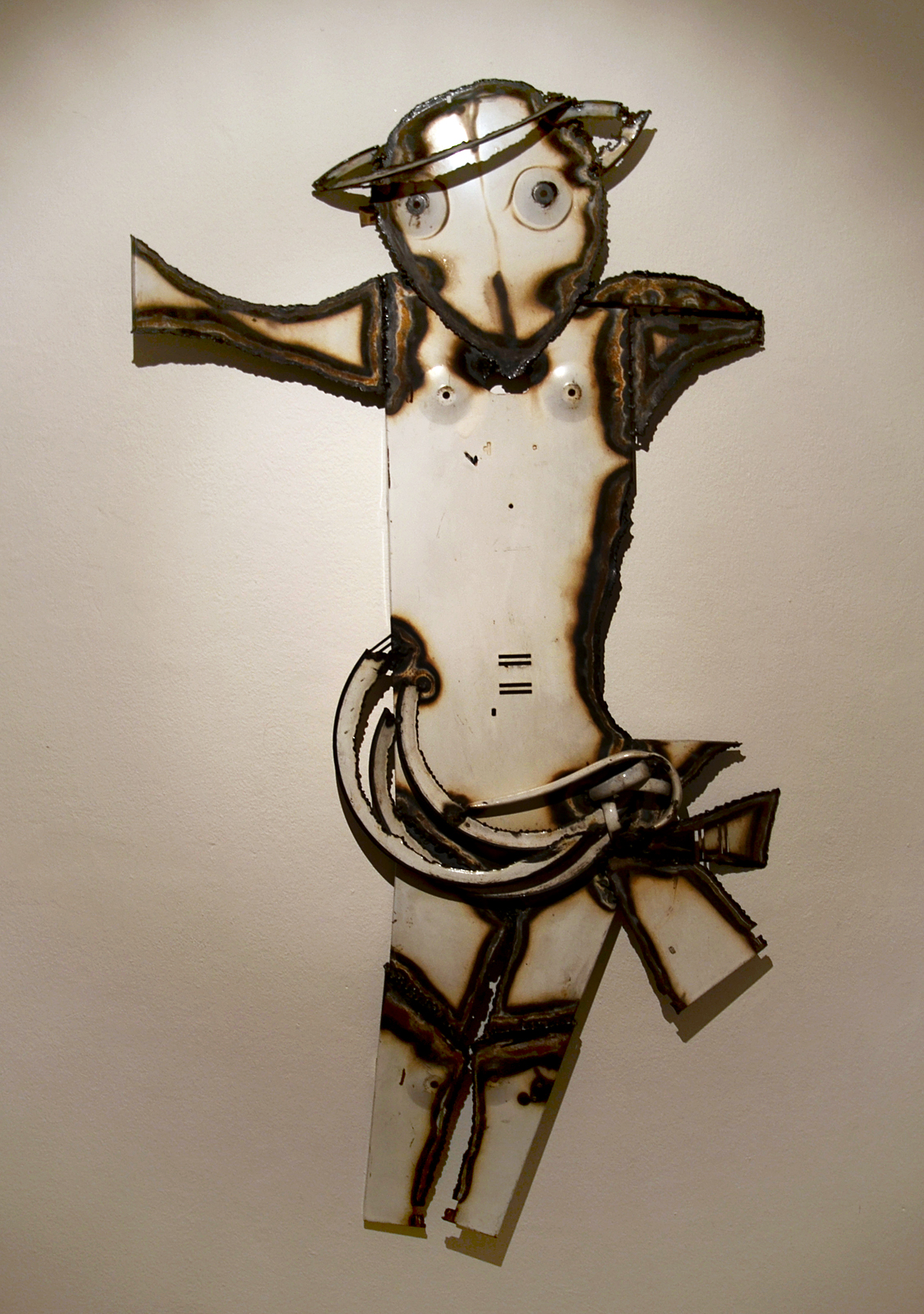
Christ from the Charles Square (1989-1990), Museum Kampa

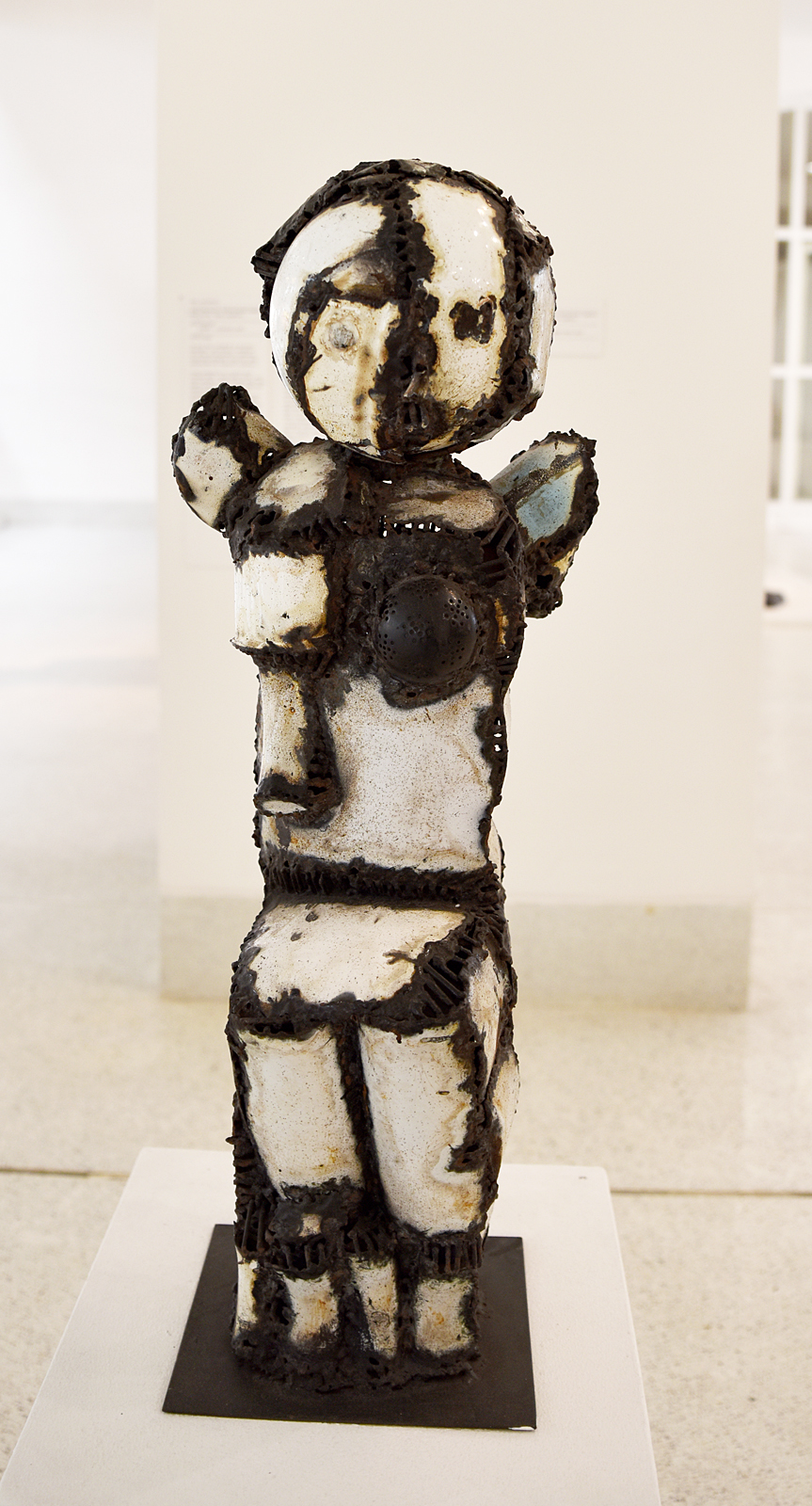
Angel (1976), National Gallery Prague

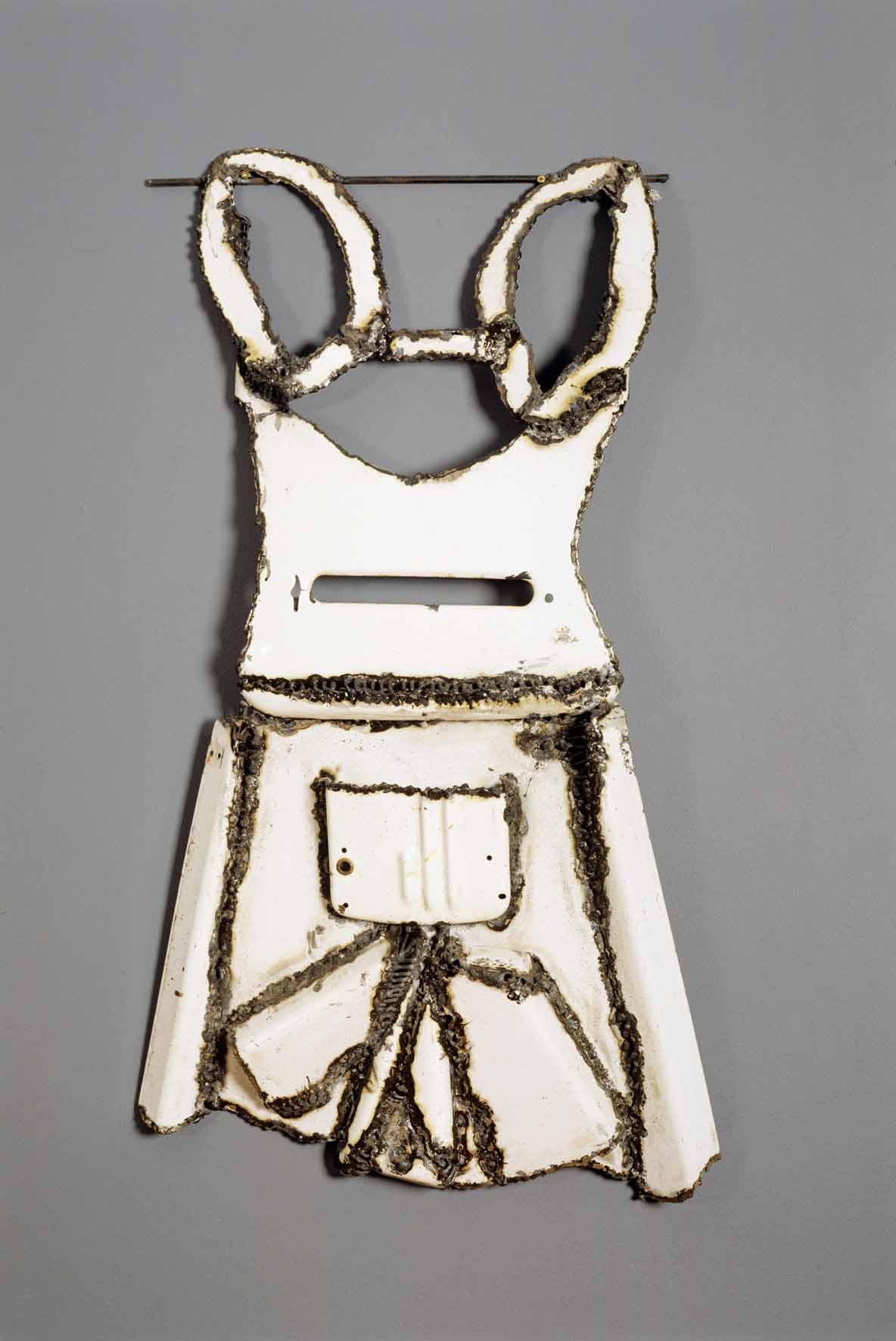
Shirt 2 (1988, 1995), welded enamel, h. 95 cm

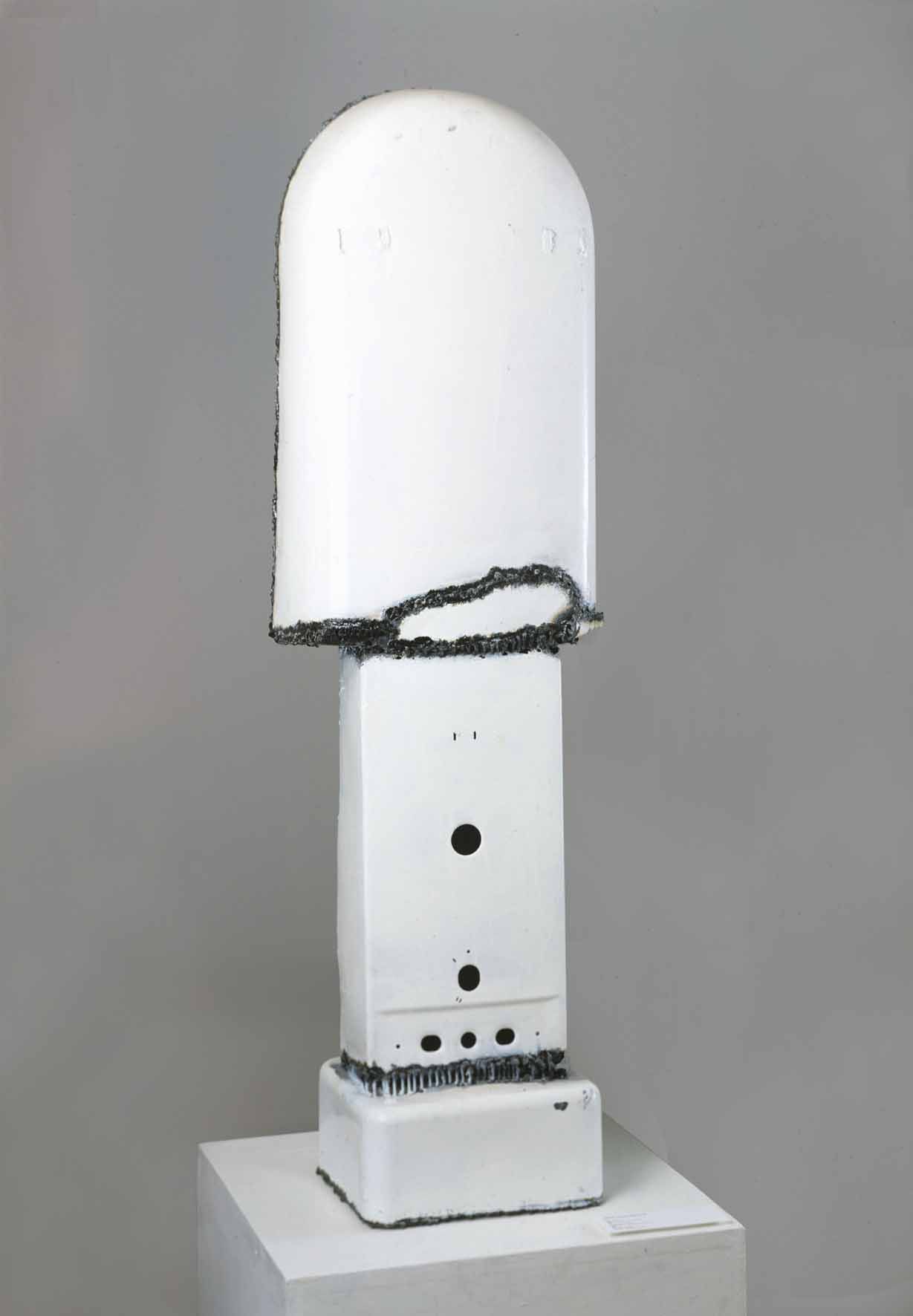
White totem (1980s), welded enamel, h. 124 cm

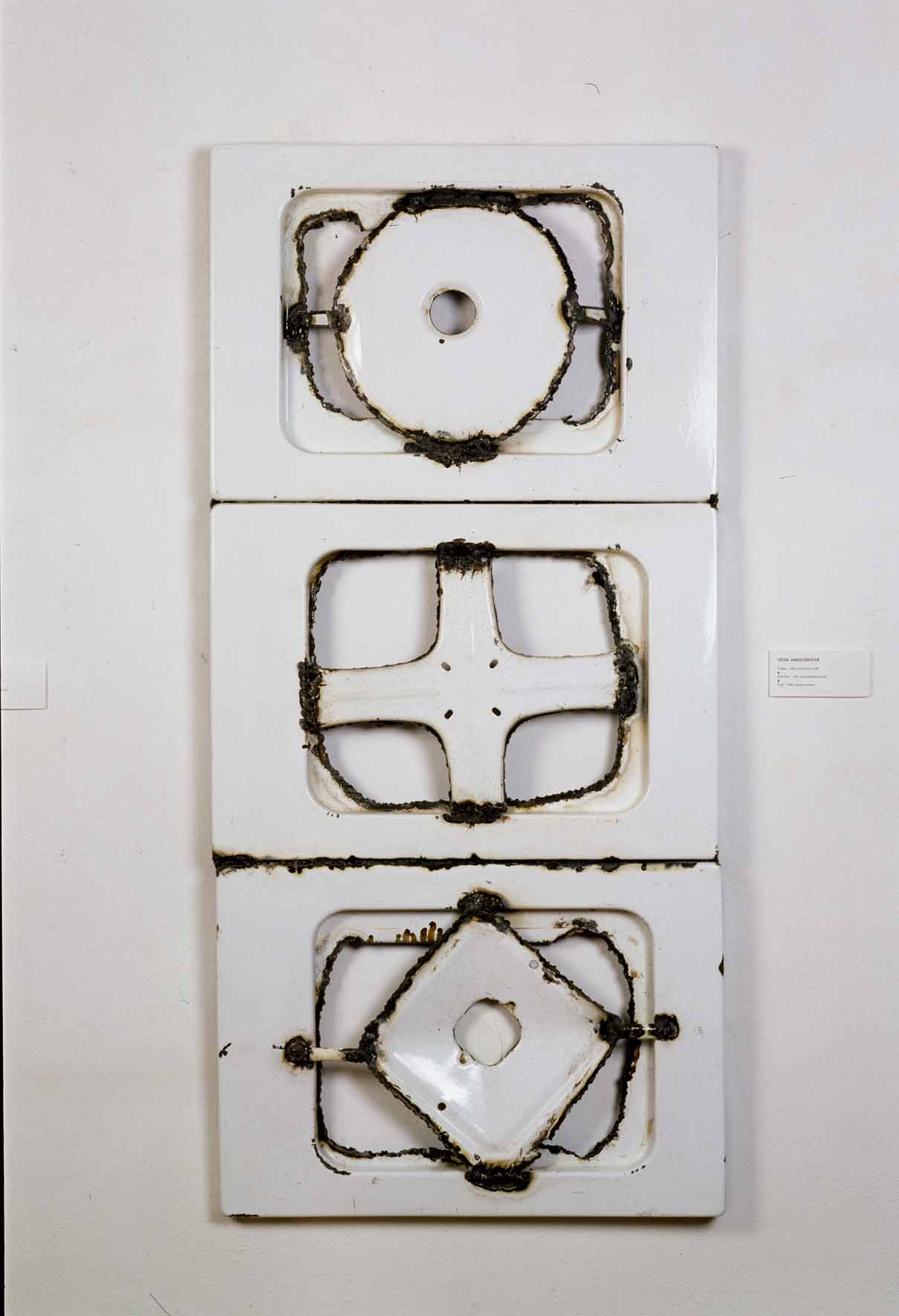
Signs (1989), welded enamel, h. 127 cm

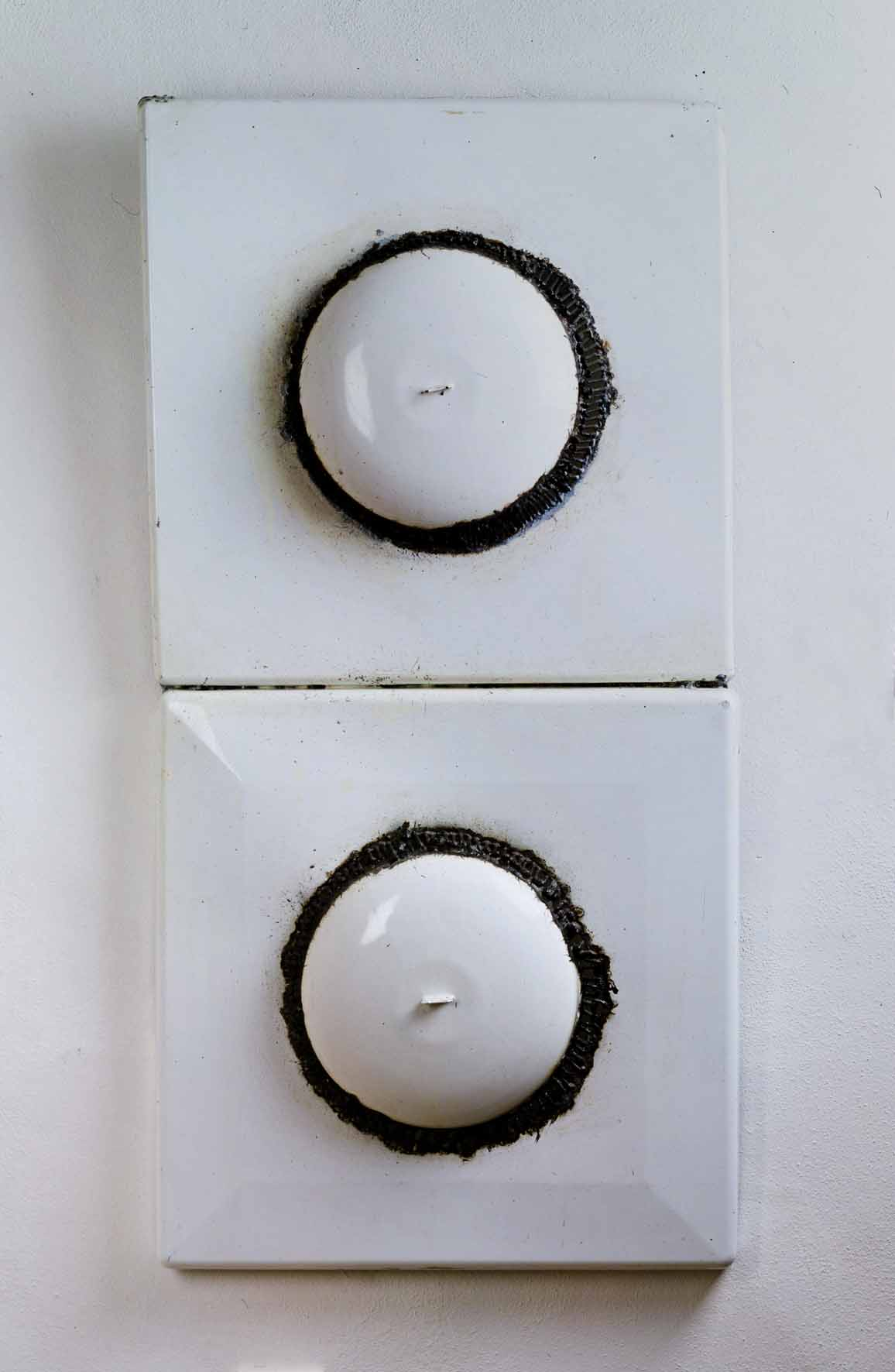
Secret (1991), welded enamel, h. 102 cm

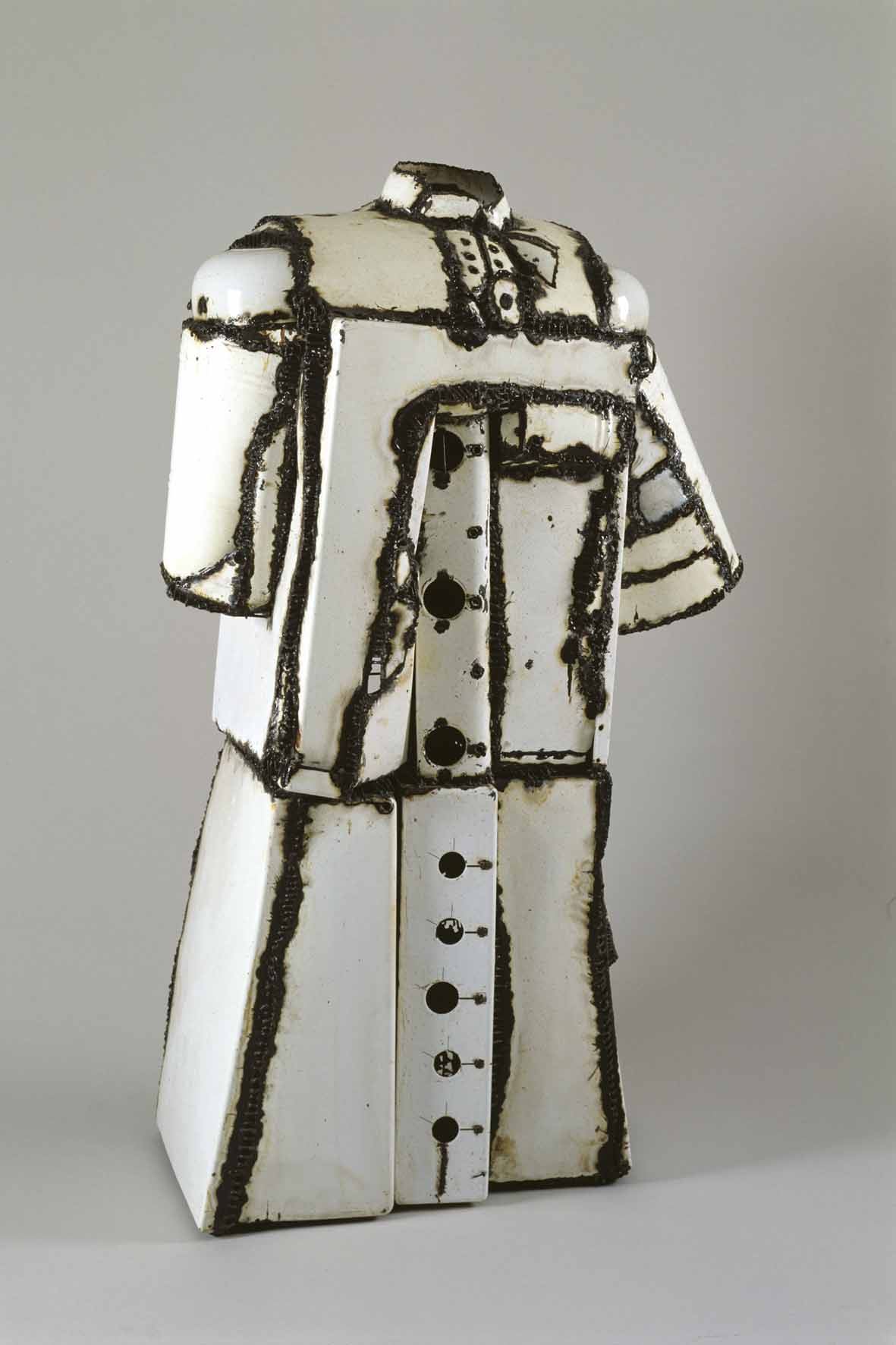
White Coat (1990-1992), welded enamel, h. 127 cm

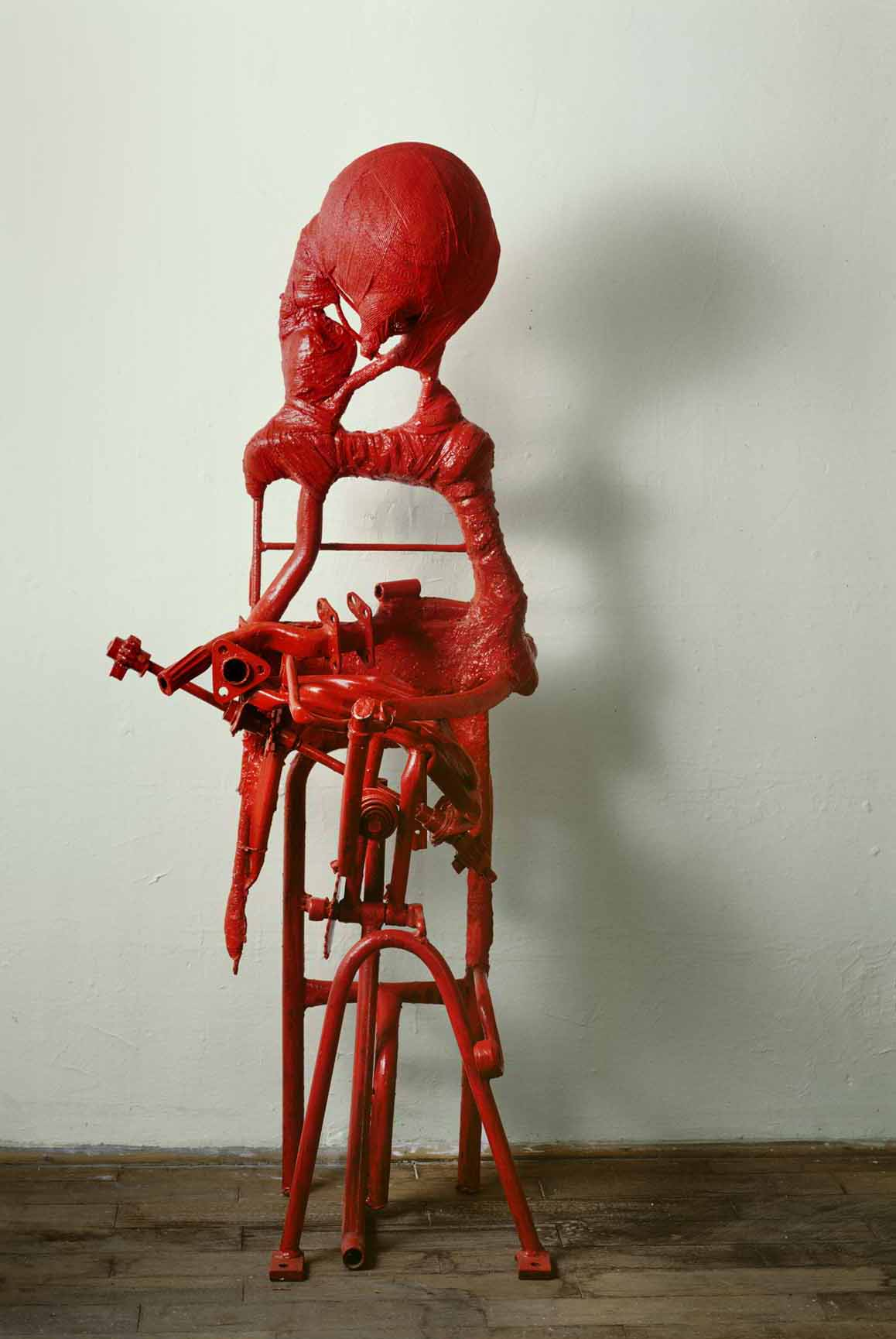
Woman at the Machine (1986)

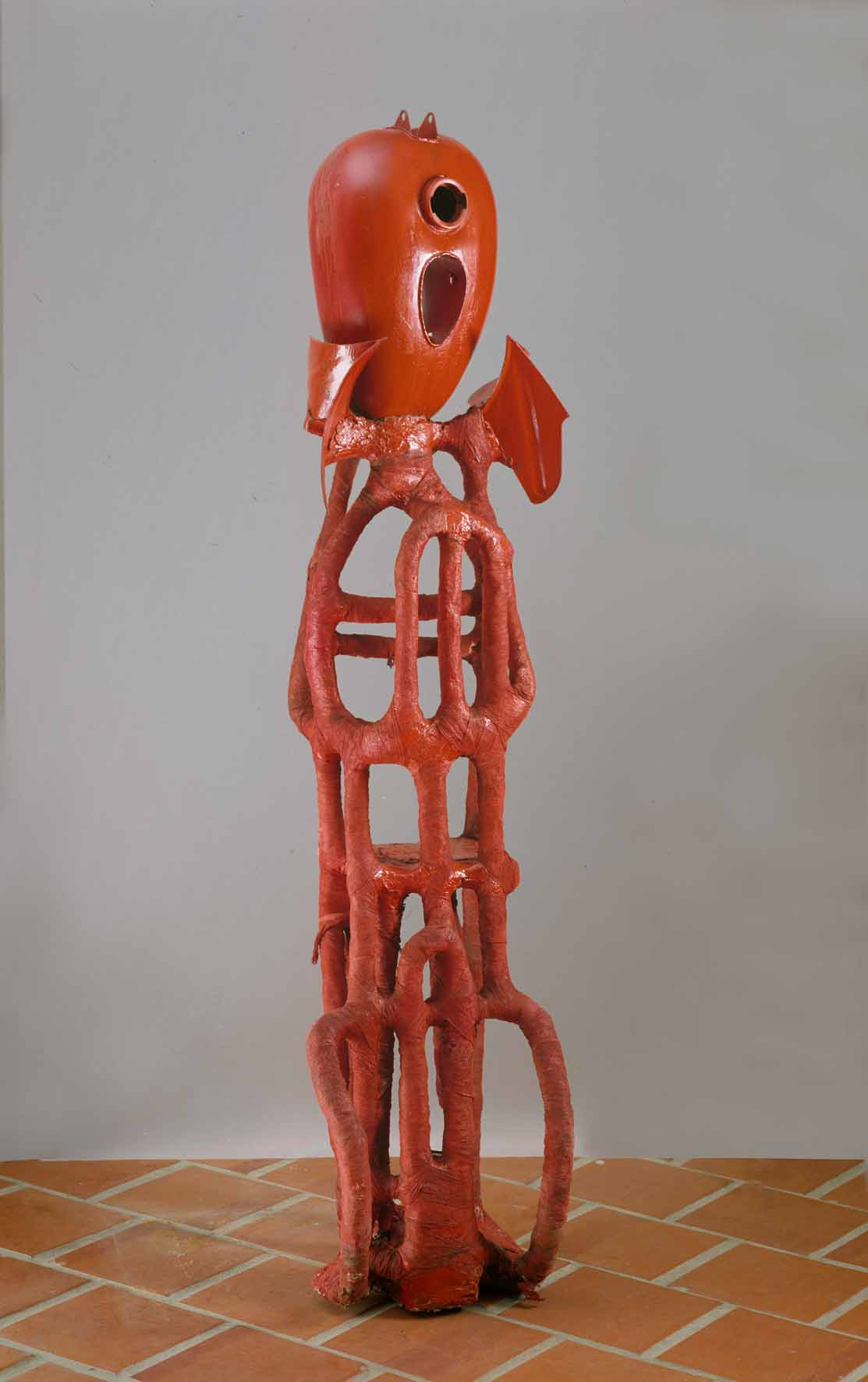
Red Figure (1994), mixed media, h. 178 cm

Věra Janoušková left one of the most original traces in Czech sculpture of the second half of the 20th century and her work is unique in a wider than just Czech context. Janoušková's significant place in the history of modern sculpture is also perceived abroad.

=== Paintings and collages ===
The first large-scale figurative collages, assembled from scraps of paper, date from the late 1950s ('Figure, Silhouette, 1959). The collaged images represent a distinctive part of Věra Janoušková's work, but they were probably created for lack of suitable sculptural material or time, as plastic pleated sculptures whose frontality was brought to conclusion. After the soviet occupation in 1968, the loss of opportunities to exhibit, and the forced retreat into seclusion of both spouses, Věra Janoušková temporarily devoted herself mostly to works on paper.

From the 1970s until 2010, figurative paper collages have been an original and important part of Věra Janoušková's work. They were preceded by the inspiring exhibition Collage in Czech Art (Gallery in Havlíčkův Brod, 1969) and acquaintance with works of Kurt Schwitters, but the immediate reason was fatigue and urge to break away from sculpture and try something else. Her need for a sculptural form persisted and Janoušková has used a combination of various techniques in their creation, including frottage, burning, tearing and drawing, layering or crumpling scraps of paper to form a low relief. In the artist's words, "technically it is collage, but the project is sculpture". Although she abandons drawing for a time, she intervenes in the collages with pencil and brush to emphasize a new meaning. The colourfulness of the collages represents a subconscious desire to paint. Several asbestos cement figurative sculptures with a surface covered with paper collage and drawing were also made at this time (Pasted Torso, 1971, Pasted Body, 1972). Janoušková modelled the figures not as independent works, but only as a structural basis for collages. The parts drawn or cut out of paper look like what is actually left of the figure, while the base remains only a kind of illusion of the real body.

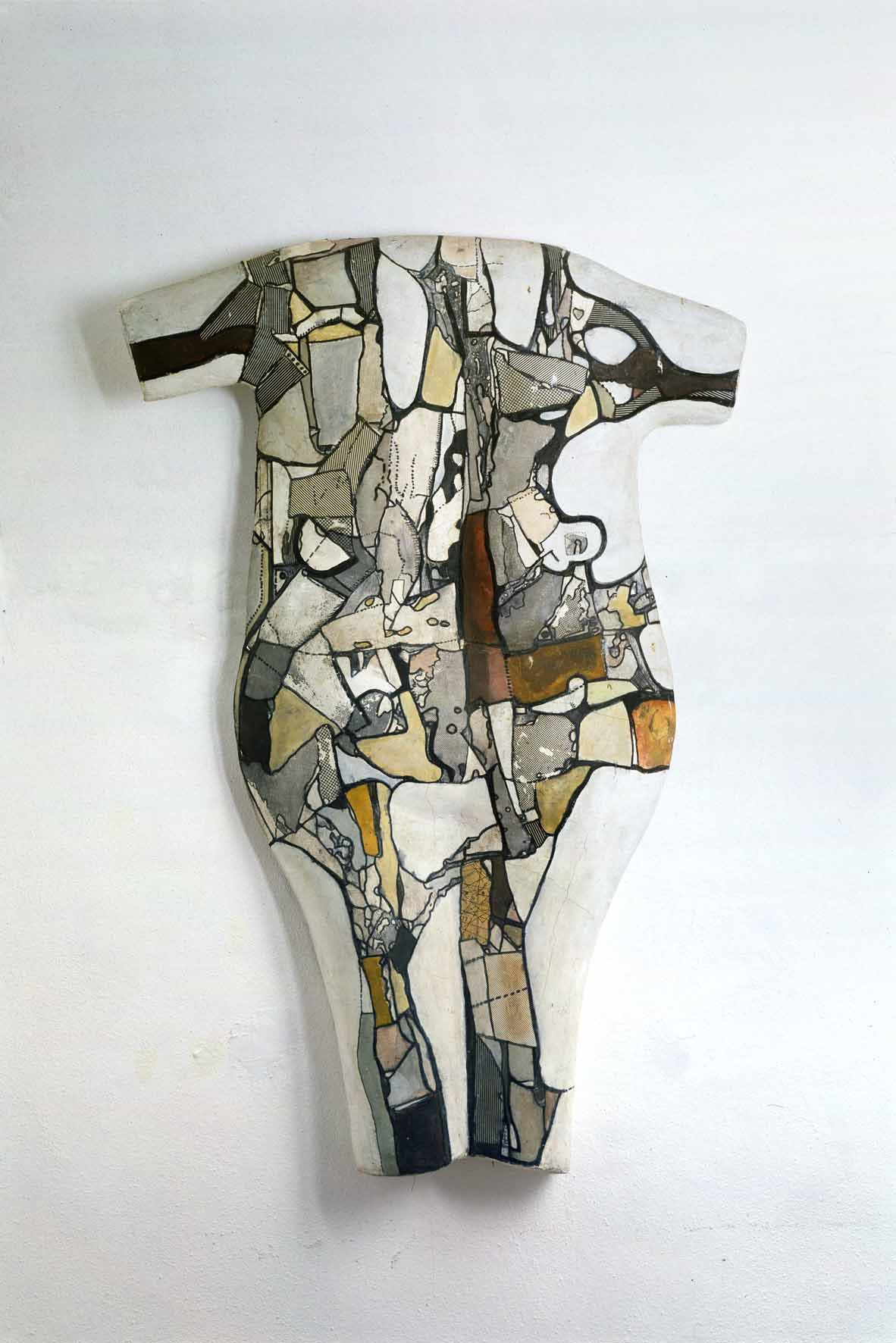
Pasted Body (1972), mixed media, h. 111 cm

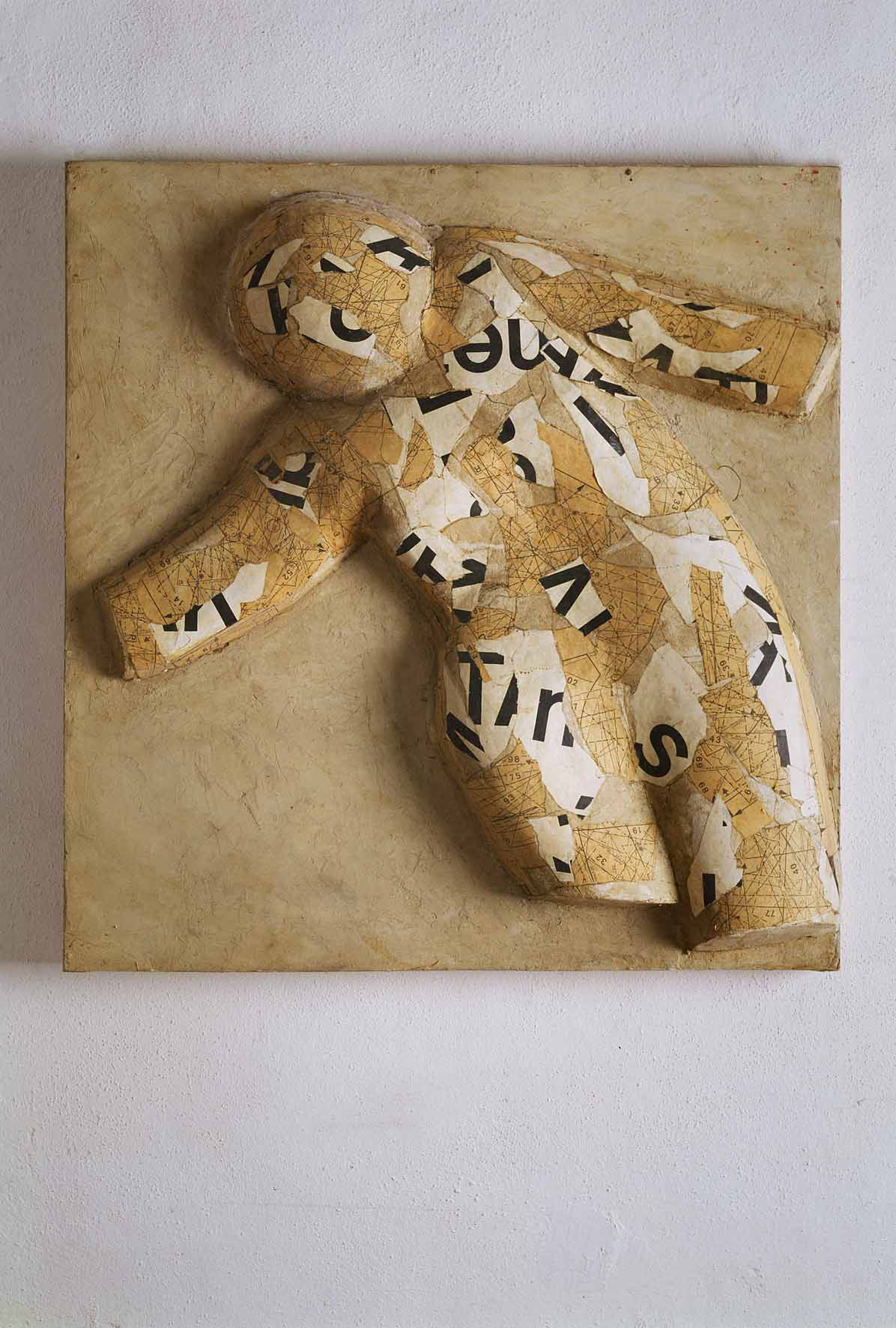
Pasted Body 3 (1972-1974), mixed media 63 x 63 cm

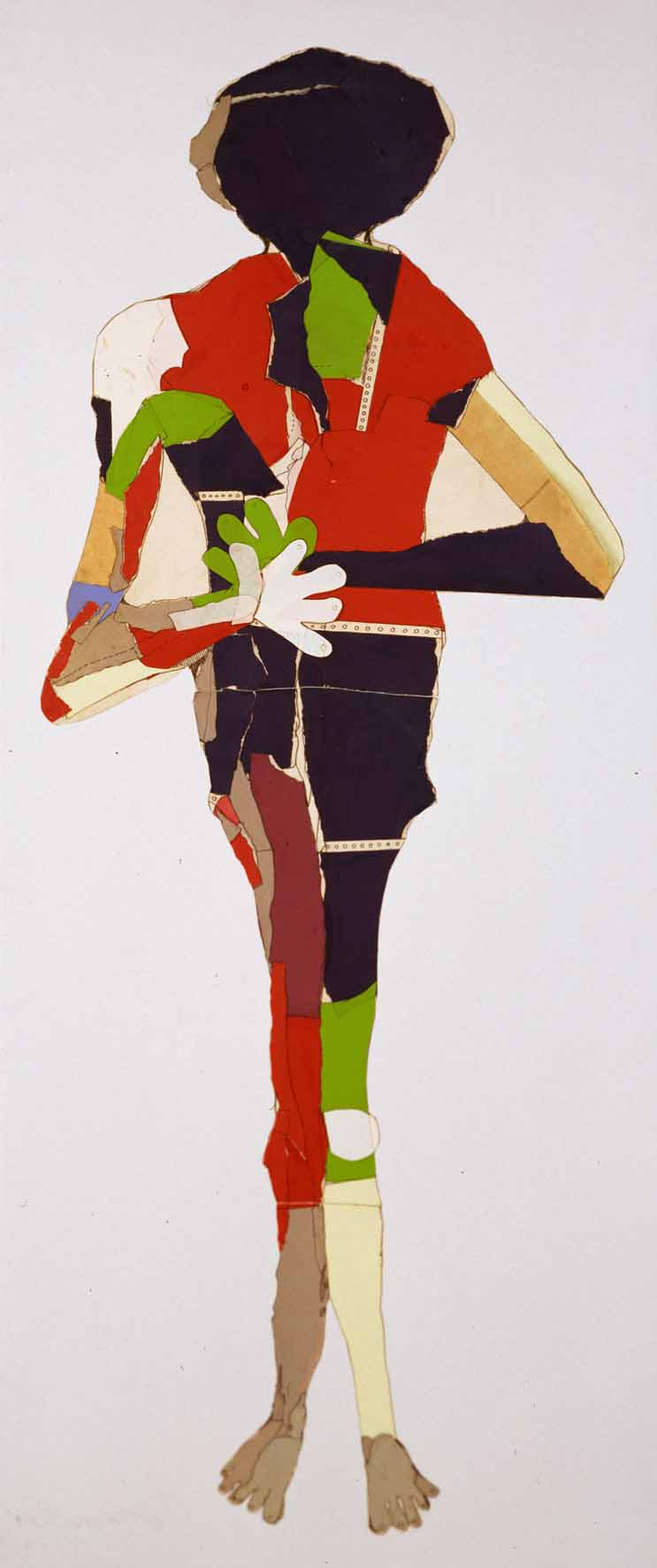
Figure (1974), collage on canvas, h. 220 cm

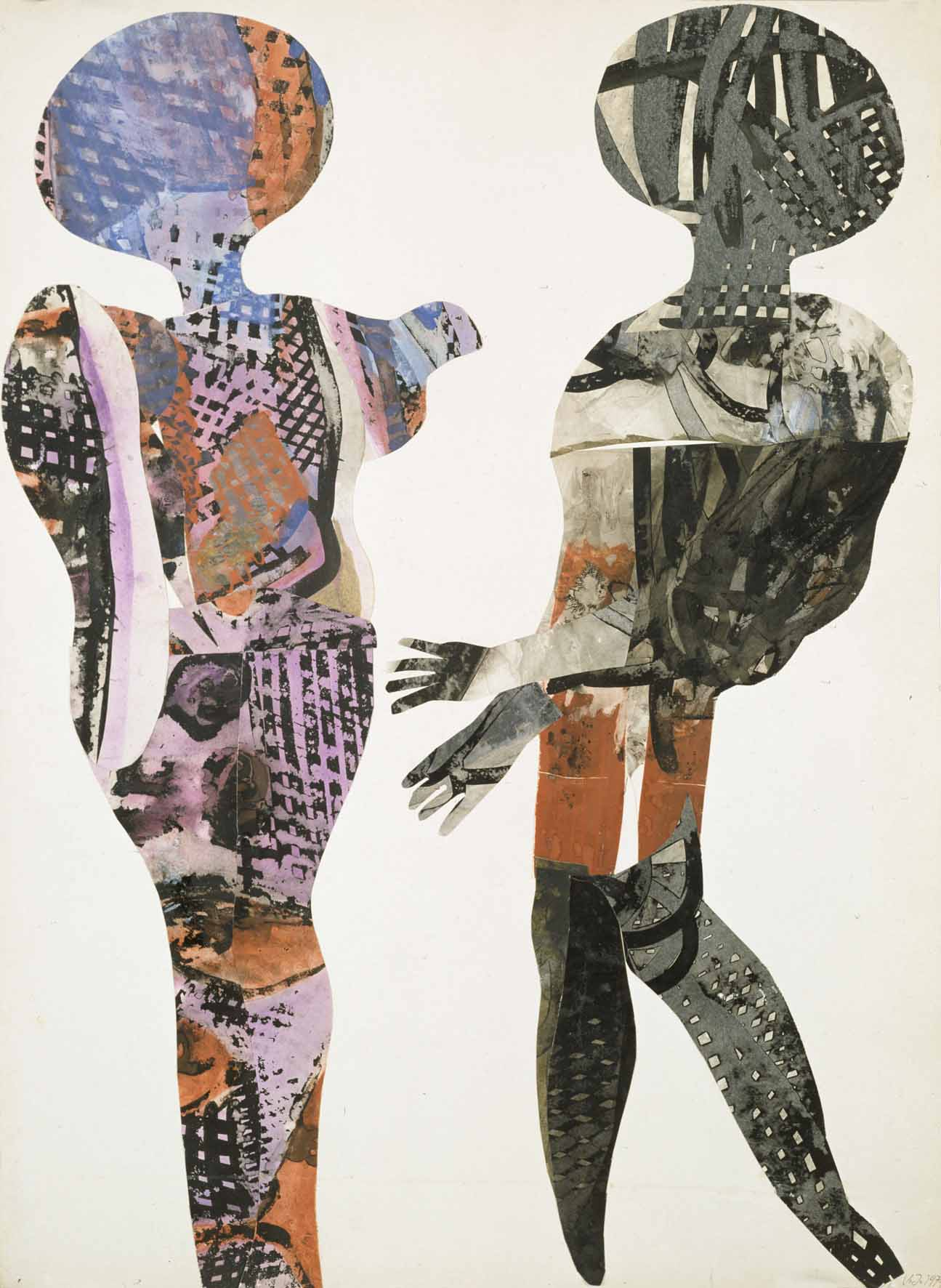
Collage (1977), 90 x 66 cm

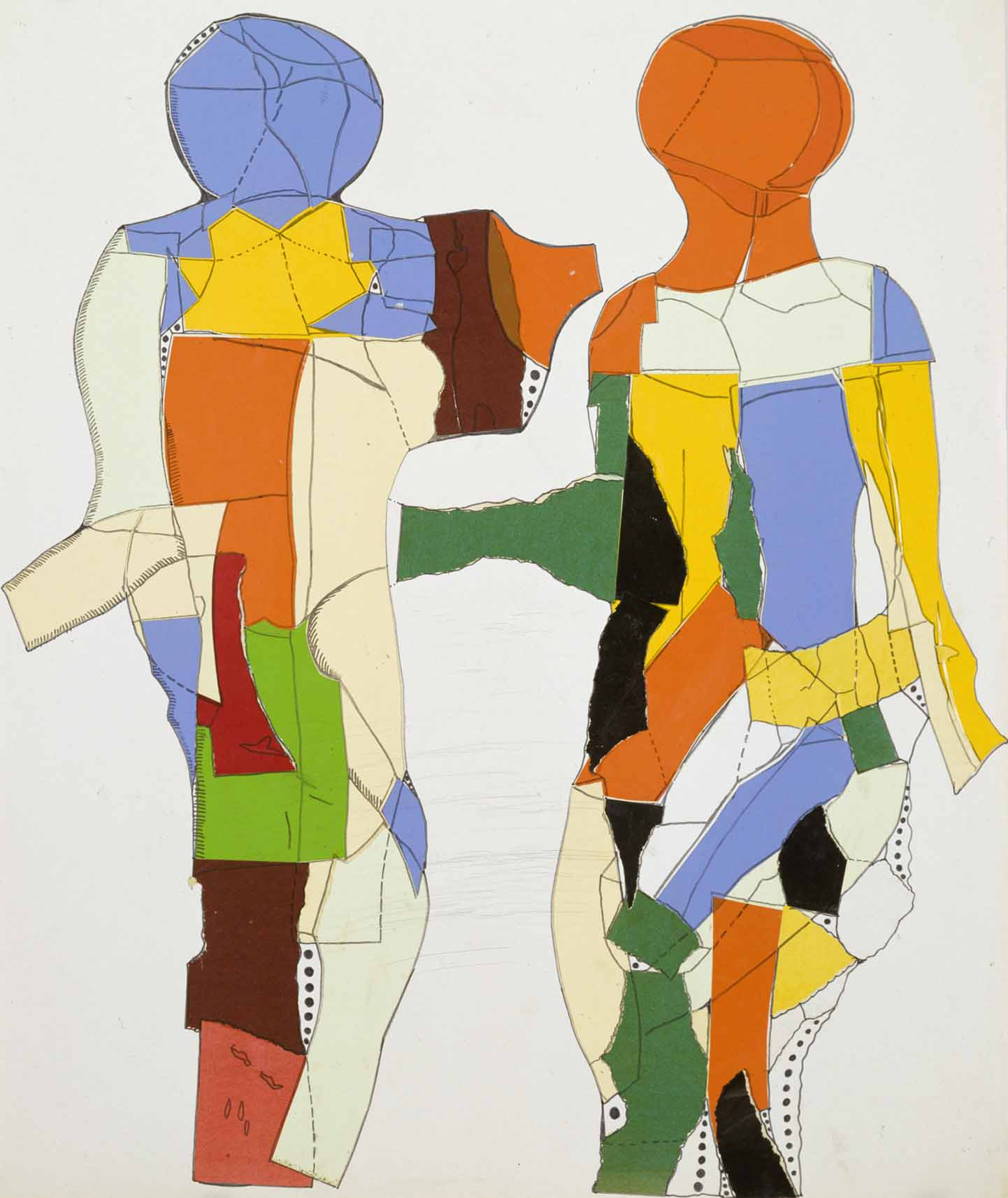
Collage (1977), 90 x 75 cm

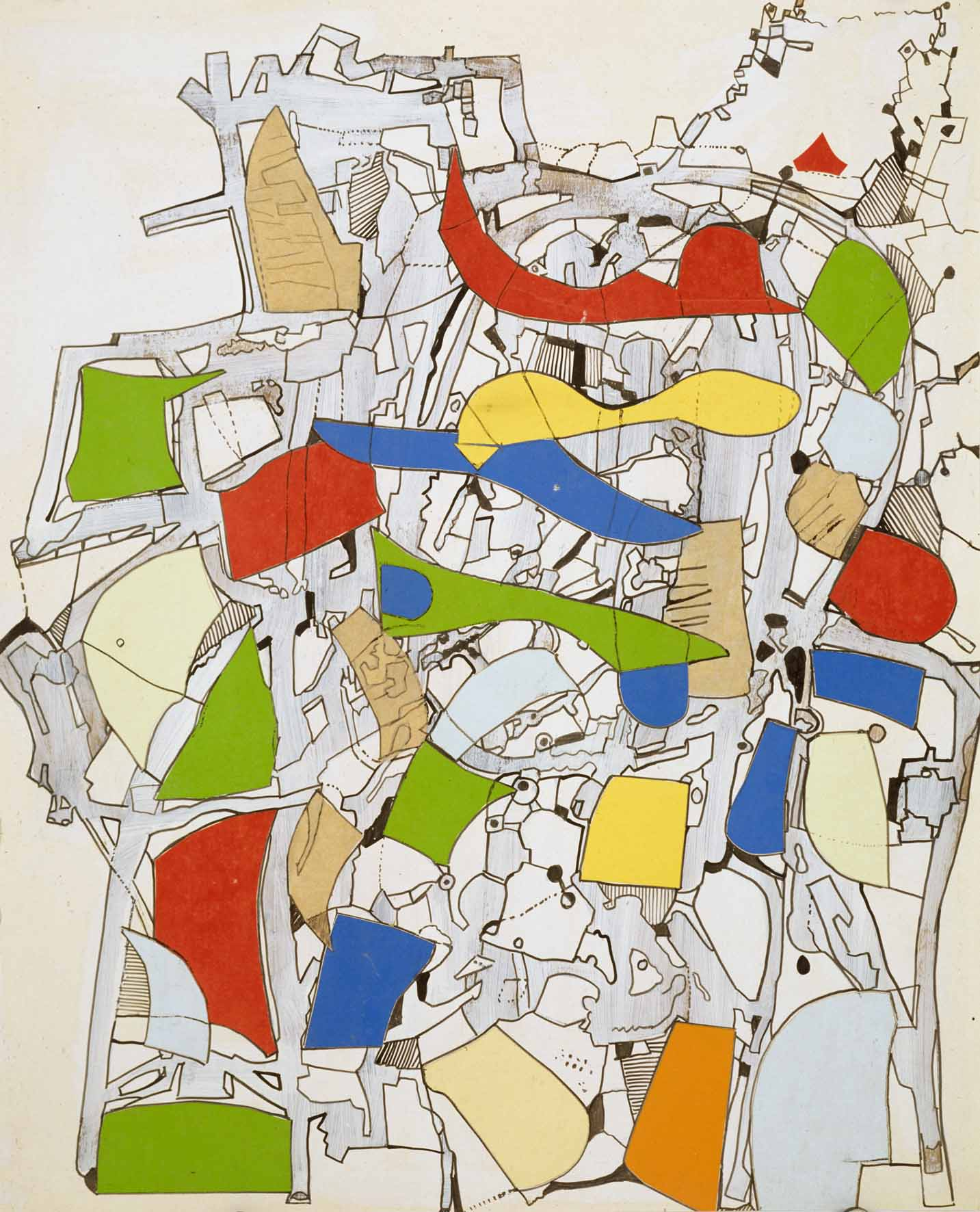
Collage (1978), 85 x 70 cm

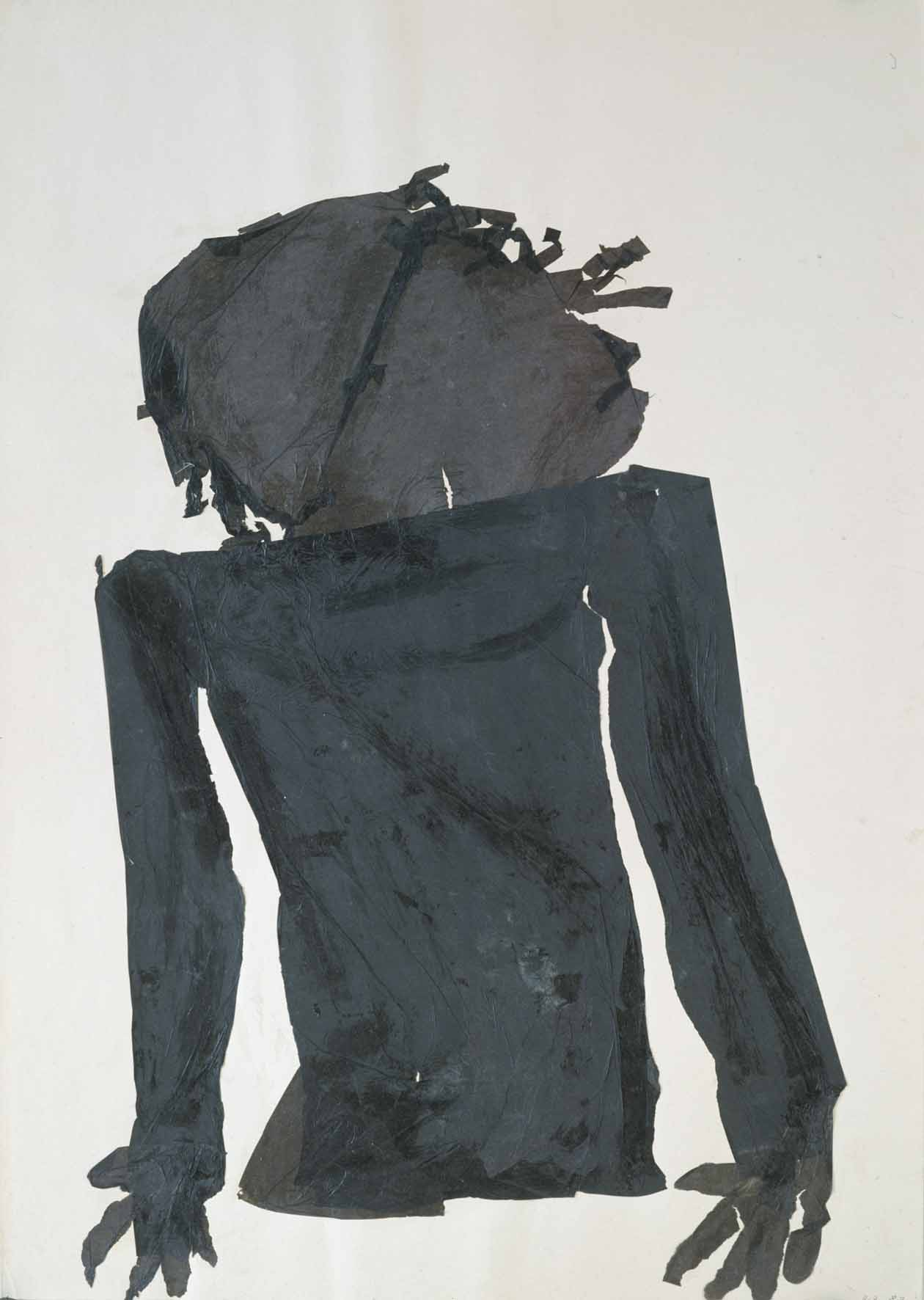
Collage (1982), 84 x 59 cm

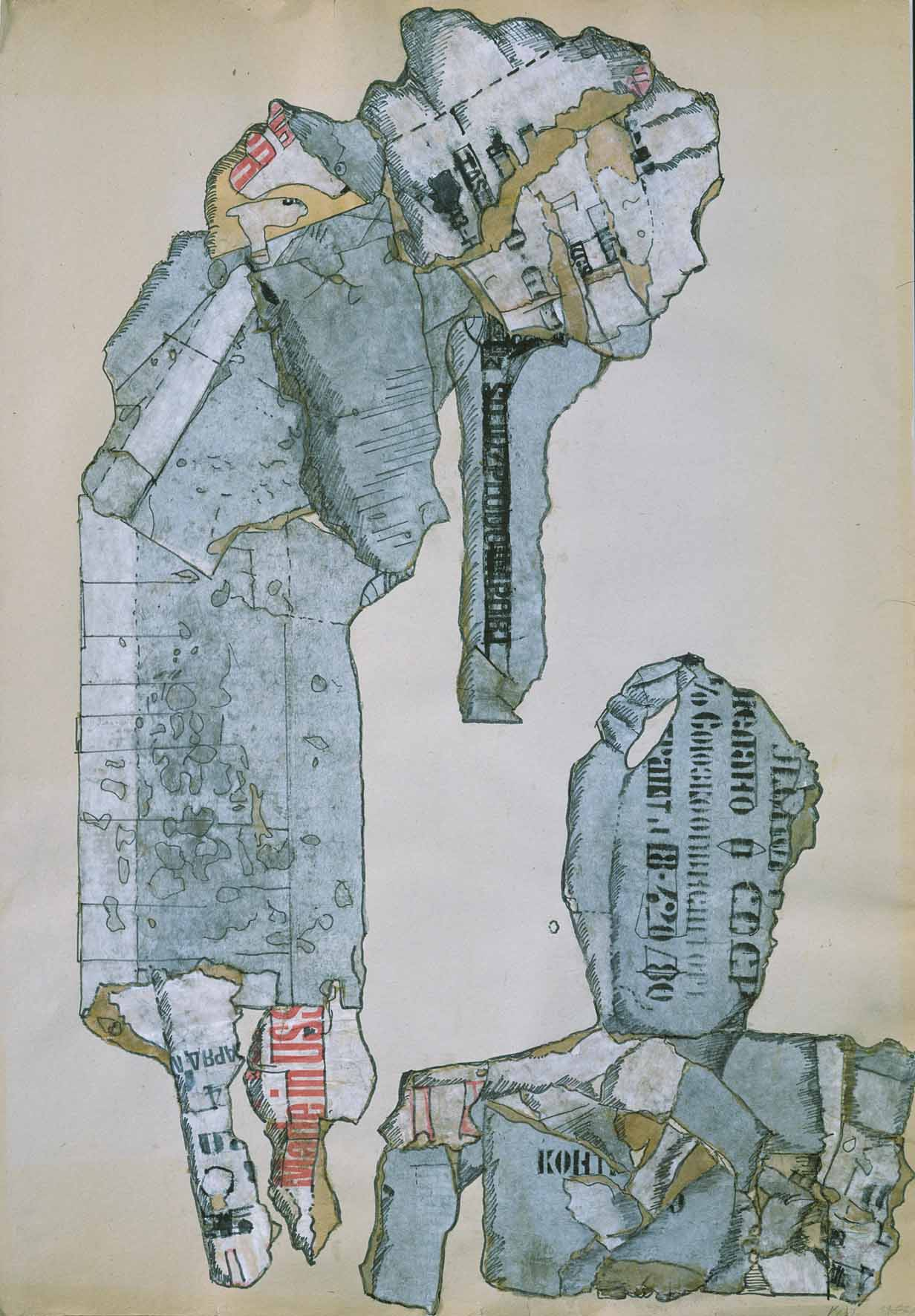
Collage (1982)

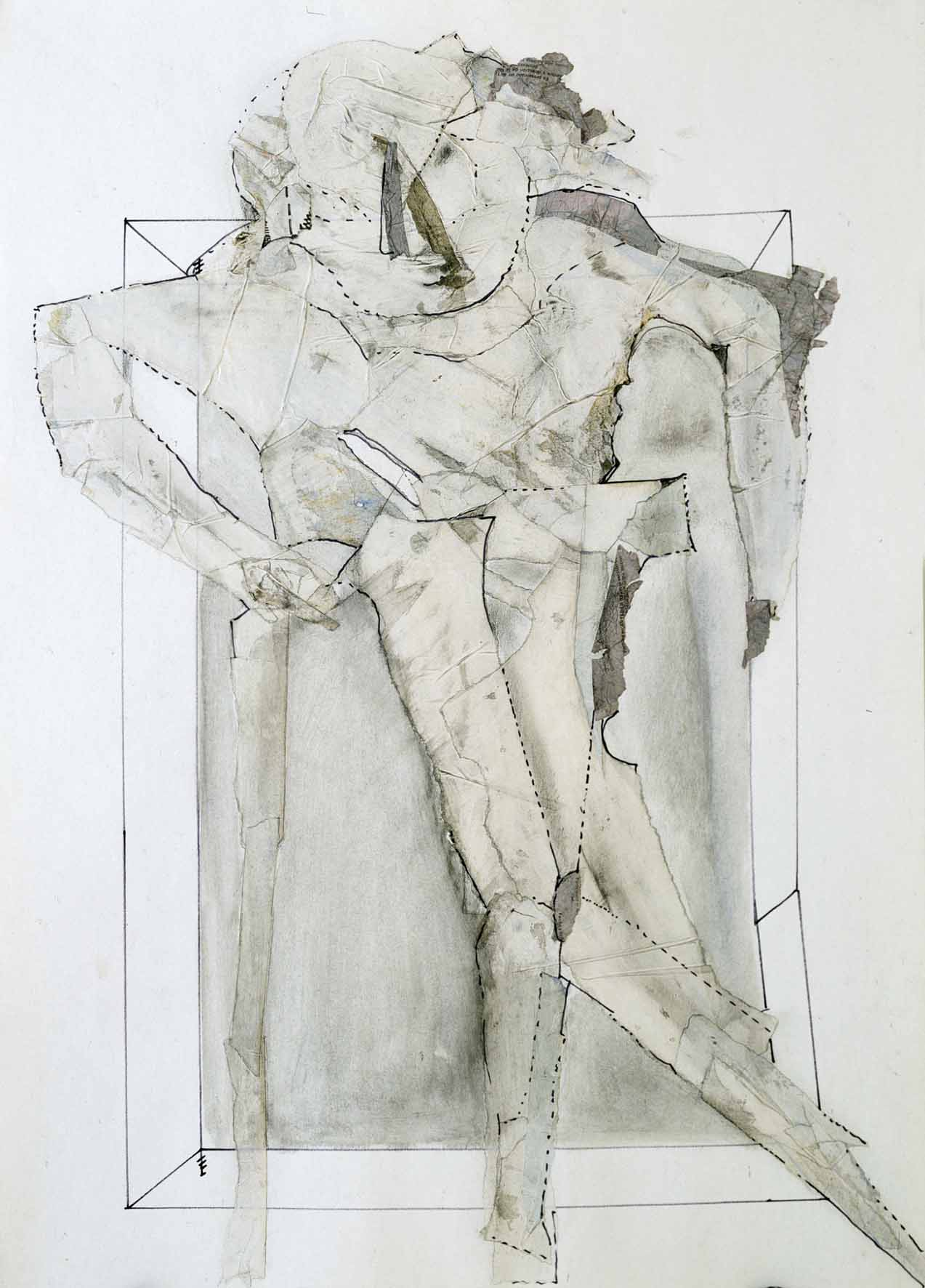
Collage (1982), 84 x 60 cm

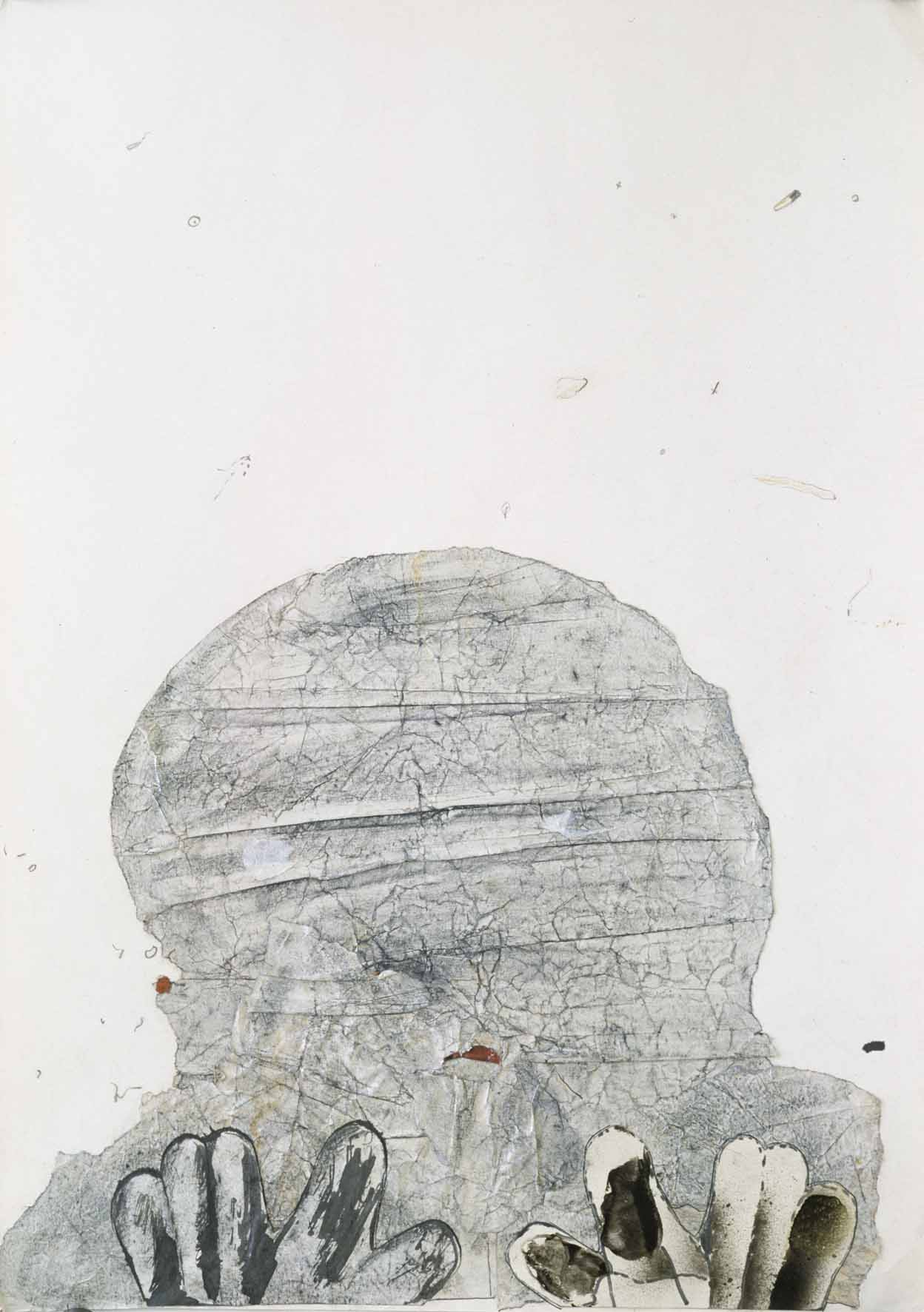
Collage (1984), 60 x 40 cm

She looks for inspiration in found materials and counts on the element of chance, but her theme is almost exclusively the human story in its various forms. These are often tragicomic characters who become a kind of social moral. For her collages, she uses papers torn from poster boards in Prague and before that in Paris, where she often faced harsh criticism from passers-by, colour magazines, old tailor's patterns and transparent tissue paper, or school blackboards and reproductions stored in the attic of the school in Vidonice, where the Janoušek couple had set up their studio. Most of her collages are characterised by strong colour, as are her enamel sculptures, but in a personal crisis after her husband's death she only made gloomy monochrome collages – grey shadows (Shadow, 1986). She returned to her former colourfulness in the 1990s.

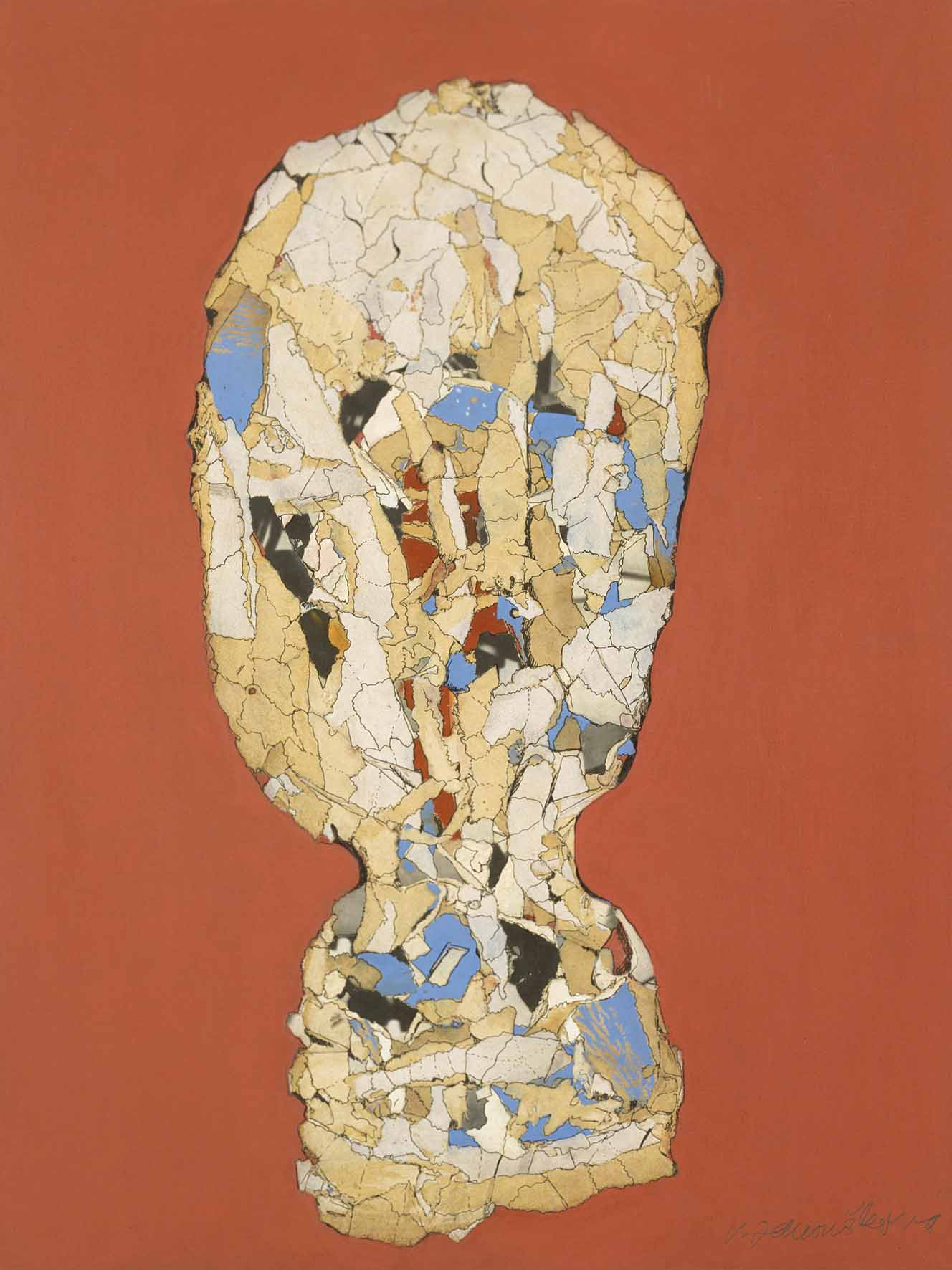
Head (1962), mixed media, 61 x 45

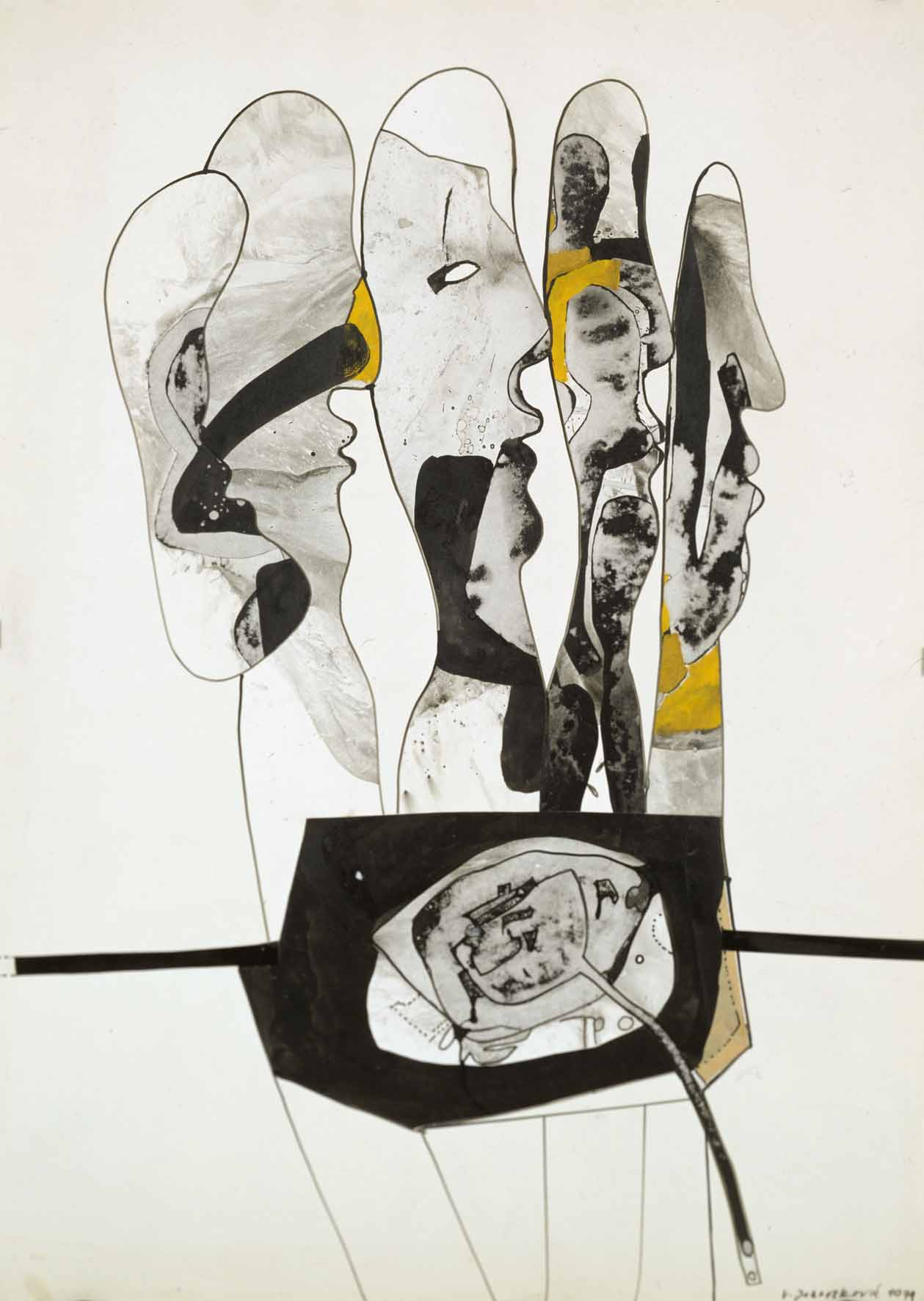
Collage (1971), 88 x 62 cm

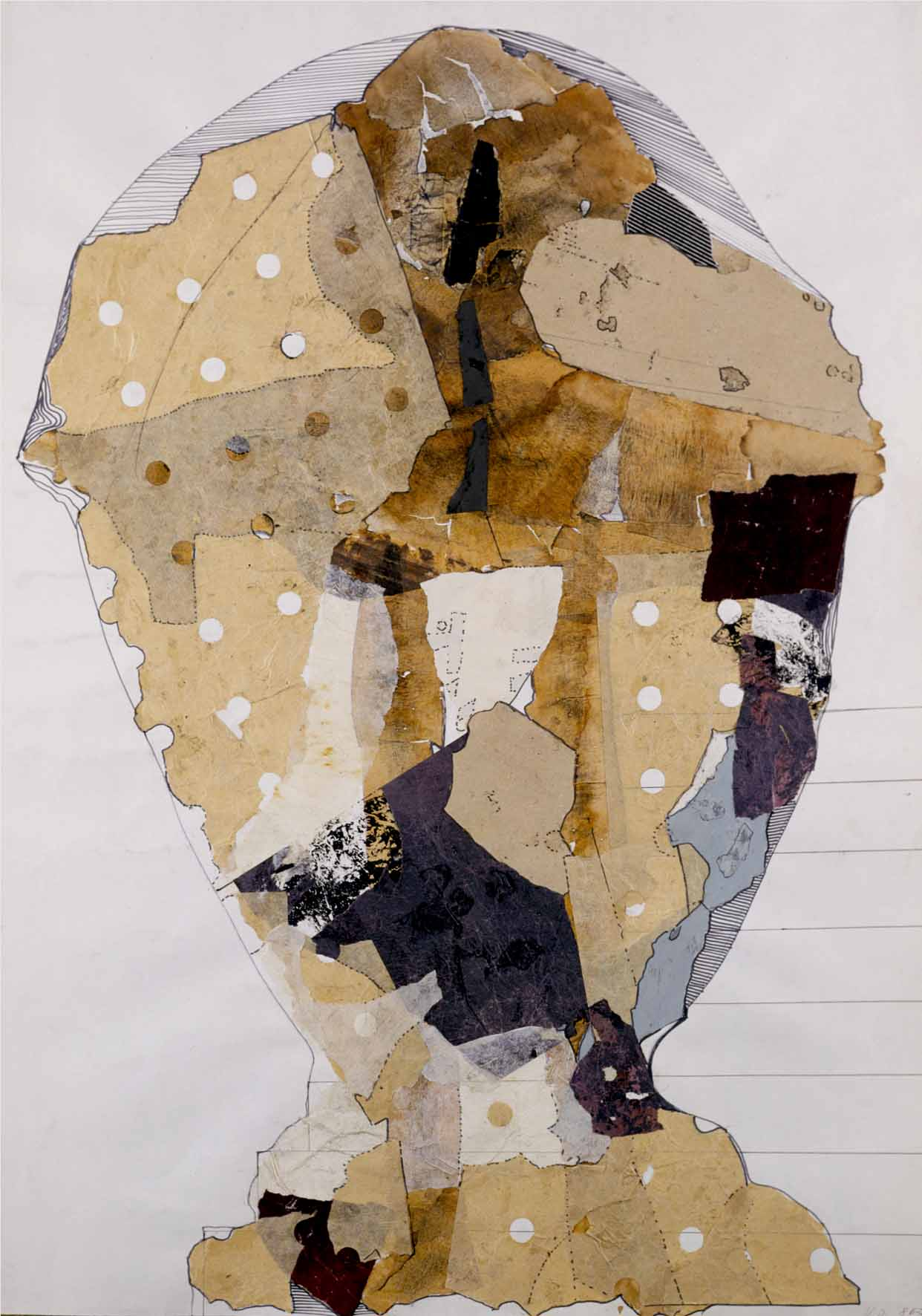
Head (1986-1987), collage 88 x 62 cm

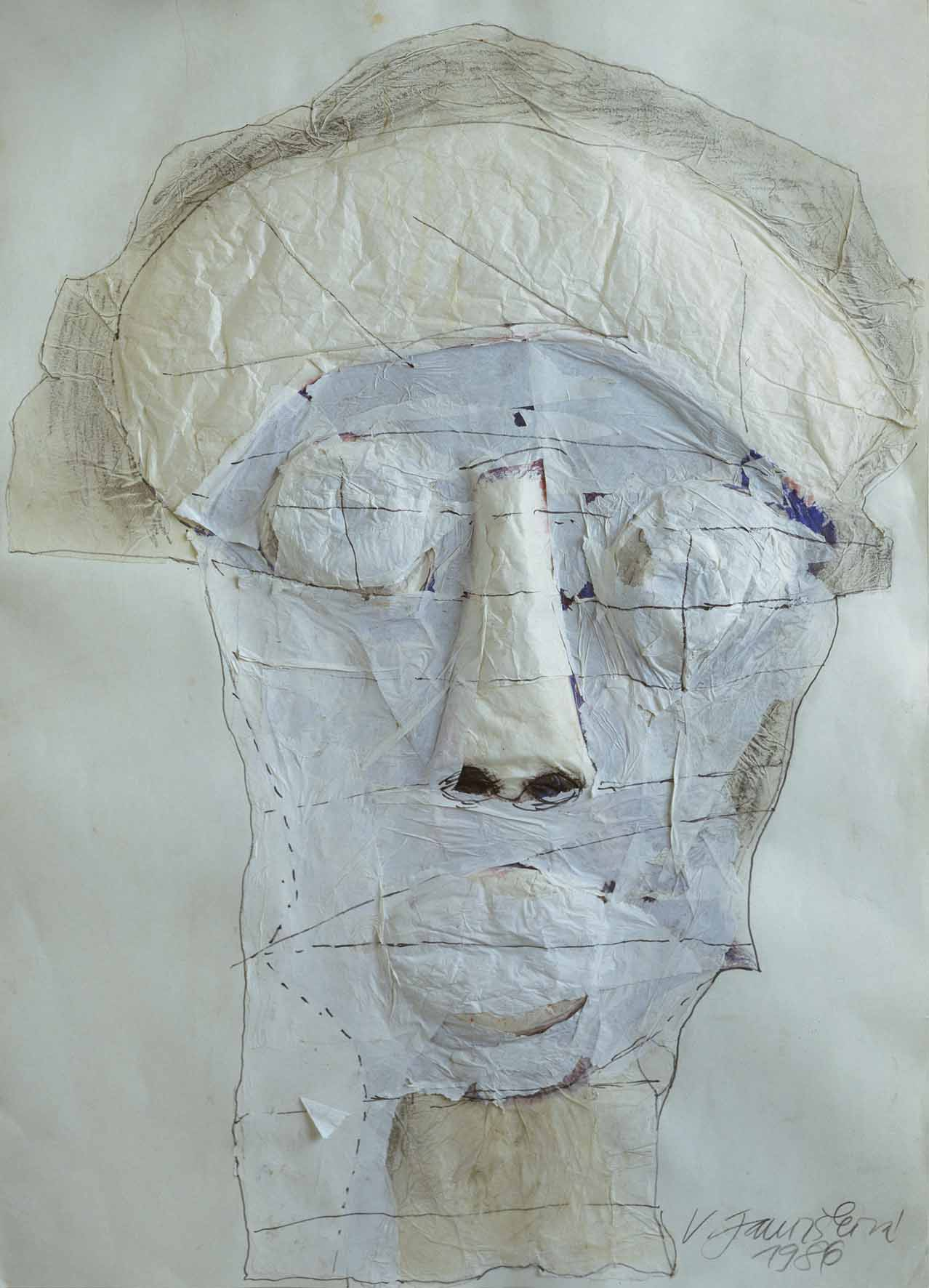
Head (1986), collage 60 x 40 cm

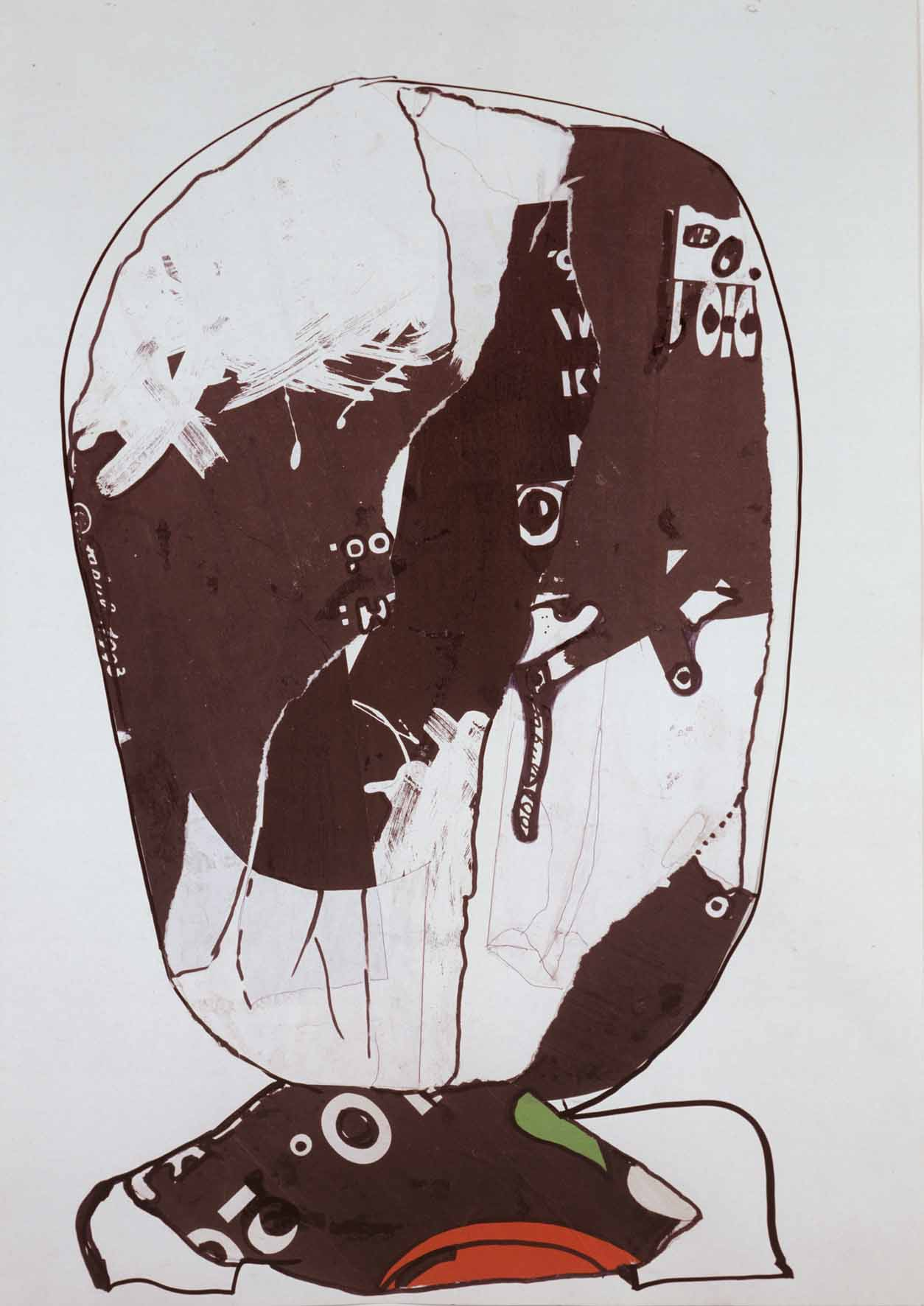
Collage (1993), 68 x 48 cm

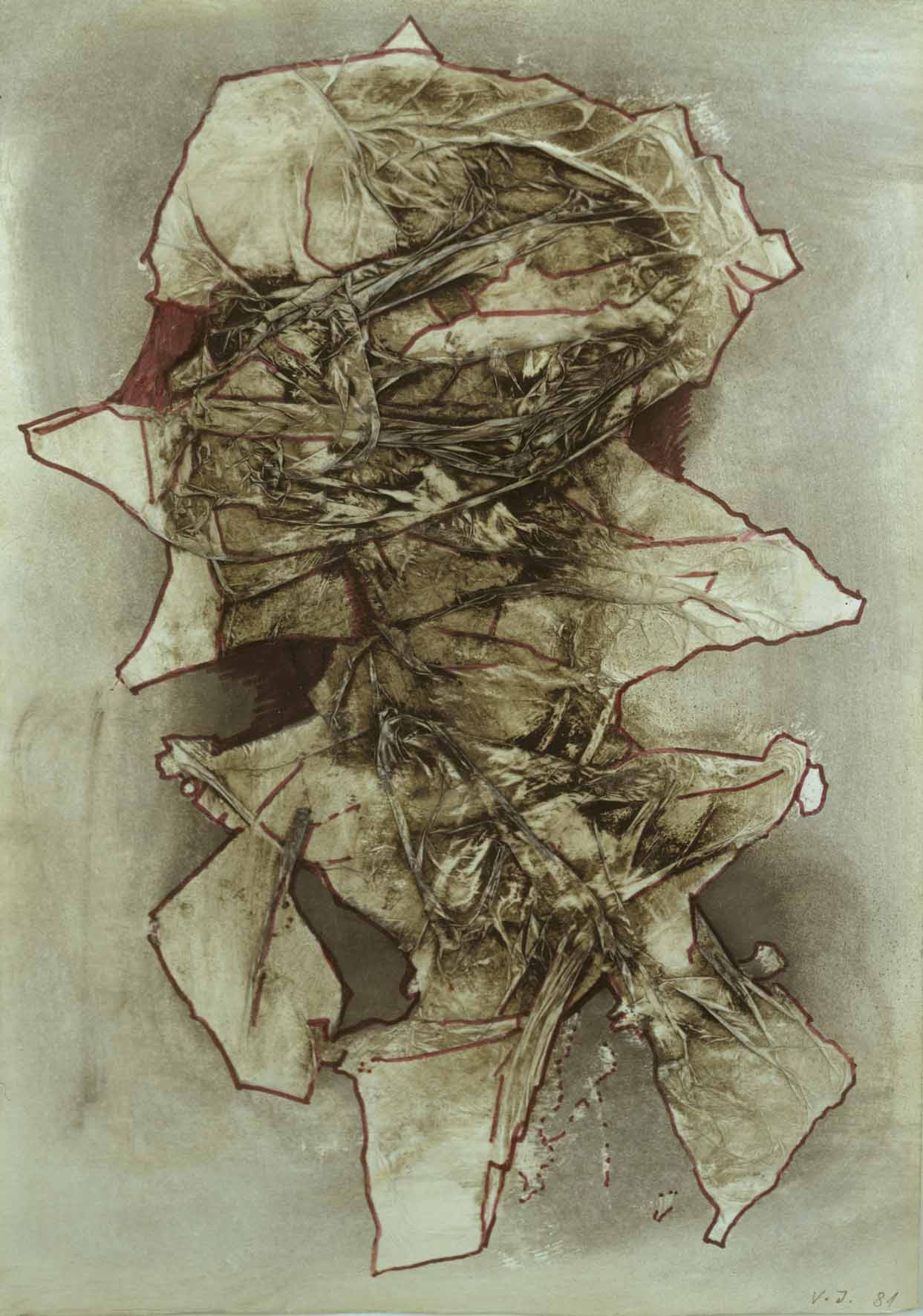
Collage (1981), 42 x 30 cm

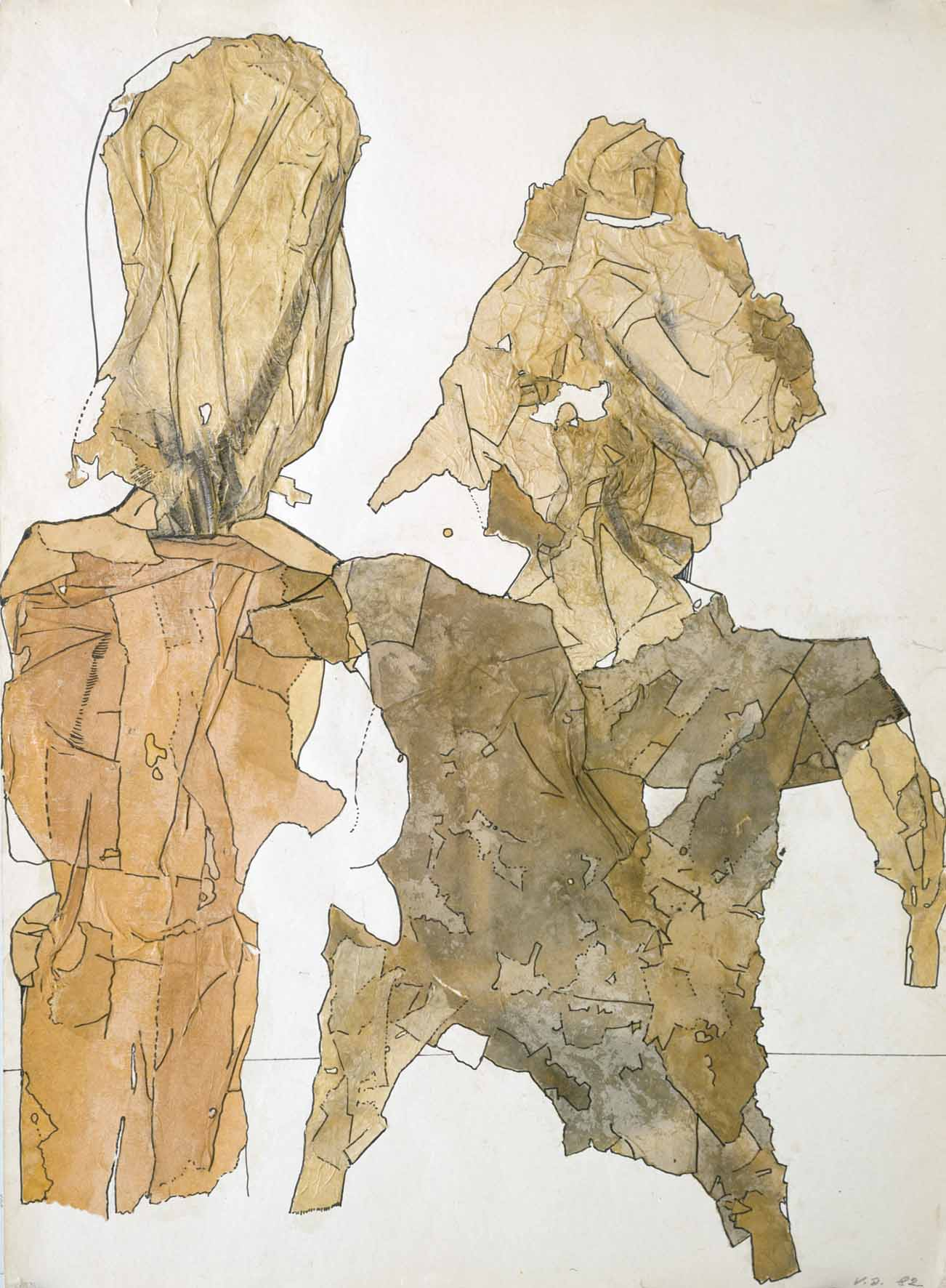
Collage (1982), 90 x 60 cm

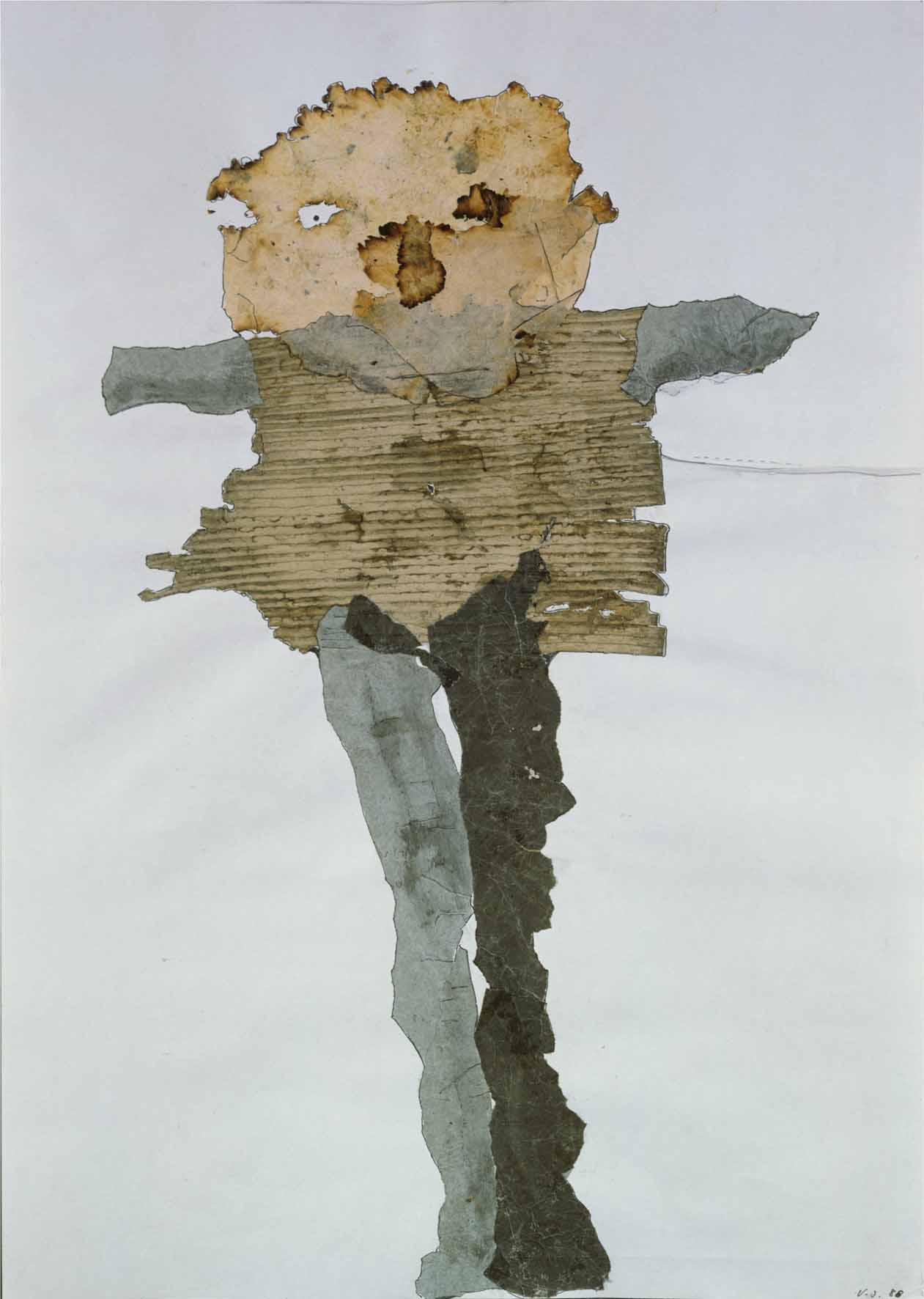
Figure (1986), collage with drawing and scorching, 88 x 62 cm

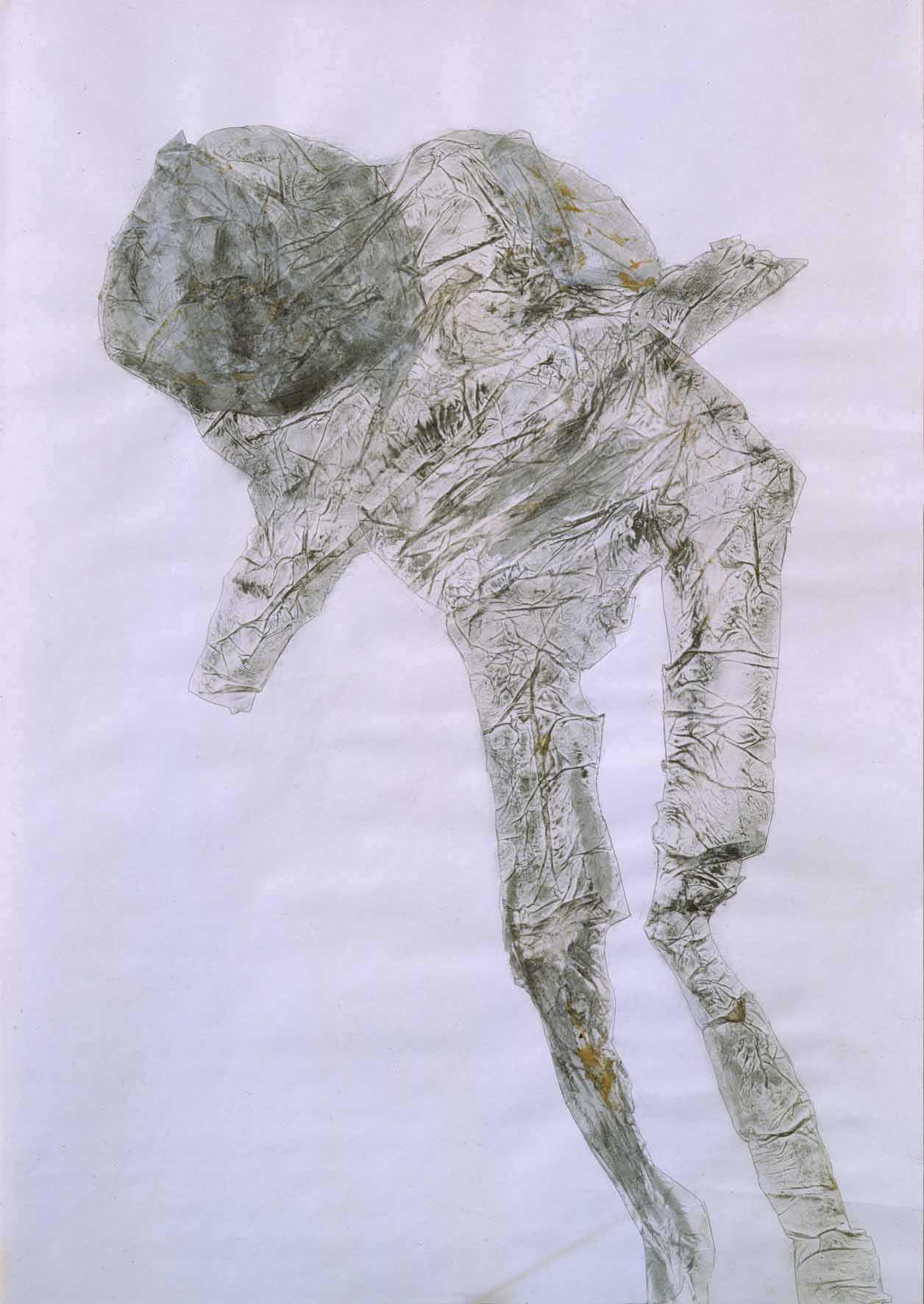
Figure (1986), collage with drawing, tissue paper, 88 x 62 cm

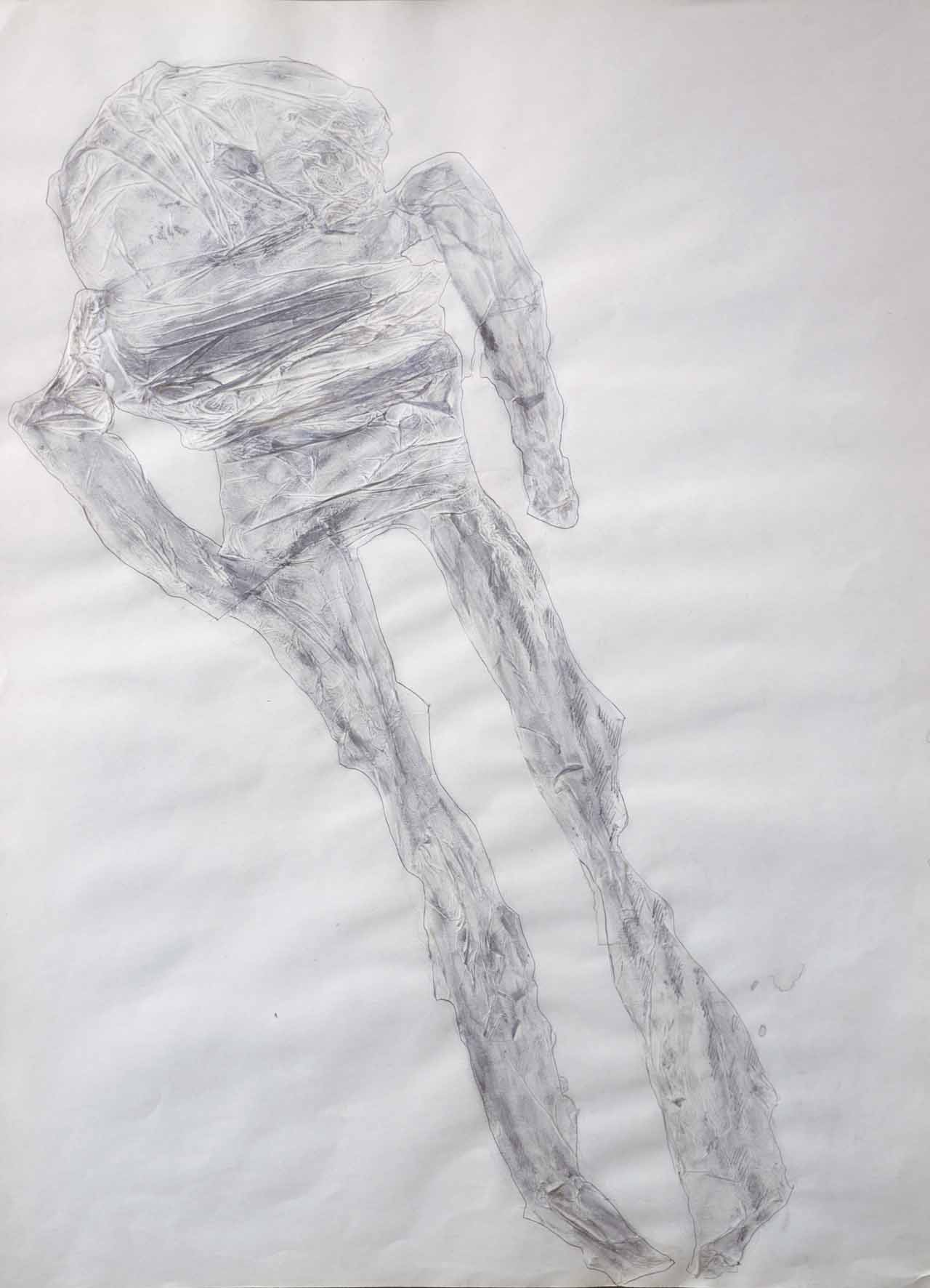
Shadow (1986), collage 88 x 62 cm

Věra Janoušková also created a number of sculptural drawings and her graphic work is also well known.

=== Sculptures in public space ===
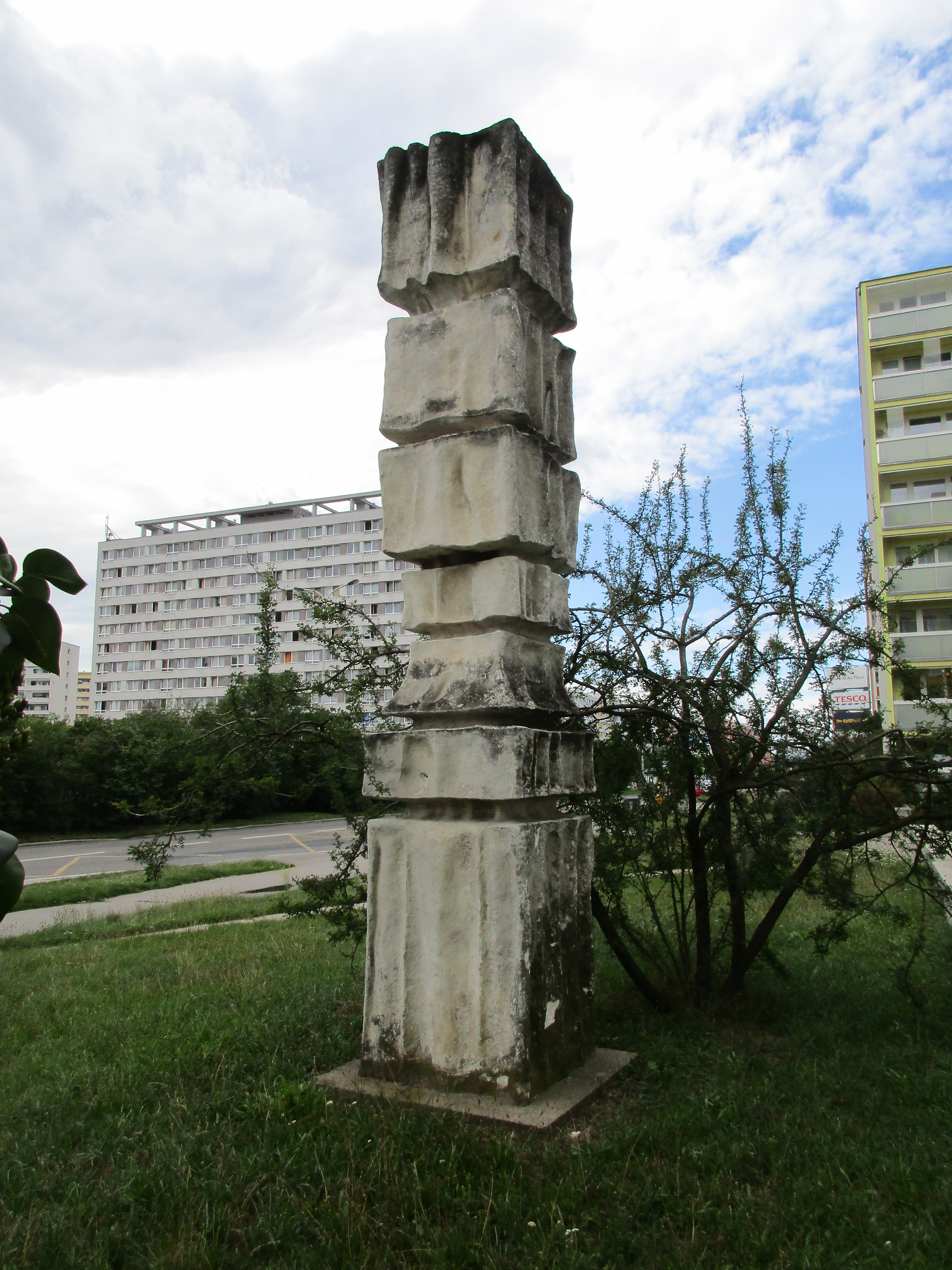
Pillar, Braník, Prague 4

- Sculpture in front of the school in Příbram
- 1969 – Pillar, Prague 4
- Ceramic reliefs Mining and Spa industry, Karviná Railway Station
- Fountain, atrium, former Chemapol building (destroyed during reconstruction)
- 1980 – Crystal, Prague 11, Háje, removed in 2010

=== Collections ===
- National Gallery Prague
- Moravian Gallery in Brno
- Office of the President
- Museum Kampa
- Prague City Gallery
- Czech Museum of Visual Arts Prague, now Gallery of the Central Bohemian Region Kutná Hora
- Charles University
- Museum of Art in Olomouc
- Museum of Art and Design in Benešov
- Aleš South Bohemian Gallery in Hluboká nad Vltavou
- Gallery of Fine Arts in Ostrava
- Gallery of Art in Karlovy Vary
- Gallery of Modern Art in Roudnice nad Labem
- Gallery of Modern Art in Hradec Králové
- Regional Gallery in Liberec
- North Bohemian Gallery of Fine Arts in Litoměřice
- East Bohemian Gallery in Pardubice
- Klatovy / Klenová Gallery
- Regional Gallery of Highlands in Jihlava
- Private collections at home and abroad.

=== Exhibitions (selection) ===
==== Author's ====
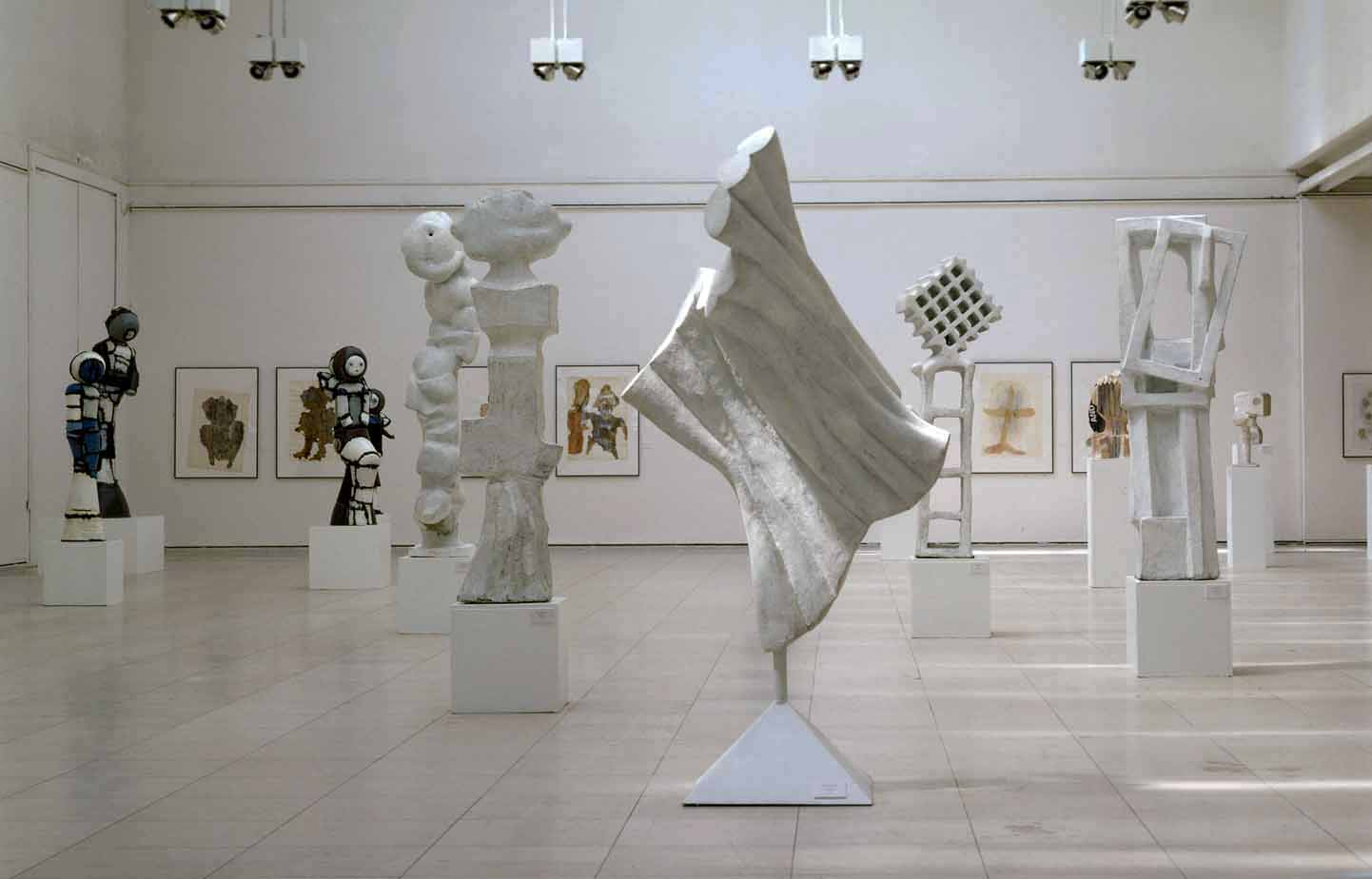
View into the exhibition of Věra Janoušková, Mánes Gallery, Prague 2002

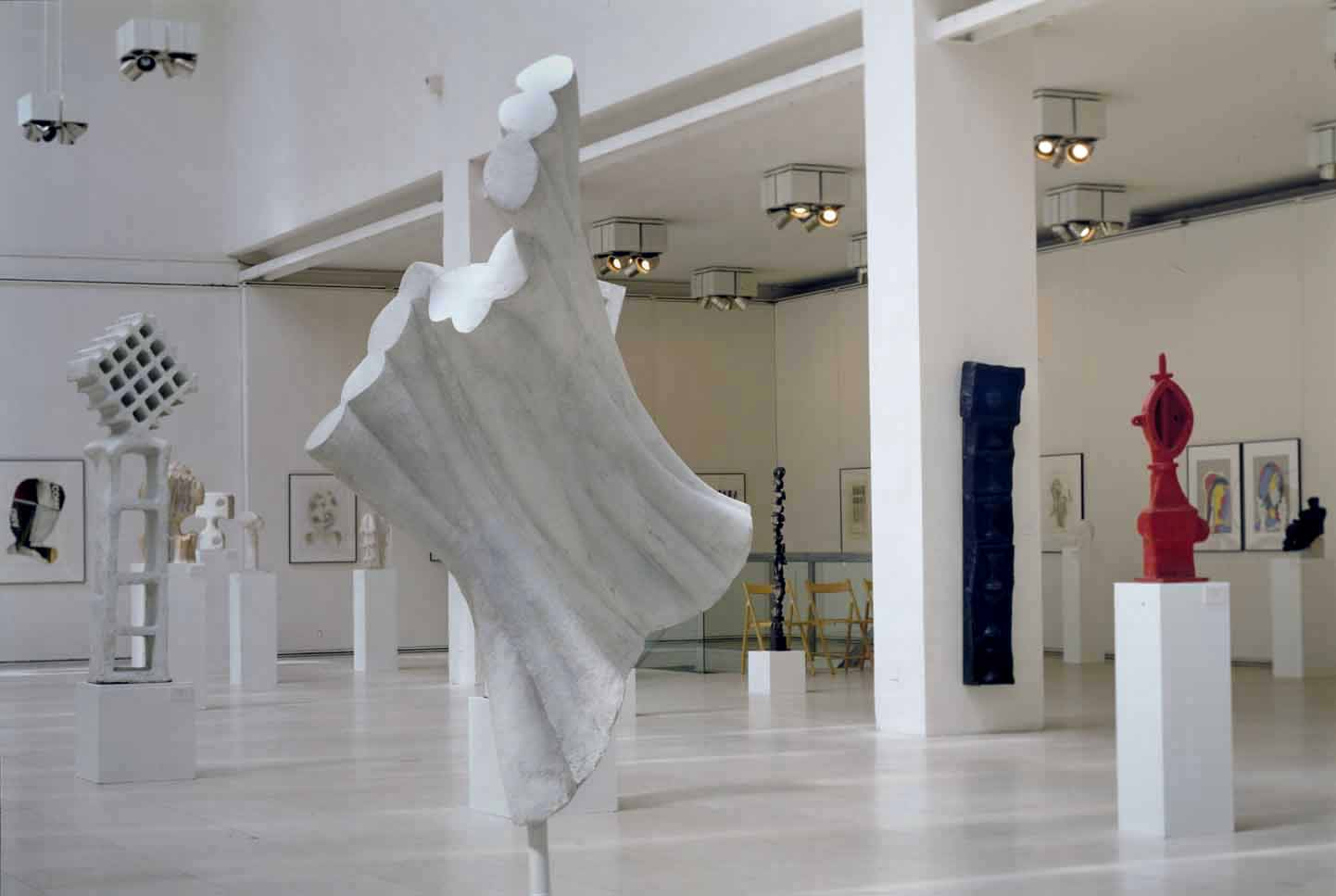
View into the exhibition of Věra Janoušková, Mánes Gallery, Prague 2002 (2)

- 1960 – Plastiky / Sculptures, Síň Lidové demokracie Prague (with A. Šimotová)
- 1965 – Intuice a řád / Intuition and order, Václav Špála Gallery, Prague
- 1967 – Věra Janoušková, Vladimír Janoušek: Sochy / Sculptures, Regional Gallery in Liberec (the only joint exhibition of Janoušek couple)
- 1982 – Koláže, smalty / Collages, Enamels, Attic Exhibition Hall and Těšín Theatre, Český Těšín (60th anniversary exhibition)
- 1992 – Koláže, plastiky / Collages, sculptures, Gerulata Gallery, Bratislava
- 1992 – Sochy a koláže z let 1960/1992 / Sculptures and collages from 1960/1992, National Gallery Prague
- 1995/96 – Osinky, smalty, koláže / Asbesto cements, Enamels, Collages, Gallery of Fine Arts Karlovy Vary, North Bohemian Gallery in Litoměřice, East Bohemian Gallery Pardubice, Regional Gallery of Highlands Jihlava Stodola Český Krumlov, Galerie U Bílého jednorožce, Klatovy, Galerie ve věži, Planá
- 1998 – Plastiky a koláže / Sculptures and Collages, Synagoga, Hranice, Egon Schiele Art Centrum Český Krumlov
- 2001 – Retrospective, Egon Schiele Art Centrum, Český Krumlov
- 2002 – Tvorba z let 1954–2000, Plastiky, reliéfy, koláže / Works from 1954 to 2000, Sculptures, Reliefs, Collages, Trigon Gallery, Plzeň
- 2002 – Výběr z díla 1948–2002 / Selected works 1948–2002, Mánes, Prague
- 2002 – Věra Janoušková: Koláže a smalty / Collages and Enamels, Chamber of Deputies of the Czech Republic
- 2002 – Sochy / Sculptures, Exhibition Hall Sokolská 26, Ostrava
- 2007 – Nové koláže / New Collages, Galerie U Bílého jednorožce, Klatovy
- 2010 – Věra Janoušková, Vladimír Janoušek: Odkaz / Legacy, Nebílovy Castle
- 2011 – Věra Janoušková: Intuice a řád / Intuition and order, Museum Kampa, Prague

==== Collective ====
- 1950, 1953 – Members' Exhibition Umělecká beseda, Prague
- 1965 – Nuove realta nell´arte della Cecoslovacchia contemporanea, Sampierdarena, Genoa
- 1965 – Objekt / Object, Václav Špála Gallery, Prague
- 1965 – La transfiguration de l'art tchéque: Peinture – sculpture – verre – collages, Liège
- 1966 – Aktuální tendence českého umění. Obrazy, sochy, grafika / Current trends in Czech art. Paintings, sculptures, graphics, Prague, Berlin, Liège
- 1966 – Tschechoslowakische Kunst der Gegenwart, Akademie der Künste, Berlin
- 1967 – Mostra d'arte contemporanea cecoslovacca, Turin, The Hague, Middelheim, Montreal
- 1967 – Expo 67 Montreal
- 1968 – Sculpture tchècoslovaque de Myslbek à nos jours, Musée Rodin (Hôtel Biron), Paris
- 1969 – New Figuration, Mánes, Prague
- 1970 – Sodobna češkoslovaška umetnost, Ljubljana, Piran, Zagreb
- 1970 – Tschechische Skulptur des 20. Jahrhunderts, von Myslbek bis zur Gegenwart, Berlin
- 1984 – Papier wird Kunst, Zeitgenössische Kunst der ČSSR, Galerie Dialog e. V., Berlin
- 1989 – Czech Sculpture 1948–1988, Regional Museum of Local History, Olomouc
- 1990 – Nová skupina: Členská výstava / New Group: Members' Exhibition, Municipal Library, Prague, House of Art in Opava
- 1991 – Tradition und Avantgarde in Prag, Osnabrück, Bonn
- 1993–2003 – Minisalon, Mons, Hollywood, Cincinnati, New York City, Indianapolis, Rapids, Albuquerque, Chicago, Columbia, Nord Dartmouth, St. Petersburg, Fort Myers, Prague, Brussels, Jakarta, Ubud, Surabaja, Paris
- 1993/94 – New Figuration, North Bohemian Gallery Litoměřice, East Bohemian Gallery Pardubice, Moravian Gallery in Brno, House of Art Opava, Regional Gallery of Highlands Jihlava
- 1994 – Foci of Rebirth, Municipal Library, Prague
- 1997 – Czech Collage, Kinský Palace, Prague
- 1999 – Umění zrychleného času. Česká výtvarná scéna 1958–1968 / The Art of Accelerated Time. Czech Art Scene 1958–1968, Prague
- 2004/2006 – Šedesátá / The sixties, From the collection of Zlatá husa Gallery, House of Art Brno, Gallery of Art Karlovy Vary
- 2008 – 3 Female Sculptors (Janoušková, Kmentová, Szapocznikow), Queen Anne's Summer Palace, Prague
- 2017 – Generation One: The First Generation of Czech Postmodernism, Castle Brewery Litomyšl

== Sources ==
=== Catalogues ===
- Jiří Šetlík: Adriena Šimotová, Pastely a tempery / Pastels and Temperas, Věra Janoušková, Sochy / Sculptures (cat. 12 p.), SČVU Prague 1960
- Jindřich Chalupecký: Věra Janoušková – Intuice a řád / Intuition and Order, (cat. 12 p.), SČSVU Prague 1965
- Ludmila Vachtová: Věra Janoušková – Sochy / Sculptures (cat. 22 p.), Prague 1967
- Jaromír Zemina: Věra Janoušková, (cat. 20 p.), Český Těšín 1982
- Jiří Šetlík: Svět sochařky Věry Janouškové / The world of sculptor Věra Janoušková, 1984, samizdat
- Jiří Šetlík: Věra Janoušková – Hlavy a těla / Heads and Bodies, ÚMCH, Prague, 1986
- Mahulena Nešlehová: Věra Janoušková – Kresby a koláže / Drawings and Collages, Brno 1986
- Marcela Pánková: Věra Janoušková – Smalty / Enamels, ÚKDŽ, Prague 1987
- Ivo Janoušek: Věra Janoušková, KS Opatov, Prague 1987
- Mahulena Nešlehová:Věra Janoušková, OKVS Atrium, Prague 1988
- Václav Erben: Věra Janoušková – Sochy a koláže z let 1960/1992 / Sculptures and Collages from 1960/1992 (cat. 36 p.), National Gallery Prague 1992
- Marcela Pánková: Věra Janoušková – Škvárovky a koláže / Slag sculptures and Collages, Pallas Gallery, Prague 1993
- Josef Hlaváček: Věra Janoušková – Rané koláže a plastiky / Early Collages and Sculptures, Gallery 60/70, Prague 1993
- Václav Erben: Věra Janoušková, Caesar Gallery, Olomouc 1993
- Jaromír Zemina:Věra Janoušková – Osinky, smalty, koláže / Asbestos cements, Enamels and Collages (cat. 64 p.), GU Karlovy Vary 1995 ISBN 80-85014-23-8
- Jindřich Chalupecký et al., Věra Janoušková, Aspekt Gallery, (cat., 40 p.), 1998
- Jaromír Zemina: Věra Janoušková – Plastiky a koláže / Sculptures and Collages, Synagogue Gallery, Hranice 1998
- Jaromír Zemina: Věra Janoušková – Smalty a koláže / Enamels and Collages, City Museum in Nová Paka 1998
- Miloslav Chlupáč et al.,Věra Janoušková – Retrospektiva / Retrospective (cat. 92 p.), Egon Schiele Art Centrum, Český Krumlov 2001
- Jaromír Zemina: Věra Janoušková – Já to dělám takhle / I do it this way (162 p., cs., en.), Torst, Prague 2001 ISBN 80-7215-162-2
- Milan Weber: Věra Janoušková, Exhibition Hall Sokolská 26, Ostrava 2002
- Řeháková N (ed.),Věra Janoušková, Vladimír Janoušek: Výběr z díla / Selected works, (cat. 80 p.), West Bohemian University in Plzeň 2004, ISBN 80-86415-27-9
- Machalický J., Šašek J., Věra Janoušková: Intuice a řád / Intuition and Order (cat. 6 p.), Museum Kampa, Prague 2011
- Olga Malá, Věra Janoušková: Šedá figura II / Grey Figure II, (cat. 12 p.), Prague City Gallery 2017

=== Collective catalogues ===
- Tvůrčí skupina / Creative Group UB 12 (cat. Šetlík J., 16 p.), 1962
- UB 12 (cat. Zemina J., 6 p.), 1964
- Aktuální tendence českého umění / Actual Trends of Czech Art (cat. Míčko M., 162 p.), 1966
- Socha a město / Sculpture and City (cat. Moulis J. et al., 114 p.), 1969
- Devět / Nine, (cat. Křížová K.), Gallery in tower, Mělník 1981
- Obraz a objekt / Picture and Object (Janoušková, Kopecký, Svobodová, Judl), cat. Judlová M, Tábor 1984
- Nová skupina / New Group (cat Hlaváček J. et al., 84 p.), 1990 ISBN 80-900051-9-5
- Minisalon (cat. Skalník J., 220 p., en., cz.), Jazzová sekce, Unie výtvarných umělců České republiky, Prague 1992
- Nová figurace / New Figuration (cat. Petrová E., 104 p.), 1993
- UB 12 (cat. Šetlík J., Zemina J., 28 p.), Gallery of Modern Art, Roudnice nad Labem 1994
- 3 Sochařky / 3 Women Sculptors (cat. Primusová A), Art D, The Prague Castle Administration 2008, ISBN 978-80-903876-3-8

=== Encyclopedias and general sources ===
- Philippe J., La transfiguration de l'art tcheque (cat. 16 p.), 1965
- Cherchi LCS, Zemina J., Mostra d'arte contemporanea Cecoslovacca (cat. 60 p.), 1967
- Fernand Hazan (ed.), Nouveau dictionnaire de la sculpture moderne, Paris 1970, p. 145-146
- Kotalík JT., Procházka V., Tschechische Skulptur des 20. Jahrhunderts (cat. 84 p.), 1970
- Bénamou G, L'art aujourd´hui en Tchecoslovaquie (190 p., fr.), 1979
- Gruša J. et al., Tradition und Avantgarde in Prag (cat. 220 p.), 1991
- Beran Z. et al.,Umění zastaveného času / Art when the time stood still (268 p., cs, en.), 1996 ISBN 80-7056-050-9
- Dryje F. et al.,Česká koláž / Czech Collage (165 p.), 1997 ISBN 80-86010-04-X
- Nešlehová M., Poselství jiného výrazu / A message of a different expression (286 p., cs., en.), 1997 ISBN 80-902481-0-1
- Juříková M., Železný V., Šedesátá /The Sixties (414 p., cs., en.), 2004 ISBN 80-239-3406-6
- Brozman D. et al., České ateliéry / Czech Studios (519 p., cz., en.), ed. ART cz, 2005 ISBN 80-239-5528-4
- Slavická M., Šetlík J., UB 12, Studie, rozhovory, dokumenty / UB 12, Studies, interviews, documents (337 p.), 2006 ISBN 80-86990-07-9
- Machalický J., Česká koláž / Czech Collage (254 p.) ed. Gallery s. r. o., Prague 2010

=== Articles (selection) ===
- Magda Juříková, Jana Chytilová, Královna českých skládek / Queen of Czech dumps (interview with Věra Janoušková), Art and Antiques, 2002, p. 72-79
- Anita Pelánová: Věra Janoušková – Já to dělám takhle / Here's how I do it, Revolver Revue Critical Supplement 25 / 2003, p. 84-86
