= Vladimír Janoušek =

Czech artist (1922–1986)

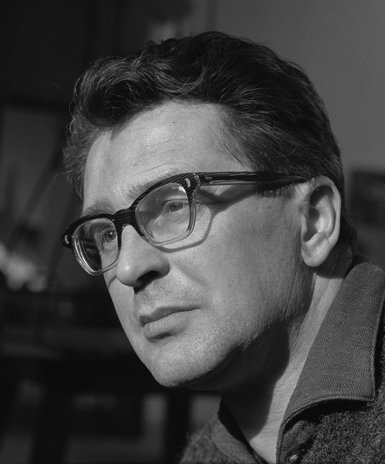
- Vladimír Janoušek in the 1960s
- Born: 30 January 1922; Ždírnice, Czechoslovakia
- Died: 8 September 1986 (aged 64); Prague, Czechoslovakia
- Education: Academy of Arts, Architecture and Design in Prague
- Known for: sculptor, painter
- Notable work: Fountain, St. George's Convent, Prague, The Threat of War (Expo '70), The Process (1984, variable sculpture)
- Movement: UB 12
- Spouse: Věra Janoušková

Signature
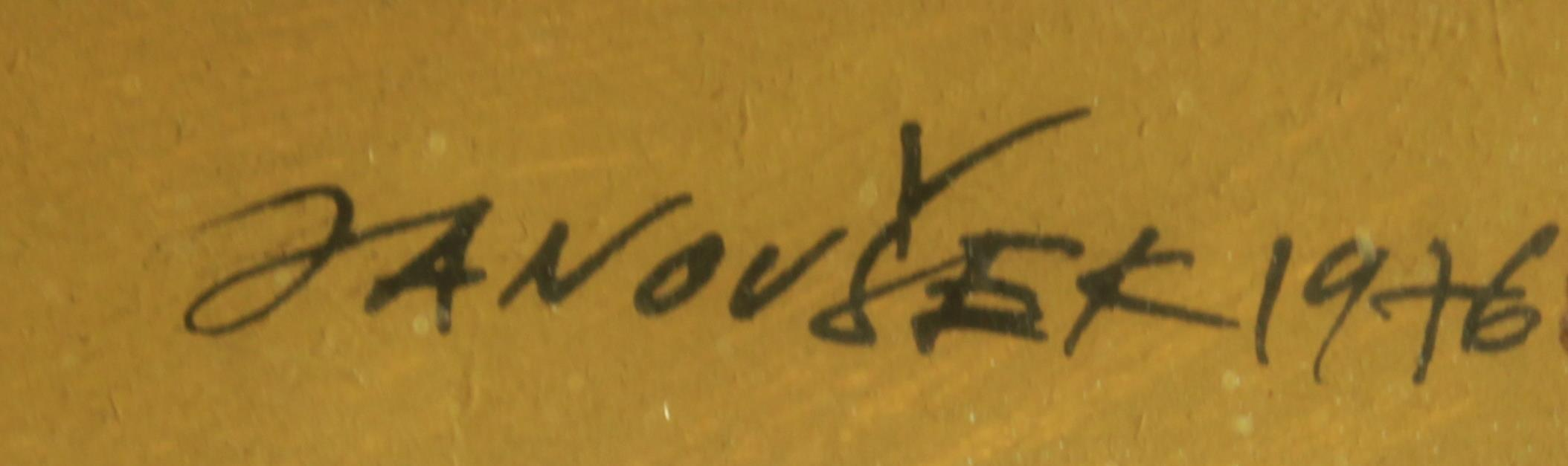

Vladimír Janoušek (30 January 1922 – 8 September 1986) was a Czech sculptor and painter. He was founding member of the UB 12 group and husband of the sculptor Věra Janoušková. In the 1960s he was a sought-after collaborator of architects. Janoušek almost never abandoned figuration, but the moving parts of his sculptures represent a radicalisation of form that breaks away from the traditional concept of sculpture. The originality and conceptual approach gives his sculpture a European significance. He is one of the few Czech sculptors listed in the New Dictionary of Modern Sculpture, published in Paris in 1970. After Warsaw Pact invasion of Czechoslovakia and so called normalization he lost the possibility to exhibit and became one of the most persecuted Czech artists.

== Life ==
Vladimír Janoušek was born in Ždírnice, in the family of Vojtěch Janoušek (1895-1984), a legionary and officer of the Czechoslovak army, who was in charge of building Czechoslovak border fortifications. His younger brother Jiří also served in the army. Vladimír Janoušek's cousin is the art historian Jaromír Zemina. Janoušek's uncle Otakar Zemina (1899-1990) was a painter and a teacher at the School of Arts and Crafts in Brno. His grandfather was Karel Otakar Svoboda, a head teacher in Kalná Voda, violinist and amateur painter, friend of František Kaván. Thanks to his youth spent in the countryside, Vladimír Janoušek perceived the functionality of folk architecture, the local pottery and stonemasonry tradition, as well as the sculptures in nearby Kuks and Hořice.

At a young age, he was caught up in the events of the war – the secession of the Sudetenland, relocation and later a long forced labour deployment in Nazi Germany. He began his secondary school studies at the gymnasium in Trutnov (Prof. of drawing Bedřich Mudroch, member of Umělecká beseda) and finished them in 1940 in Úpice. In Úpice, he attended lectures on theatre organized by the Central Union of Theatre Amateurs. In 1940-1941 he was an apprentice at a construction firm in Hostinné and was considering studying architecture. It was only a graduate course (1941) in Hořice, a town with a long tradition of stonemasonry and sculpture, that have helped him decide between his interest in architecture and the study of sculpture. After a year spent at the School of Arts and Crafts in Brno, in 1942 he started studying at the School of Arts and Crafts in Prague under Prof. Karel Dvořák. His studies were interrupted by forced labour deployment and until the end of the war he worked at a sawmill in Oels, Silesia. Janoušek was friends with Ladislav Zívr from the 1940s, with whom he shared his passion for the work of Otto Gutfreund.

After the war he failed the entrance exams to the Academy, but was accepted to the studio of Prof. Josef Wagner at the Academy of Applied Arts. His classmates, apart from his future wife Věra Havlová, were Zdeněk Palcr, Miloslav Chlupáč, Olbram Zoubek and Eva Kmentová. Janoušek's sculptural style was particularly influenced by the late work of Otto Gutfreund and before 1948 also by the Prague exhibitions of Western European art (Baltasar Lobo, Picasso, 1946 Constant Permeke, 1947) and the work of Henry Moore, from the art theorists especially by the reflections of Bohumil Kubišta and the lectures of prof. Václav Nebeský. In the years 1945–1947, he simultaneously studied art history at the Faculty of Arts of Charles University (prof. Jan Patočka, Antonín Matějček, Jan Květ, Václav Mencl). After 1948 Czechoslovak coup d'état he refused to join the Communist Party of Czechoslovakia and for one year became a member of the Czechoslovak Social Democracy. He finished his studies in 1950 with his graduation thesis - a monumental sculpture of Master Jan Hus, of which only a photograph has survived. From 1951 he was a member of the Umělecká beseda and the Czechoslovak Union of Artists (until 1970).

In 1948, during his studies, he married the sculptor Věra Havlová and spent two semesters with her at the Academy of Fine Arts in Sofia. More than teaching, he enjoyed their joint trips to the Bulgarian countryside, from where he brought back a number of drawings with folk themes. The Janoušek couple acquired their first studio in a workshop with an adjoining courtyard in the former Smíchov prison in Malátova Street. It became a place of meetings and exchanges of opinions of Janoušek's generational fellows and younger artists. Among his friends were Čestmír Kafka, Hugo Demartini, Jitka Svobodová, Stanislav Kolíbal or Rudolf Uher. In 1964, they moved to their own studio built according to Vladimír Janoušek's design and Josef Hrubý's project on a vacant plot in Prague-Košíře. In the 1970s, when their Prague studio began to be monitored by the StB, they set up a rural studio in a former school in Vidonice near Pecka.

Janoušek became an unnamed spokesman for the UB 12 group in the 1960s, and he communicated his views on sculpture in interviews for magazines and in his own articles. He was critical of the "Brussels style" of Expo 58, which he regarded as superficial decorativism and was untouched by informel and the principle of the "inner model". He set himself against the sculptors exhibiting in 1964 at the Nová síň Gallery (Koblasa, Sekal, Veselý, Nepraš, etc. - Exhibition D), which resulted in mutual hostility lasting several years. In the late 1960s, he was the first sculptor to exhibit solo at the Nová síň Gallery. Jiří Kotalík invited him to become the head of the sculpture studio at the Prague Academy, but after the Warsaw Pact invasion of Czechoslovakia in August 1968 and the uproar over his sculpture Threat of War at Expo '70, this was no longer an option.

In 1954, Vladimír Janoušek participated in the Venice Biennale. He was invited to the Expo 58 in Brussels, Expo 67 in Montreal and Expo 70 in Osaka. There he had a large sculptural installation The Threat of War, which was a response to the Warsaw Pact invasion of Czechoslovakia. He was then subjected to political persecution and was not allowed to exhibit officially until the late 1980s. Exceptions were the 1982 exhibitions in Orlová and in the unofficial exhibition hall of the Institute of Macromolecular Chemistry, Czech Academy of Sciences. Other prepared exhibitions at the Sculpture Gallery in Hořice (1980, 1987), the Stavoprojekt Gallery in Brno (1986), for which a catalogue was published, and the Podkrkonošské Museum in Nová Paka (1987) were banned. For principled reasons, he refused to participate in collective exhibitions organised by the Communist Party of Czechoslovakia on various anniversaries. His sculptures are a tragic testimony of a lonely man who projected into them an obsessive feeling of a never-ending dialogue with a self-proclaimed investigator.

In 1952-1970 he was a member of the Union of Czechoslovak Artists and until 1960 of the so-called Umělecká beseda centre in Prague, then in 1960 a founding member of the creative group UB 12, which was formed by the secession of Umělecká beseda members. He worked together with his wife Věra Janoušková in a joint studio in Prague-Košíře, from 1975 also in Vidonice. Vladimír Janoušek suffered from diabetes and in the mid-1980s the disease complicated his life considerably, but he was finally broken by the ban on his exhibition in Brno in 1986, which he had carefully prepared. Soon afterwards he fell ill with a virus, lost the will to live and after a week of treatment died on 8 September 1986 in Prague. He is buried together with Věra Janoušková in Byšičky. The tombstone using Janoušek's statue The Last Fall was designed by Czech architect Alena Šrámková.

All works of the couple are now managed by the Věra and Vladimír Janoušek Foundation, founded by Věra Janoušková.

== Work ==
Professor Josef Wagner influenced early sculptures of Vladimír Janoušek, based on harmonious shapes and a lyrical subtext (Sculpture for Magician's Lantern, 1958–1959). In his view the modernity of art was in distinction from visible reality, without denying its validity. He rejected the vulgar descriptiveness of Socialist Realism and sought as a starting point the generalization of human types and the abstracting order of compositions originating in the Renaissance. In the second half of 1960s, he still turned his interest to the elements and Universe ( The Sun, 1964–1965, Sailboat, 1969, Piece of Earth, Cloud, 1971, Fire, 1972), but the crushing pressure of the Communist regime, which was impossible to resist, created a state of permanent overload and a sense of abyss and fall with no way back. In the construction of his sculptures, he combines expressiveness of conception with the momentum of form. The subject of Janoušek's sculptures became a struggle and deviation from the authentic centre of gravity and established social rules, where man ceased to be the measure of values, and inevitability of fall and death. Over the years, also in connection with his severe diabetes, the feeling of the fatality of human destiny and its finality and hopelessness prevailed in his work.

=== 1955–1960 ===
Since his student years, Janoušek was attracted to spatial realisations, which he understood as an aesthetic element that organizes and characterizes space with its form and implications. In the 1950s, in addition to outstanding sculptural portraits (Wenceslaus Hollar, 1952, František Xaver Šalda, 1953, Václav Talich, Karel Havlíček Borovský, 1955–1957), Janoušek created also reliefs and numerous studies of sculptures for integration into architecture. Thanks to his cooperation with architects, he was commissioned to create four reliefs for the new milk drying plant in Zábřeh (1955). According to Janoušek's design, V. Bartůněk made a large sandstone relief for the House of Fashion on Wenceslas Square (1956). The relief deals primarily with the internal links of the figures and their relationship to the architecture, and is characterised by smooth transitions of convex volumes and harmony of form. Other reliefs were created by the Janoušek couple for a housing estate in Kladno and a school in Ostrava-Poruba.

Janoušek reacted sensitively to the times in which he lived. His sculpture War (1956) does not refer to World War II, but is a reaction to the suppression of the Hungarian anti-communist uprising in 1956. Together with Jiří Novák, he was the author of the large-scale relief Music for the Czechoslovak pavilion at the Expo 58, for which he received a Belgian diploma and Czechoslovak award for outstanding work. His sculpture of a Seated girl with a crystal (1959) for the newly opened Magician's Lantern anticipates his later work. The stucco sculpture Sculptor (1956) was a thematic homage to Professor Josef Wagner, using a similar type of head as his teacher for the same subject (1934). This work is the starting point in its conception of space and tectonics as well as constructive detail for the next period of Janoušek's work. What follows are figures enclosed in a rectangular construction (a space within a space) that define the sculpture as an object in an original way.

Janoušek's sculptures from the late 1950s are characterised by an emphasis on modelling volumes and silhouettes and a generalisation of form. He was one of the leading representatives of the revival process, who rejected the official and typified concept of "socialist man" and even in his reliefs with the theme of the work referred rather to the civilism of Group 42, active in 1942–1948. In 1958-1960 he created a monumental statue of Karel Hynek Mácha for Doksy, based on a concrete form, but conceived as an unconventional metaphor of a solitary man absorbed in himself, to which he subordinated formal elements such as drapery, gesture or the positioning of the torso and head.

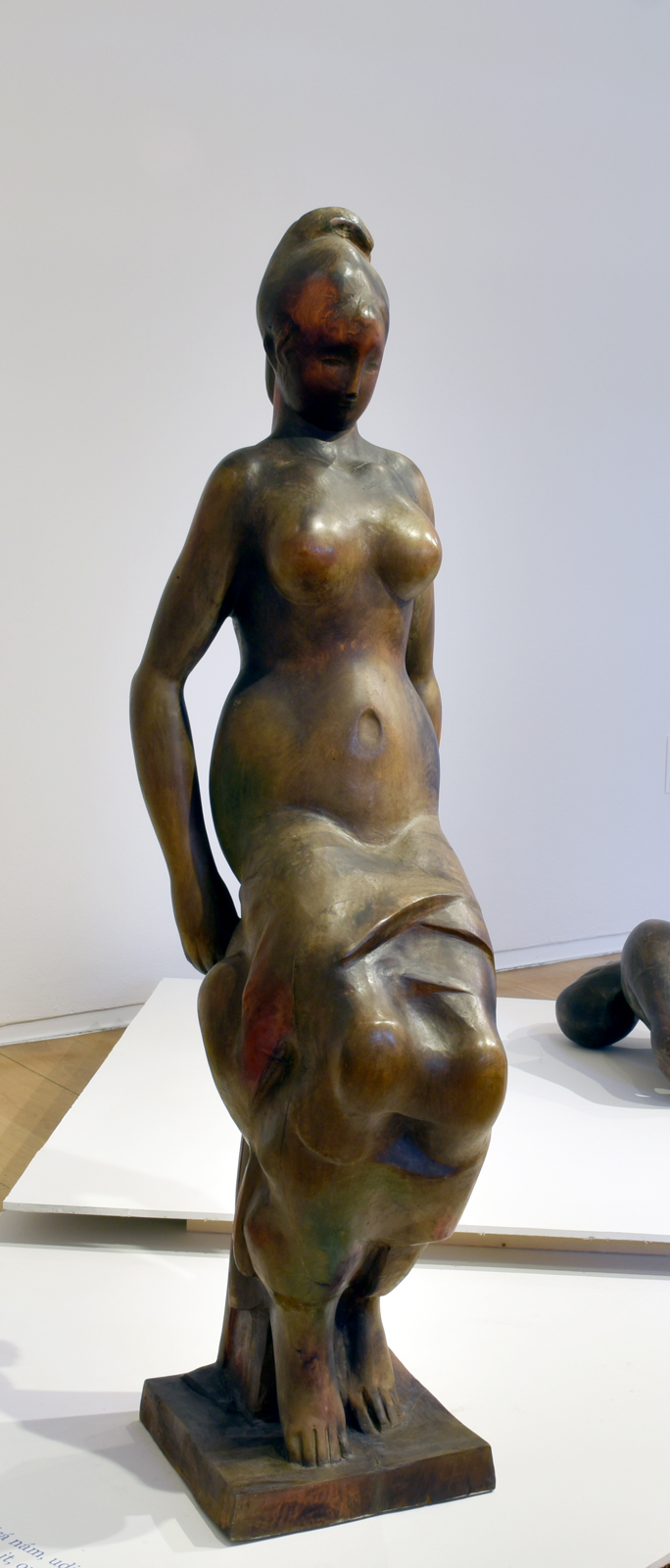
Model (1957–1958), limewood

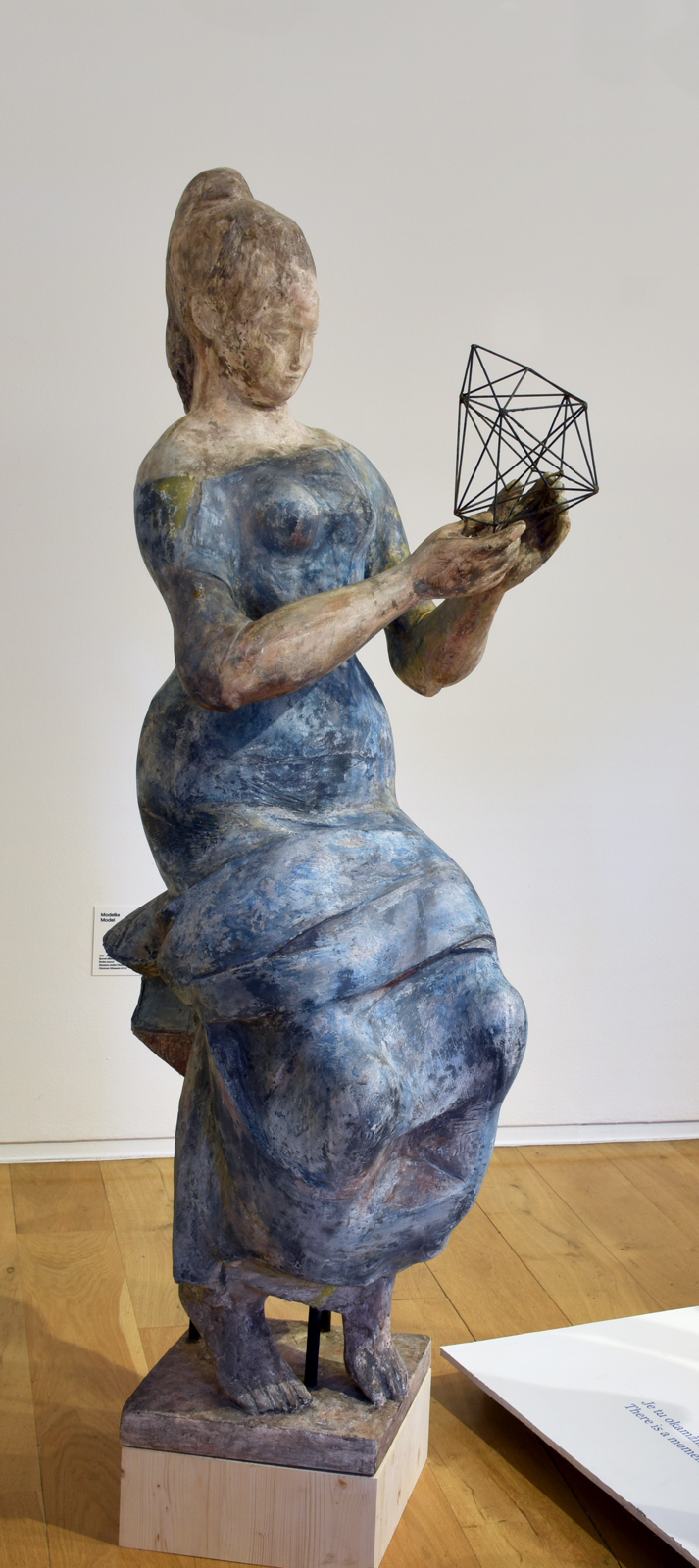
Sculpture for Magician's Lantern (1958–1959)

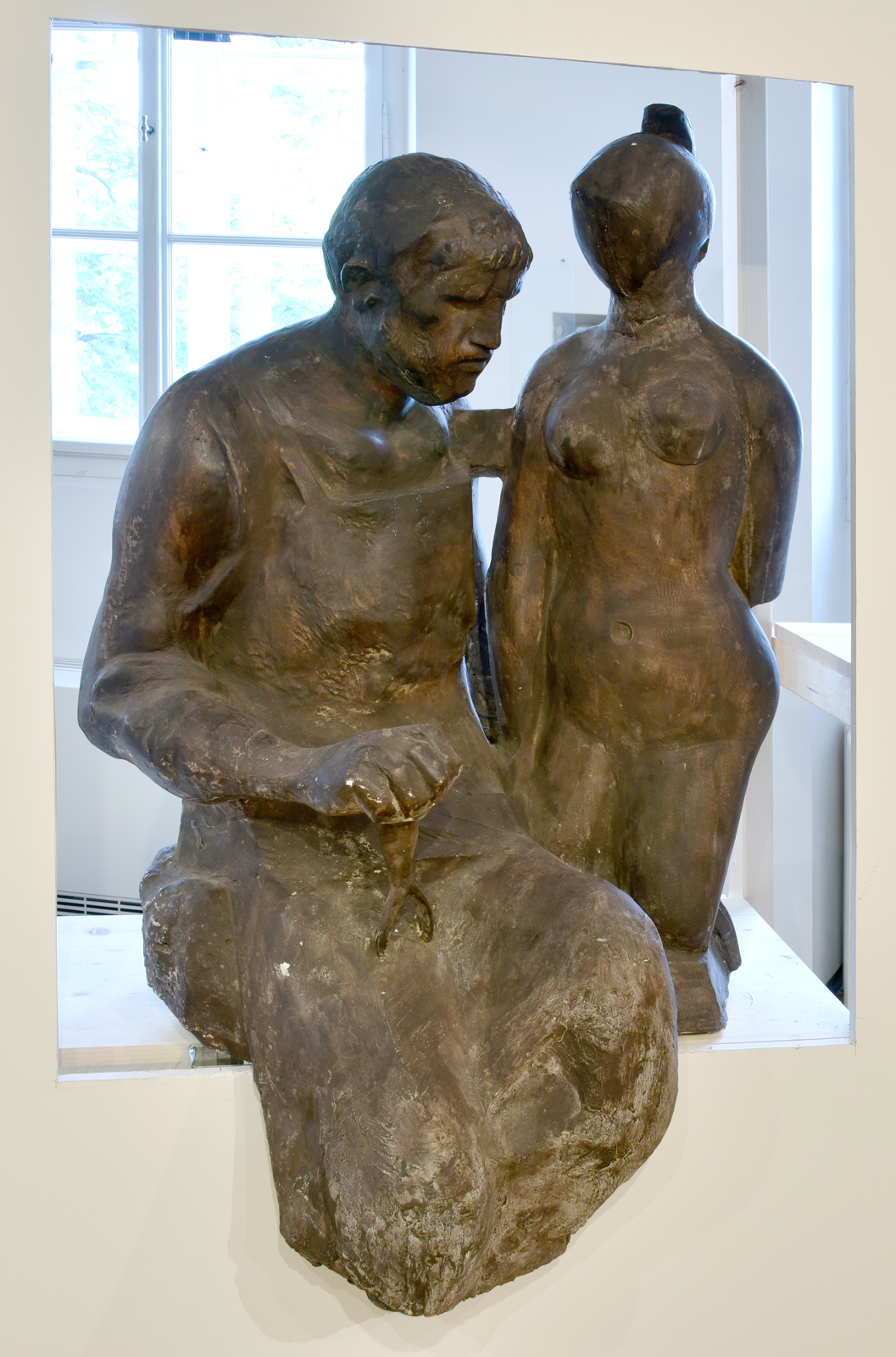
Sculptor (1958)

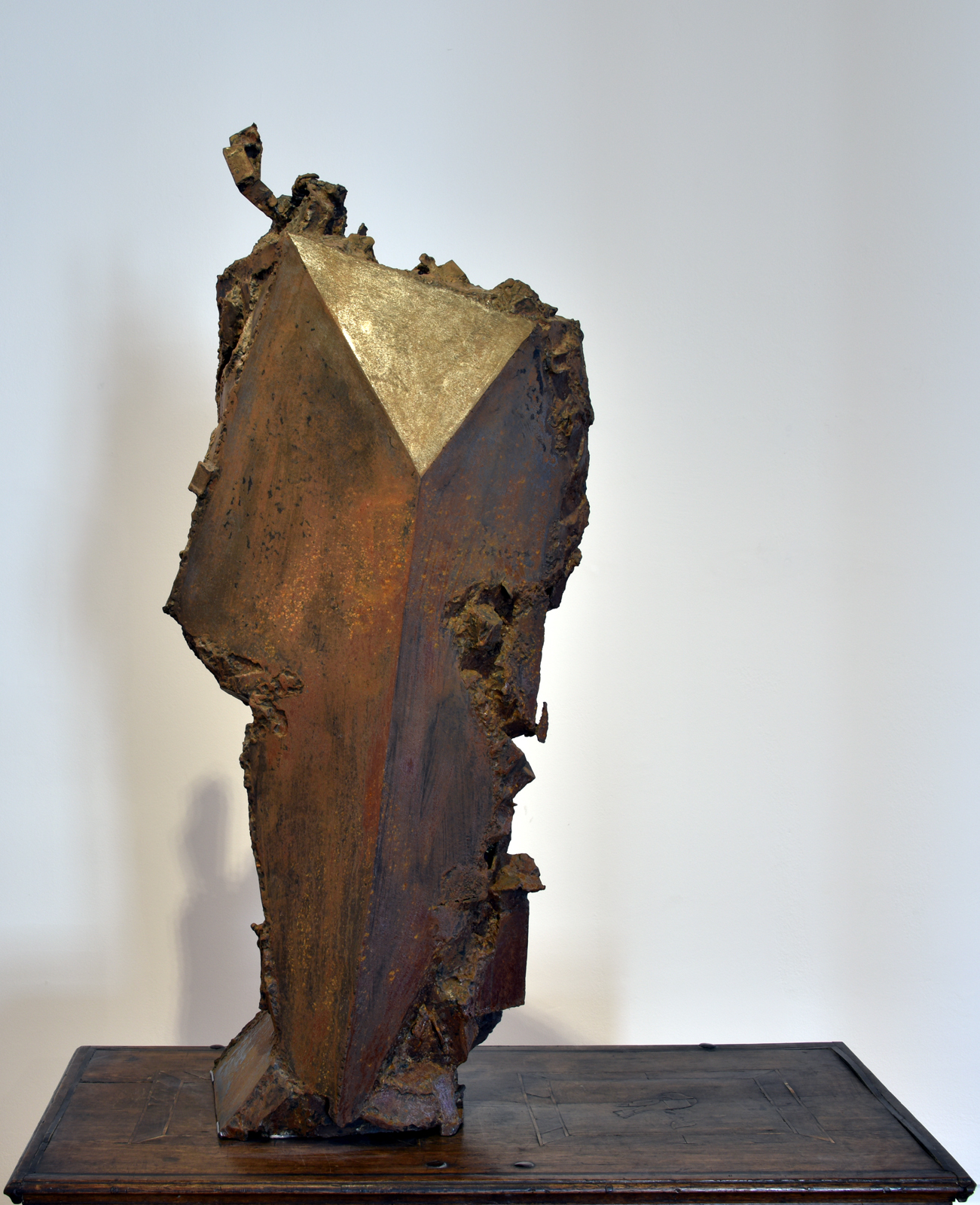
Crystal (1961)

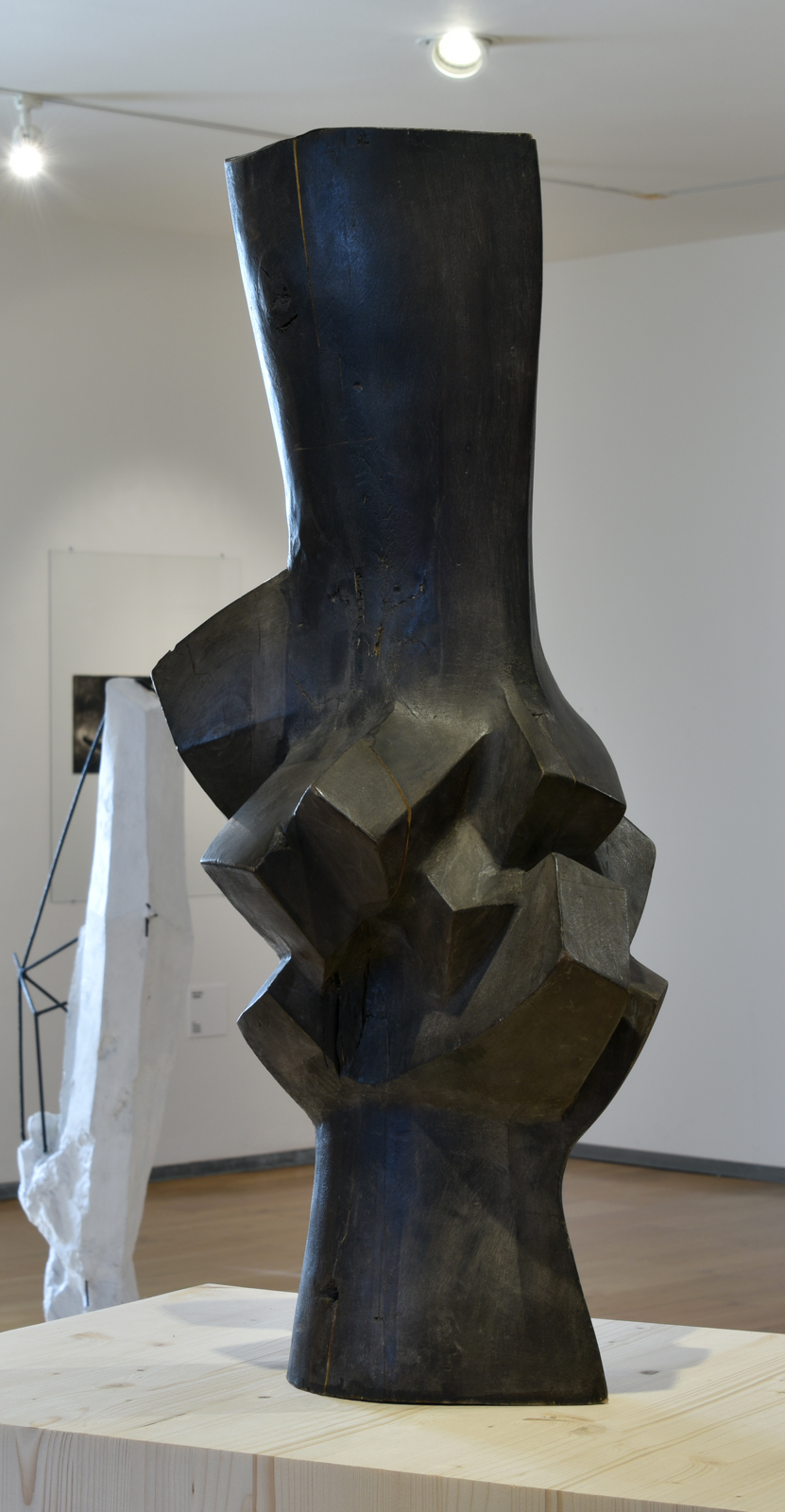
Pillar – Crystals (1963), Gallery of central Bohemian region, Kutná Hora

=== 1960–1970 ===
Although Janoušek's teachers were Karel Dvořák and Josef Wagner, and of the Czech sculptors he was most influenced by Otto Gutfreund, he turned for inspiration to the forerunners of modern sculpture such as Henry Moore, Alberto Giacometti, Lynn Chadwick, Anthony Caro, Germaine Richier, César or Yves Klein, and later also metal sculptors (Alexander Calder, David Smith, Richard Stankiewicz). His models were initially mainly sculptures emphasizing mass and volume rather than the outline of the sculpture. He aspired to a super-personal ideal, according to which the sculpture must stand on its own and the creator recedes into the background.

Initially, his conception of sculpture was close to the working method of Henry Moore, who, according to Janoušek, created his sculptures with the intellectual component suppressed, as if he was guided mainly by his sense of touch and modelled blindly. Moore was also close to him in his exemption from detail, dignity of content, emotional closure and organic form that blended naturally with nature and enlivened rectangular modern architecture. In the 1960s, the sculptor gradually abandoned traditional materials and used asbestos-cement or reinforced concrete, fiberglass and plaster with acronex. His new theme became the blending of the growth of organic form with crystals (Crystal, 1961, An Hour of Botany, 1961–1962). In 1962, a Czech translation of Ernst Fischer's On the Necessity of Art (Orbis, Prague) was published, which includes a chapter devoted to crystals. Janoušek was at that time striving to organise and separate the essential from the amorphousness of matter, and in his sculpture Pillar - Crystals (1963) he outlined his idea of the emergence of a crystal from matter. By his sculpture The Sun (1964-1965) he became the main representative of brutalism in sculpture.

As early as 1957, during his collaboration with Jiří Novák, he learned to weld metal and realized some of his earlier drawings as sculptures in which a wire construction was attached to a figurative base. The rational geometric shapes thus created a new quality in contrast to the sensual and material forms. From the mid-1960s onwards, to depict the relationship between figures and space, he created metal sculptures in which he contrasted the indeterminate outlines of figures with a solid geometric structure. It was at this time that he discovered the work of Alberto Giacometti, which in his own work marked a turn towards personal experience, inwardness and sensual unsteadiness. His artistic style became more open and loosely related to surrealism (Homage to Chirico, 1963) or existentialism. The connection between the human figure and the puppet, which he had been considering for a long time, was made clear to him by Giorgio de Chirico. Janoušek installed some of his sculptures in a metal construction that enclosed the outer space. The linear order of the vire cage symbolized law, while the organic shape inside was a manifestation of randomness. At the same time, the construction grew through the figure and transferred its inner state to the outside (One Day, or The Tenant, 1965).

Janoušek's welded sculptures, in which he highlighted their existential dimension and emphasised the role of individual freedom as a prerequisite for creation, represent a new level of expression. Using the technique of welding, he arrived at magical figures, similar to the figures in the paintings of František Janoušek or Václav Tikal, consisting of ephemeral imagery (Lyrical Creature, 1966). Sculptures such as Unexpected Guest (1966) represented a fundamental departure from his original work, which was characterised by a distinct structure and order. In contrast to the static balance of his previous work, an element of movement gradually began to appear in his works, to the point of its incorporation into the sculpture. This was not only a formal question, but a subjective experience of time in relation to its objective scope. The central point of the sculpture became a pivot on which the pendulum, or axis of reversal, was fixed, allowing the sculpture to swing.

From the second half of the 1960s, he created interactive sculptures with mobile elements in the form of pendulums, or small kinetic sculptures made of moving elements (Table Pendulum, 1966, Blue Pendulum, 1967). The pendulums brought Janoušek's work closer to contemporary tendencies of kinetic art, but their binding to a static base also limited him. Behind the modernist appearance of his sculptures, unacceptable to many, there were always primary artistic laws that he trusted. Apollinaire's short story The Prague Pedestrian inspired him to create the sculpture The Eternal Pedestrian - Isaac Laquedem (1966), which uses the motion of a pendulum to measure not only his time, but also ours. A lighter, even caricaturing sculpture on the same theme is Modern Man Measures His Time (1966). The theme of time in the form of a pendulum is also represented by other sculptures from the same period (Last Hour, Yesterday, Today, Tomorrow, Time, Figure with Time Motif, all from 1966). The sculpture Untitled (Pendulum) (1967-1969), depicting a seated figure without a chair with its head turned downwards, which cannot be returned to its natural position, expresses Janoušek's inner feeling of the perversity of values.

Of existential significance, related to the sudden illness and premature death of his mother, is the sculpture Pendulum I (1965), consisting of two black squares, the front of which is set in motion by a pendulum in the shape of a scythe. Pendulums that appeared in Czech poetic poetry (V. Nezval: Prisoner-Madrigal, František Halas: Flood-Hunger) or in surrealist paintings by J. Štyrský, F. Janoušek, B. Lacina or F. Zykmund, became a metaphor of human finitude. Janoušek's pendulums were not set in motion by any mechanism and counted on the participation of the viewer. In addition to Janoušek, Radoslav Kratina's variables or some Karel Nepraš´s sculptures equipped with bearings and a crank (Feel free to rotate) had a similar purpose.

A solitary work is the sculpture A Piece of Earth (1969), covered by wrinkled relief of an imaginary landscape. Its static is disturbed by thin iron rods of hidden pendulums inside, that animate the dead matter with their movement like the pulse of the earth. It is not a purely abstract work, but a personal reflection of the artist's experience of the end of the war. The sculpture is also the starting point for the next series of flat reliefs composed of elements mounted on a vertical panel, of which the opening Iron Landscape (1969) represents a fundamental shift in the composition of Janoušek's works.

Janoušek's multi-figure metal sculpture The Threat of War (3 x 14 m) for the Expo 70 in Osaka, which depicted a crowd of apocalyptic militant figures marching with guns pointed at the Czechoslovak pavilion from the neighbouring Soviet pavilion, was fatal for him. A reminder of the inexorability of time was embodied by the movement of his four-metre pendulum, which culminated in a section of the Czech exposition called Time of Anxiety. Janoušek used gears to ensure that the pendulum was synchronised with the rhythm of an old historical bell, which rang twice a minute. The 1970 Expo was opened by two sculptors, Vladimir Janoušek and Tarō Okamoto, a member of Abstraction-Création, who created the informal logo of the entire exhibition, the sculpture Tower of the Sun. The Czechoslovac government's Commission for Exhibition Industry and the relevant department of the Foreign Ministry described the management of the exhibition as a "centre of anti-socialist elements", did not allow other artists to travel to the Expo '70, and the sculptures and pavilion remained in Japan when the exhibition was closed. At the same time, Vladimír Janoušek created another monumental sculpture Metalworkers and Metallurgists (10 figures, 3.5 x 8.5 x 1.8 m) for the cultural house in Kladno, but due to the political situation of the emerging "normalization" (according to official document Lessons from the Crisis Development, issued by the Communist party) it was no longer allowed to be installed in its original place and remained in the garden of his studio in Košíře.

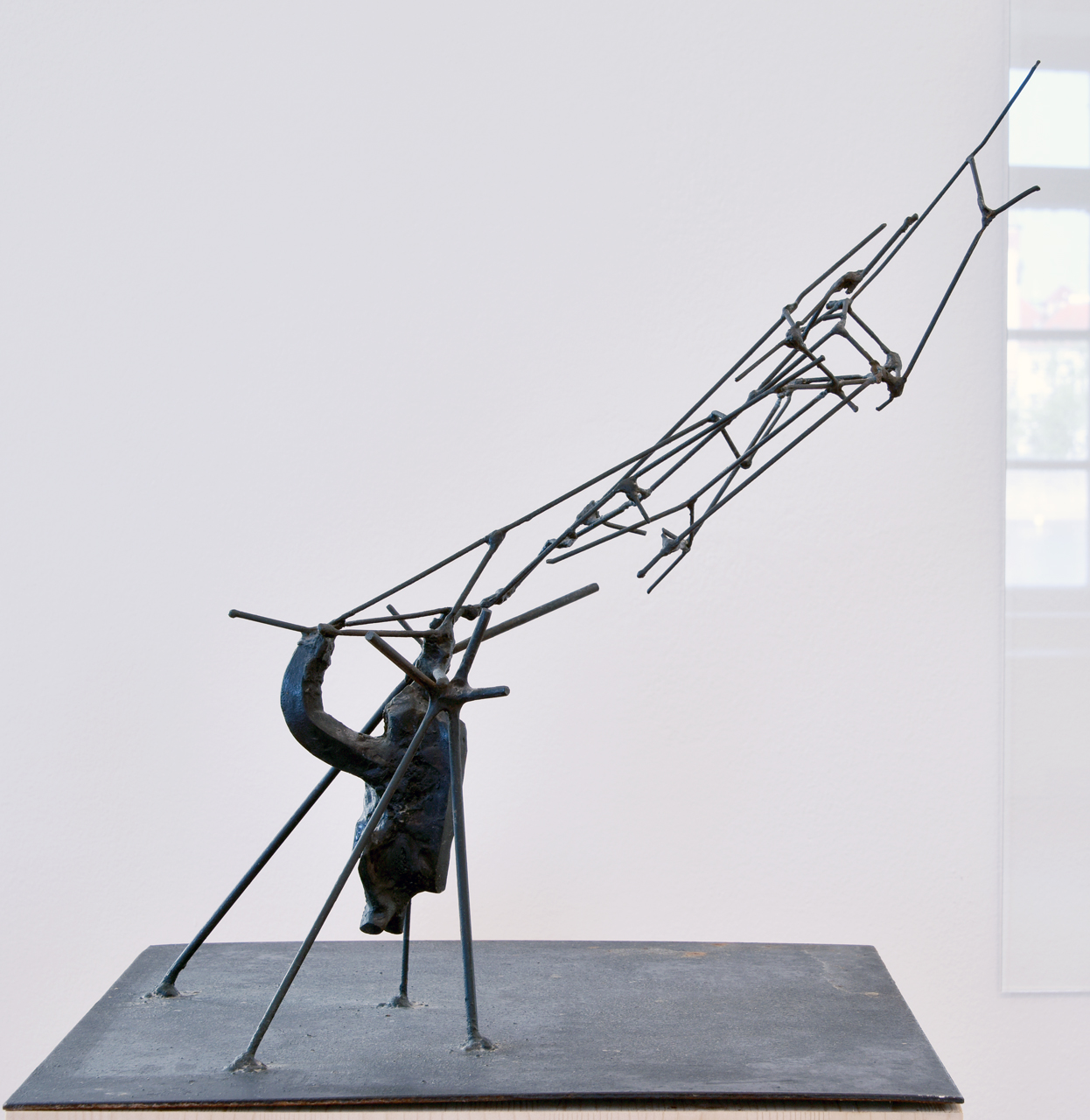
Untitled (Pendulum) (1967-1969)

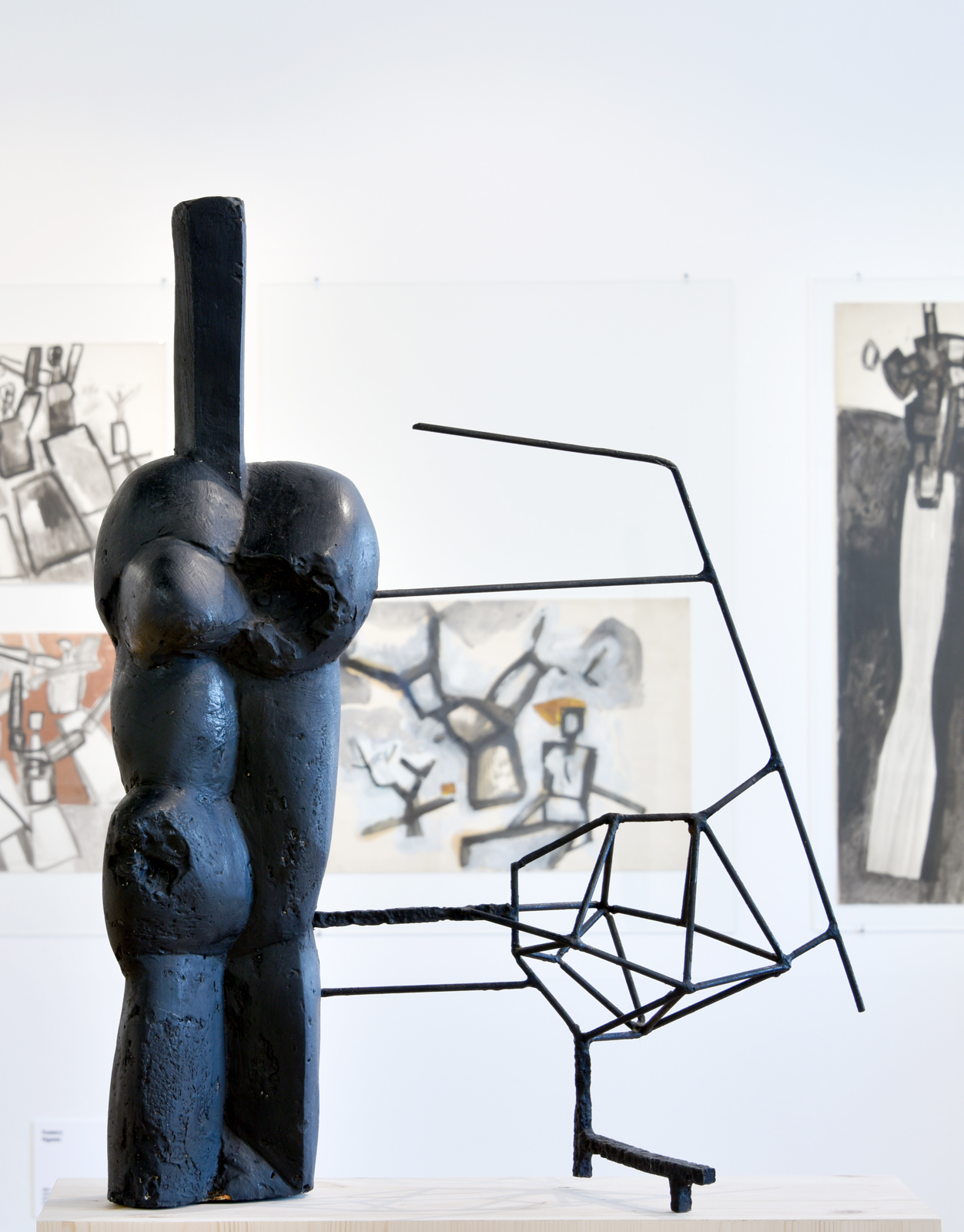
Figure with the construction of a dog (1964)

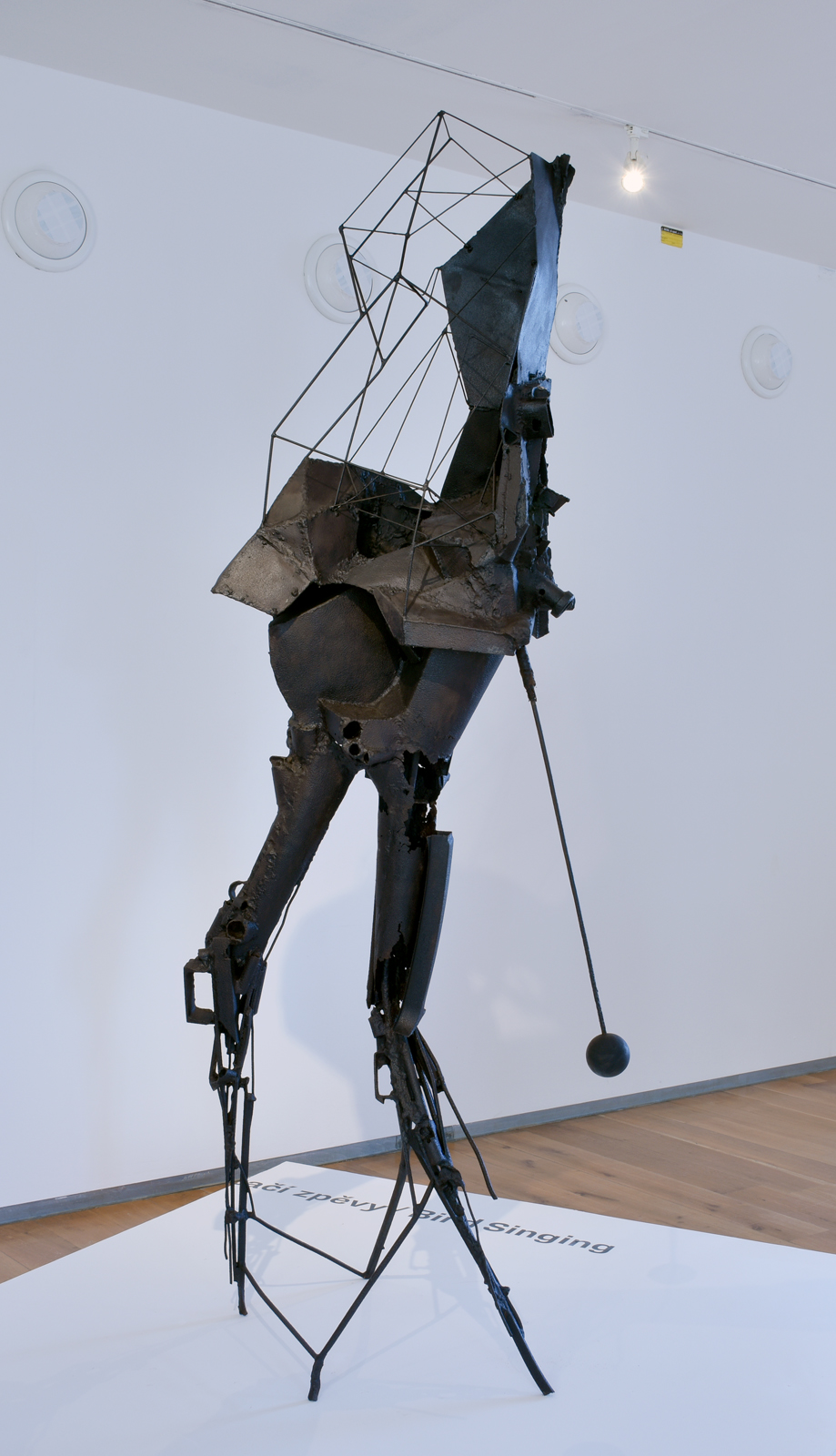
The Eternal Pedestrian - Isaac Laquedem (1966)

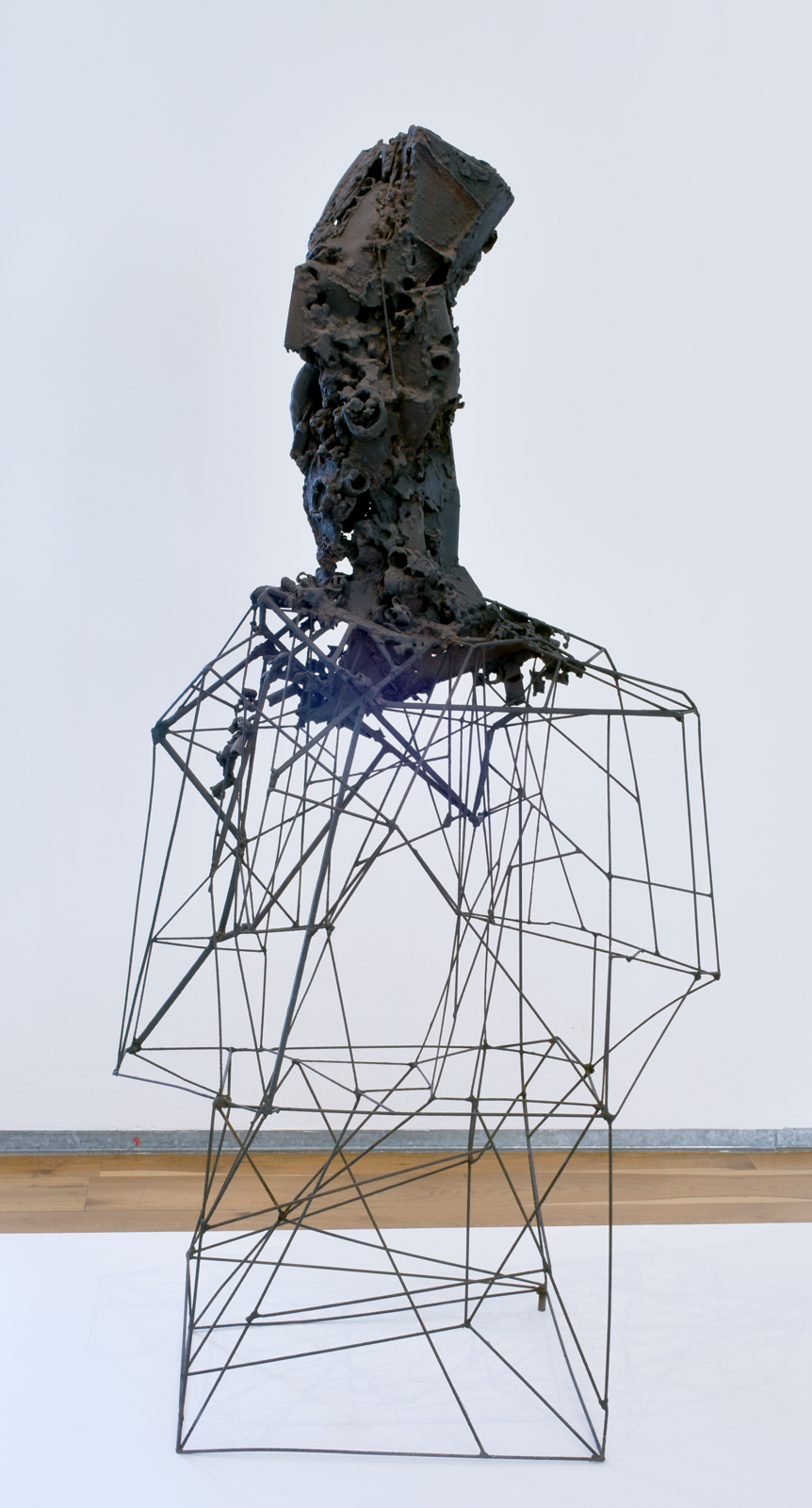
Self portrait (1966)

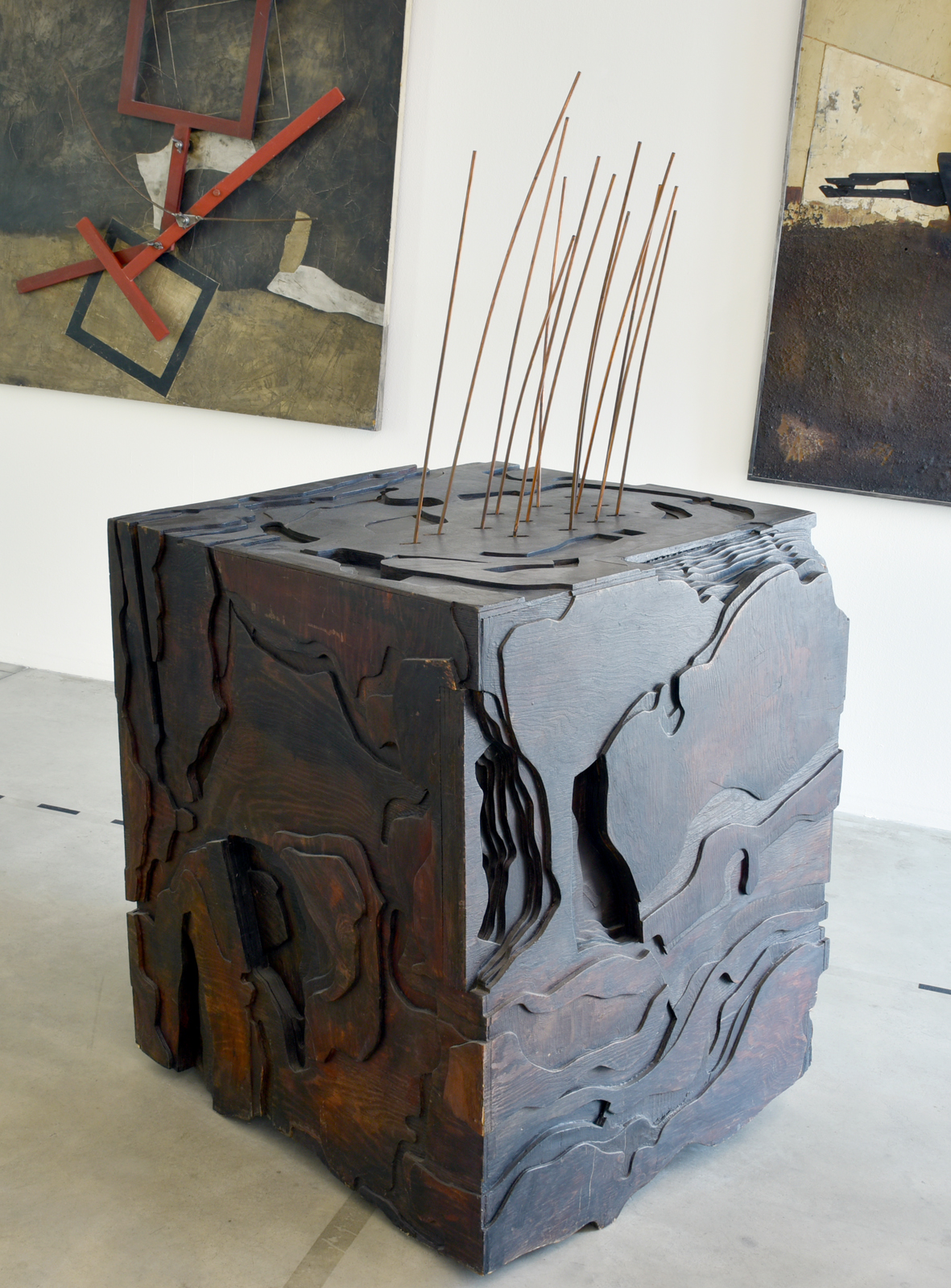
A Piece of Earth (1969–1970)

=== 1970–1986 ===
After 1970, Vladimír Janoušek lost any opportunity to exhibit and accepted an offer from his classmate, director Václav Lohniský, to collaborate with the S.K. Neumann Theatre (masks for Oedipus Rex, set design for The Merchant of Venice). Thanks to the favour of architects, he was able to realise some commissions for public spaces outside Prague (Kladno, Havlíčkův Brod, Prostějov, Jablůnka, Třebíč, Olomouc, Most, Czechoslovak Cultural Centre Berlin). He concentrated on sculptural work in his studio in Prague and in Vidonice and returned to drawing and painting. His figural studies from the early 1970s are often polychromed (Studies for Public Sculpture, 1972). His monumental multi-figure sculpture Metalworkers and Metallurgists, for which he was contracted together with the architect Václav Hilský, had a moving fate. It was intended for the House of Culture of metallurgical plant SONP Kladno. After it went through the approval process, Janoušek spent almost three years on its creation and finally, until 1974, he tried in vain to have it installed. He postponed a number of designs for public competitions because his name alone became a reason for elimination by the jury. He dealt with projects for the placement of sculptures in the landscape as well as an architectural and artistic reclamation of the North Bohemian landscape, devastated by mining (a relief in the Municipal Theatre in Most).

His 1969 relief Iron Landscape represents a departure from the welded sculptures of the 1960s and an oscillation between sculpture and painting (painting-cum-relief). Although the surface is loosely placed in space, there is an obvious painterly interest, which is evident in the emphasis on the surface and outline of the individual parts. The variability of the arrangement and layering of the surface became the new formal elements of his works. Janoušek's pictorial reliefs after 1970 have backgrounds treated with paint, drawing, engraving and sand structures and movable parts made of steel and aluminium sheet, plywood, fiberboard or plexiglas. They are connected by screws, swinging hinges and fastened with rods and strings (Construction, 1976, Construction in the Landscape, 1978). The transition from pendulums to layered reliefs was foreshadowed by paintings of landscapes with abysses and pre-set constructions with pendulums (Pendulum with Pendulum, 1969, Pendulum on the Horizon, 1970, Pendulum in a Frame, 1972) and reliefs depicting hands with movable parts attached by hinges (Painter, 1975). One of the first variable works made of layered metal sheets is The Guard (1977), where the only moving element is a slat that he holds in his hand. Janoušek's works from this period are difficult to classify into traditional categories - the sculptures are constructed essentially in a drawing manner, but their common element is movement, which has a meaning-making function. After his forced withdrawal into privacy, one of the themes became closure (Window/Mirror, 1978). His reliefs were also loosely related to the civilism of Group 42 and especially to František Gross, in whose paintings urban realities intertwine with the human figure as grotesque tragic mechanisms.

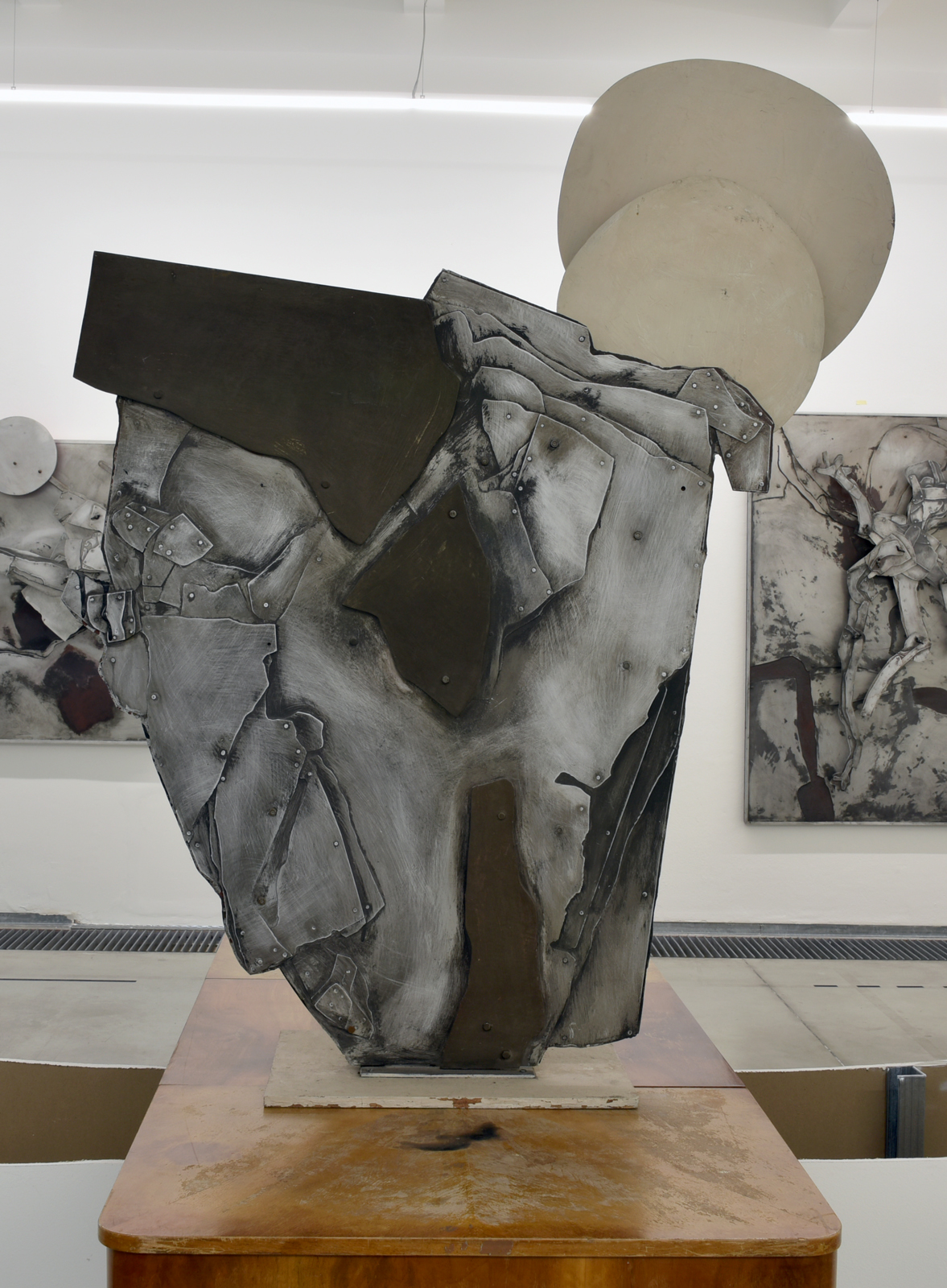
Iron landscape - Landscape with Moving Stones (1969)

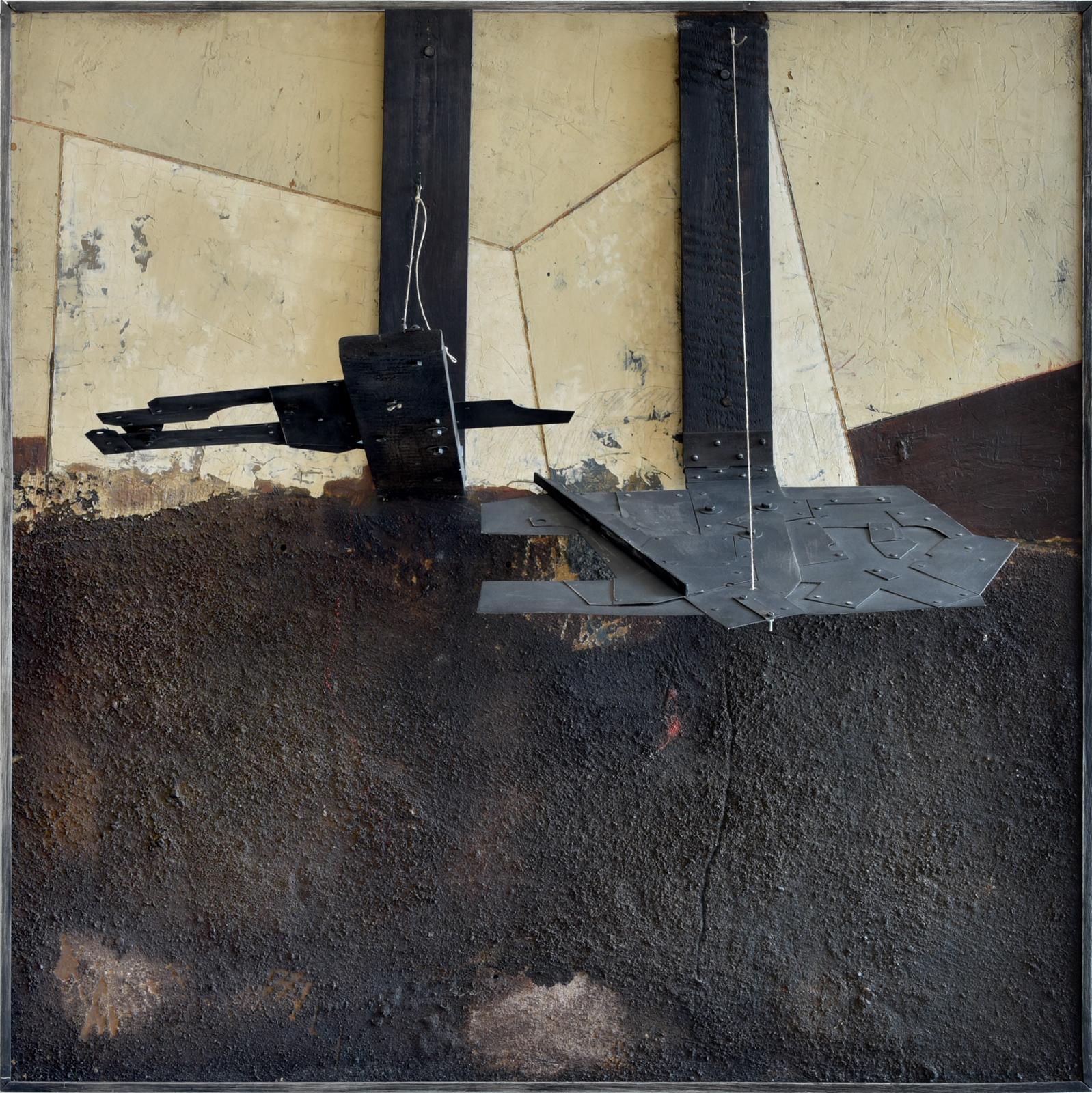
Construction (1976)

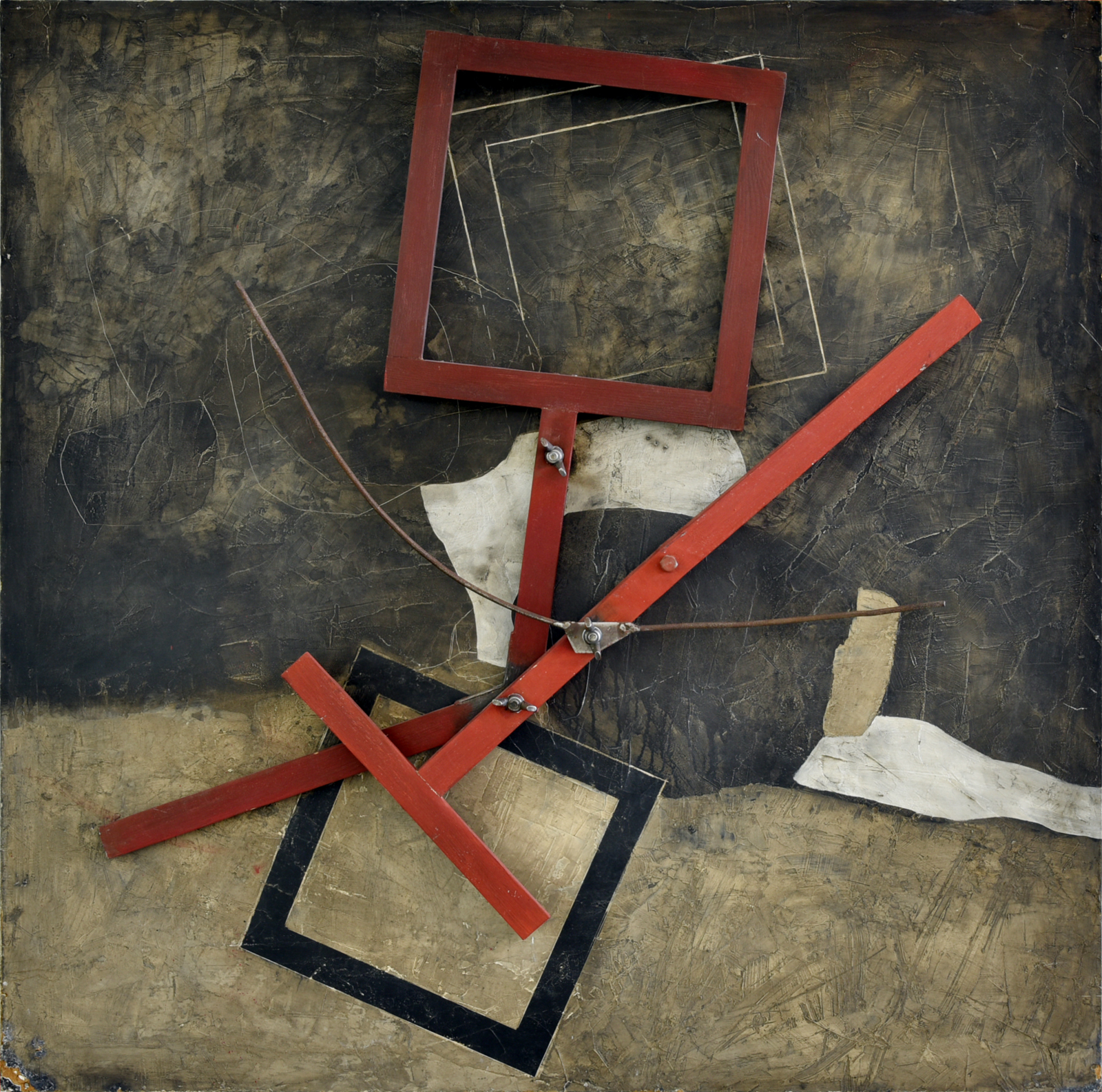
Construction in the landscape I (1978)

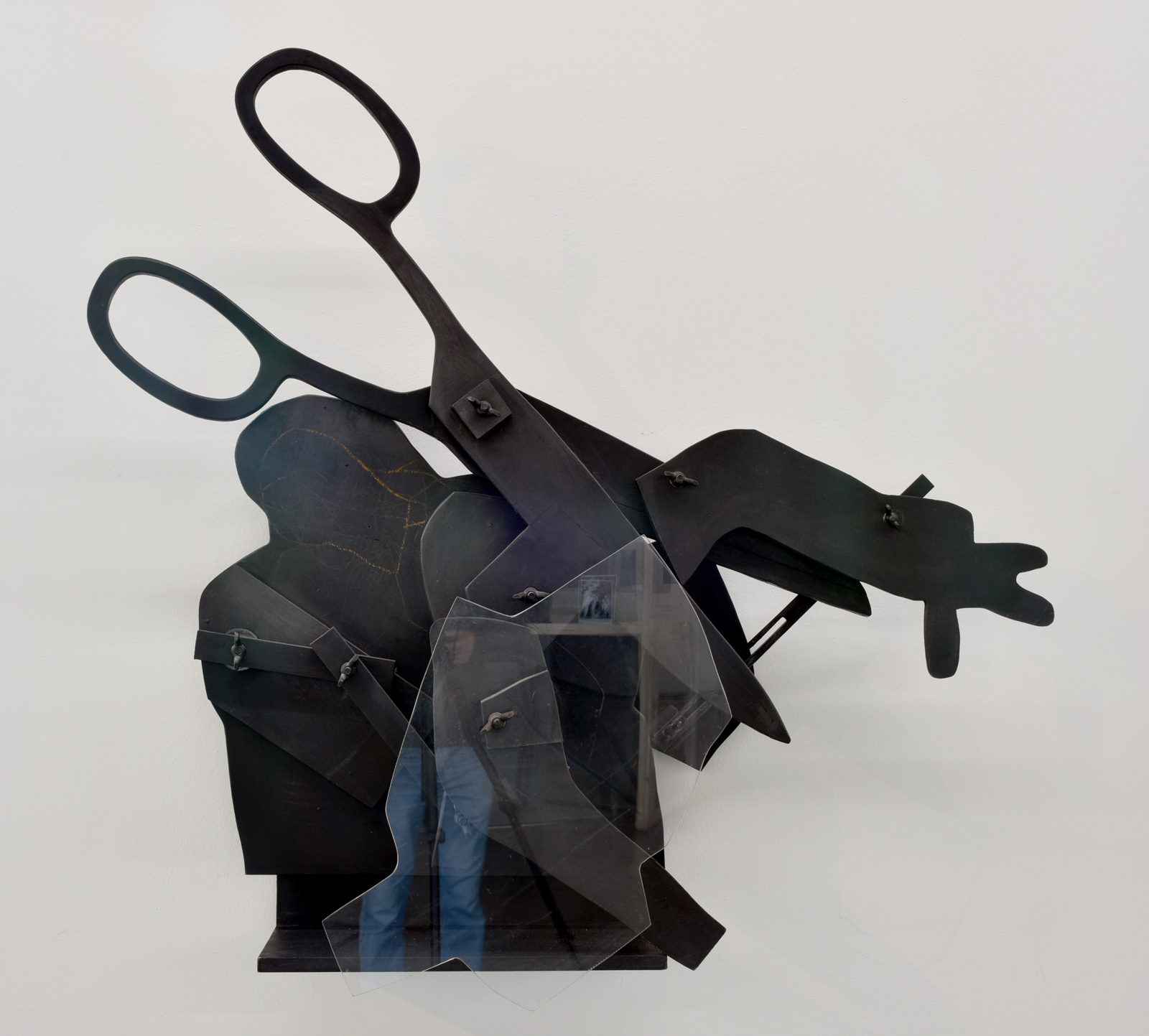
Aseptic removal of hand (1984)

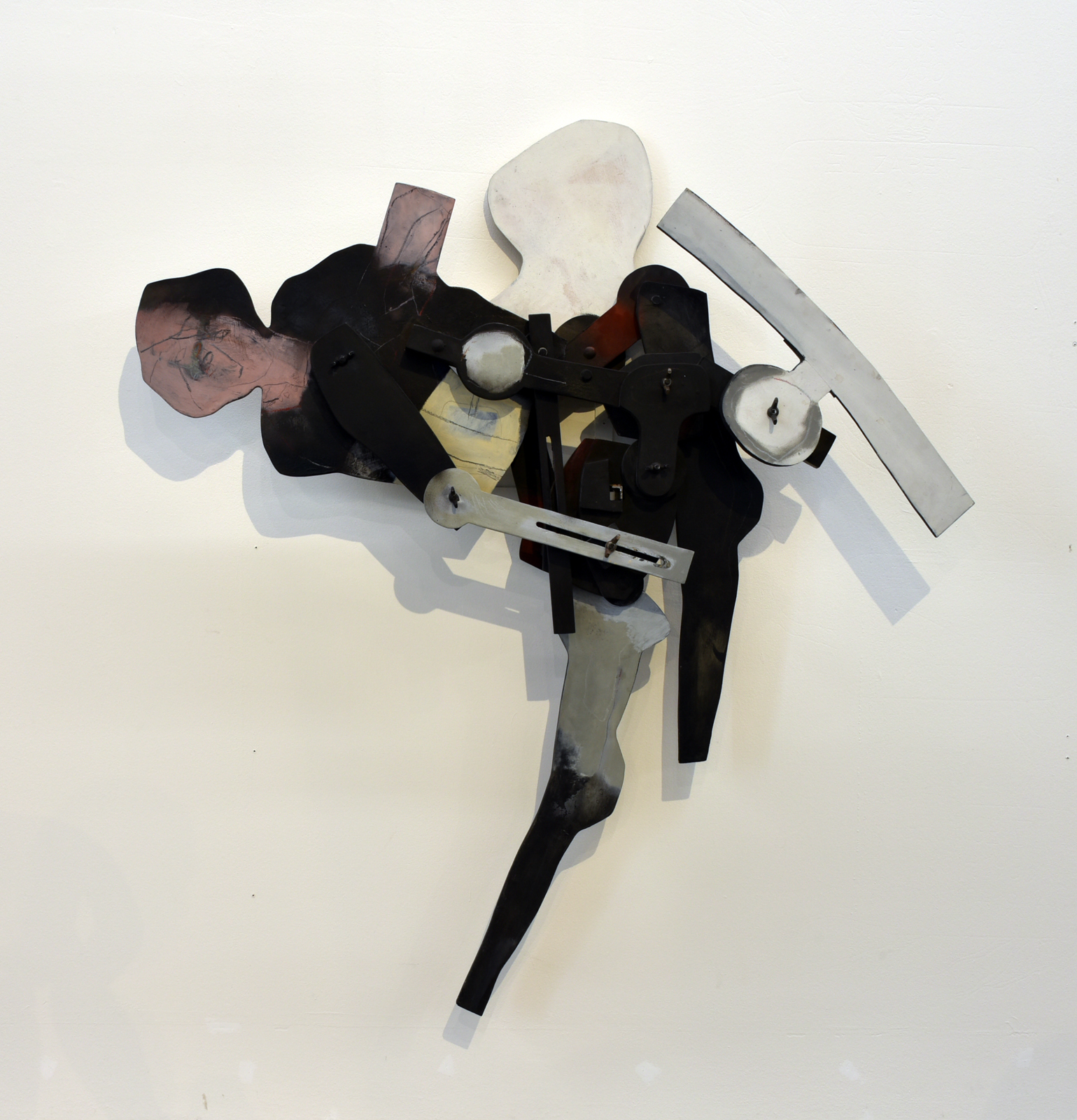
Pink figure (1985–1986)

In the culminating phase of his work, the sculptor replaced moving parts with spatial variation. Janoušek counted on the active participation of the viewer in moving the pendulums and decided to offer him the possibility of changing the shape and overall arrangement of the sculpture in order to activate his perception. He thus created a completely unique arrangement in hanging panels with variable figural works that cannot be described as paintings or as reliefs in their original sense. They can also be described as sculptures intended for a single view or sculptural paintings conceived in planar form that have both sculptural details and defined space.

His sculptures, composed most often of pieces of aluminum sheet and joined by screws in parallel layers, some with sliding rails, sometimes fixed against a background with an imaginary landscape and framed, offer the viewer their own interpretations in accordance with the sculptor's wish to engage them as potential creators. The moving parts offer a seemingly infinite number of variations without altering the sculpture's meaning (The Fall - Icarus, 1986). Some of these were conceived as projects for monumental sculptures placed above the horizon in the landscape, but external political circumstances did not allow him to realise his ideas. He applied his painterly sensibility to them by combining metal, wood and later plexiglas and by sanding and patinating sheet metal to achieve a plastic effect.

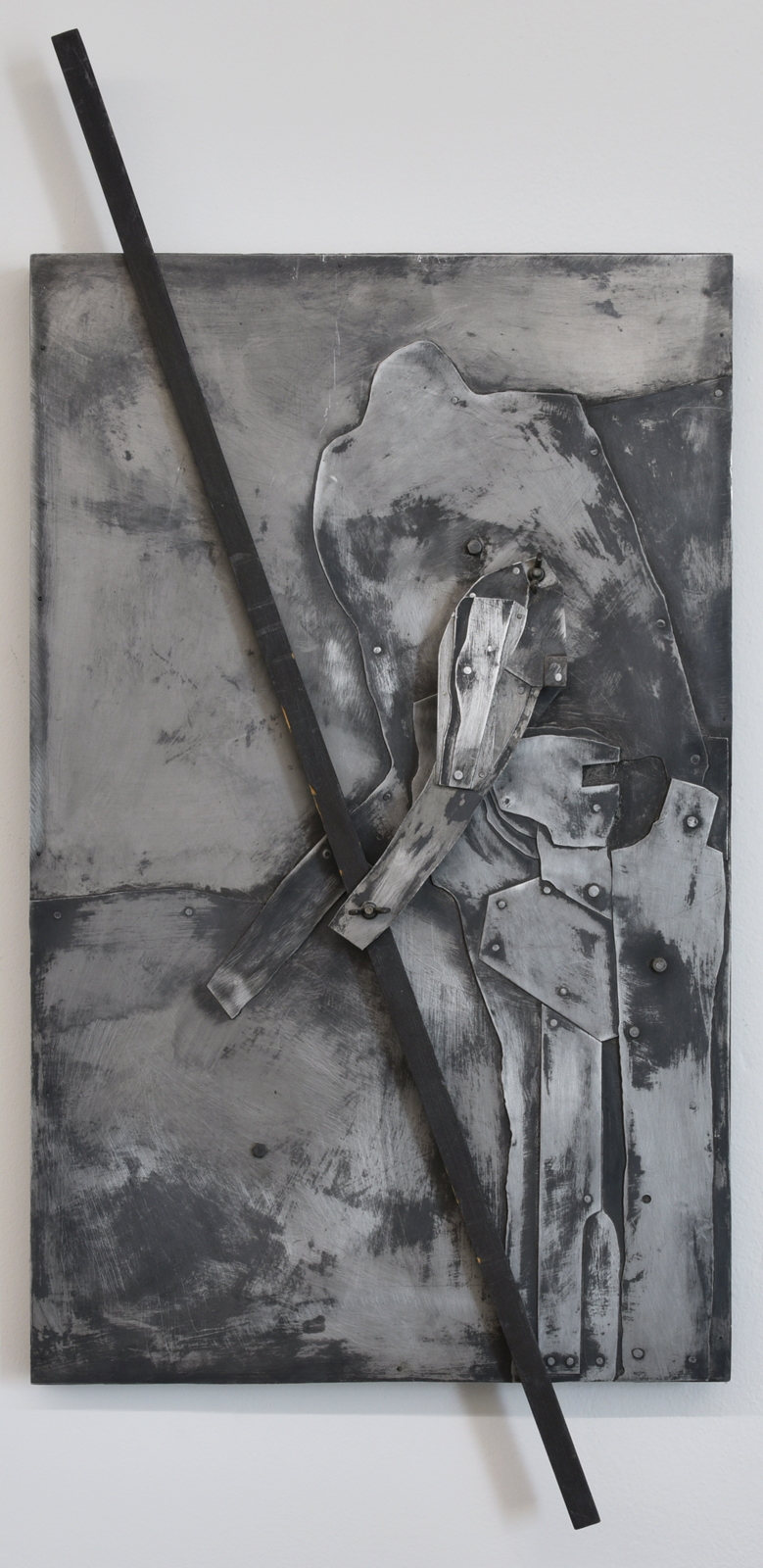
Untitled - Guardian (1975)

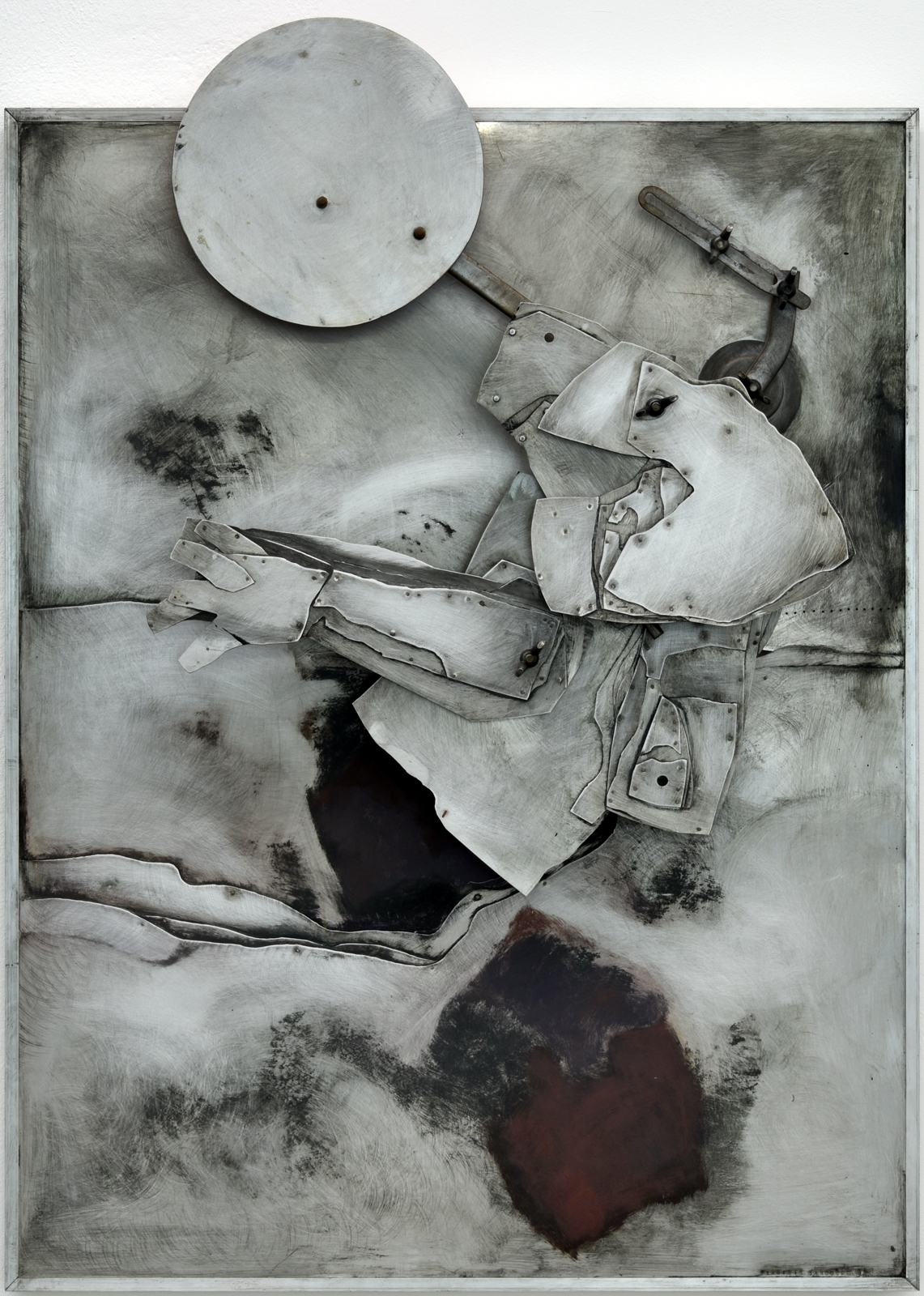
White Night (1977), National Gallery Prague

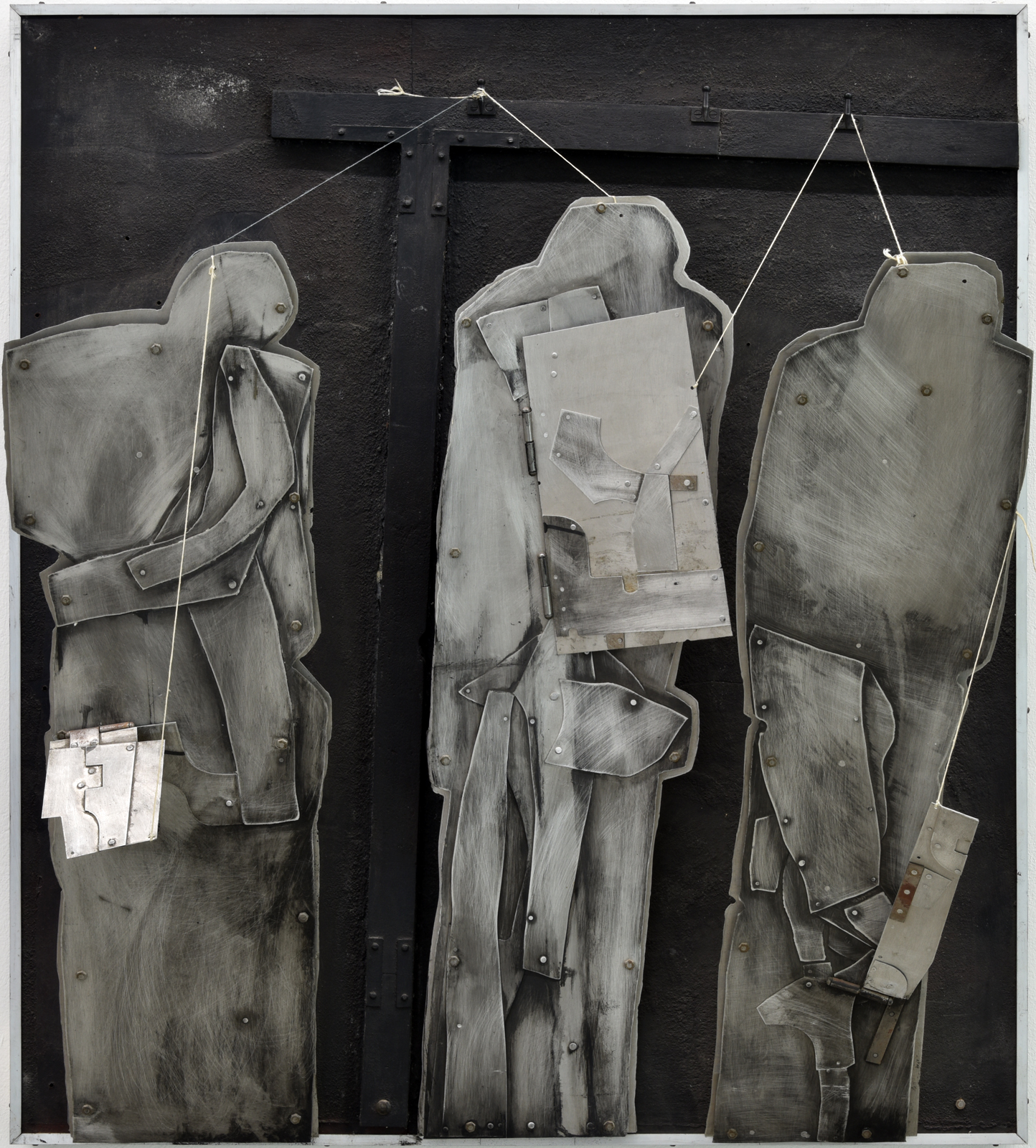
Real event (1978), East Bohemian Gallery Pardubice

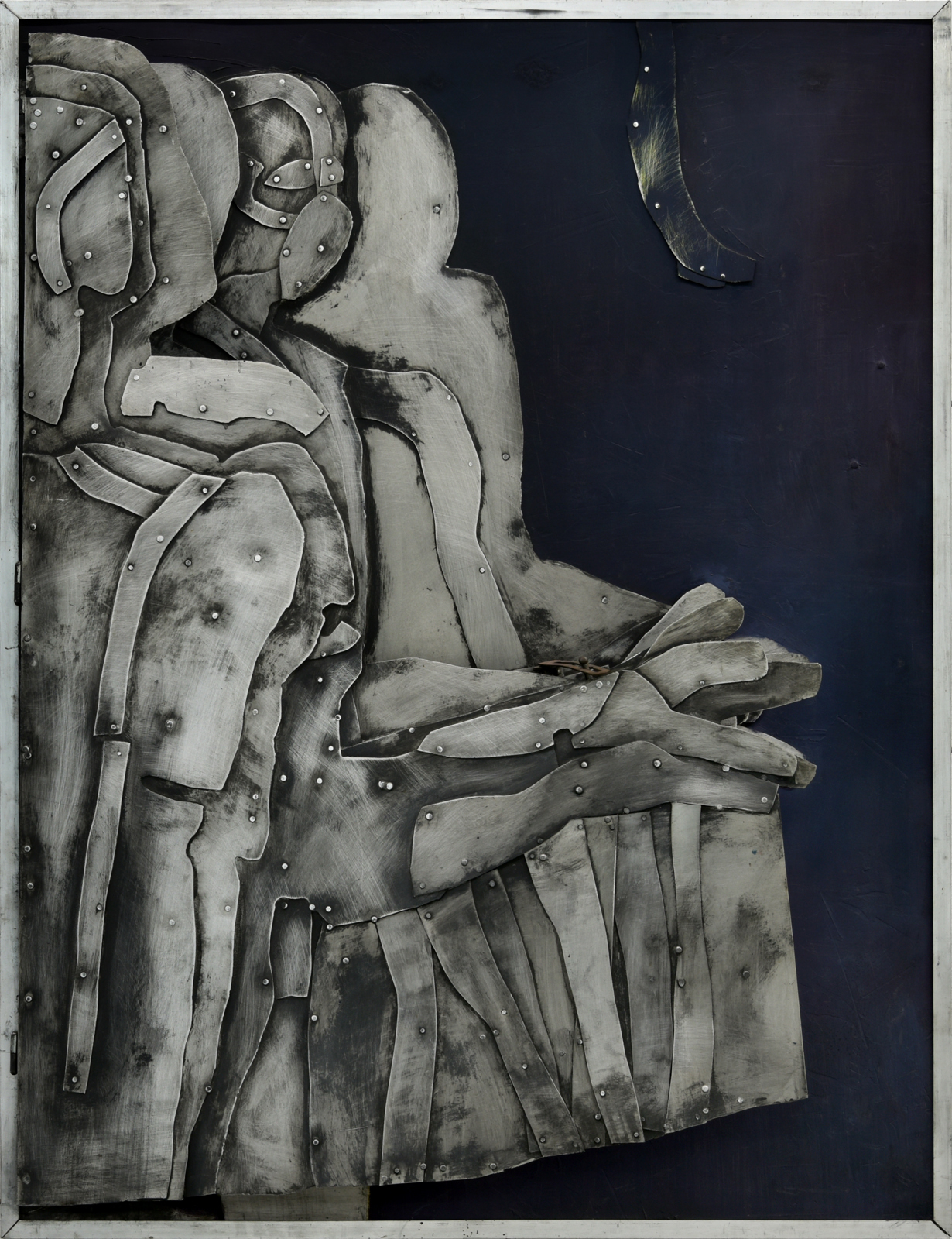
Host I (1979), Moravian Gallery Brno

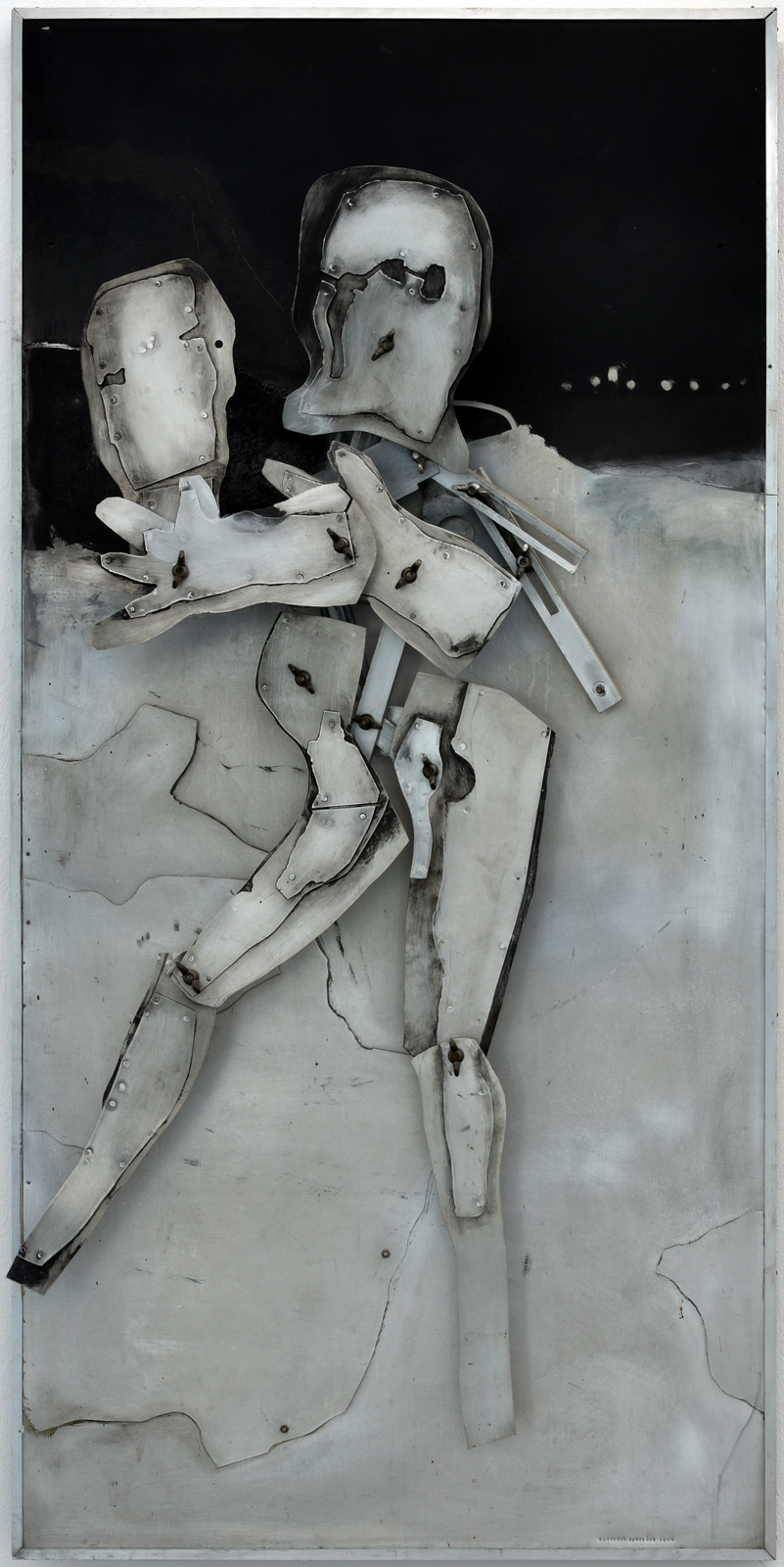
The Juggler (1977)

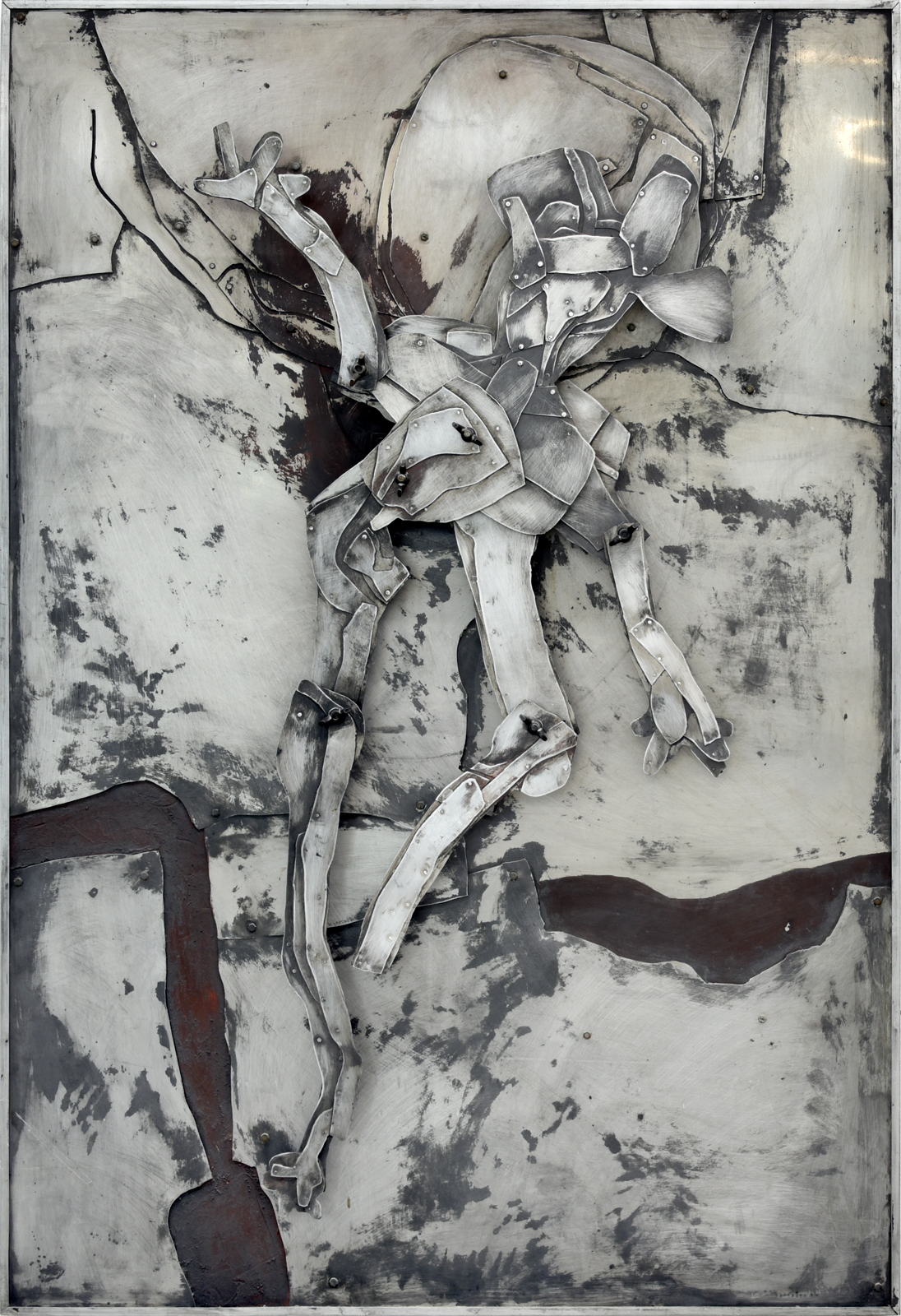
Till Eulenspiegel (1978)

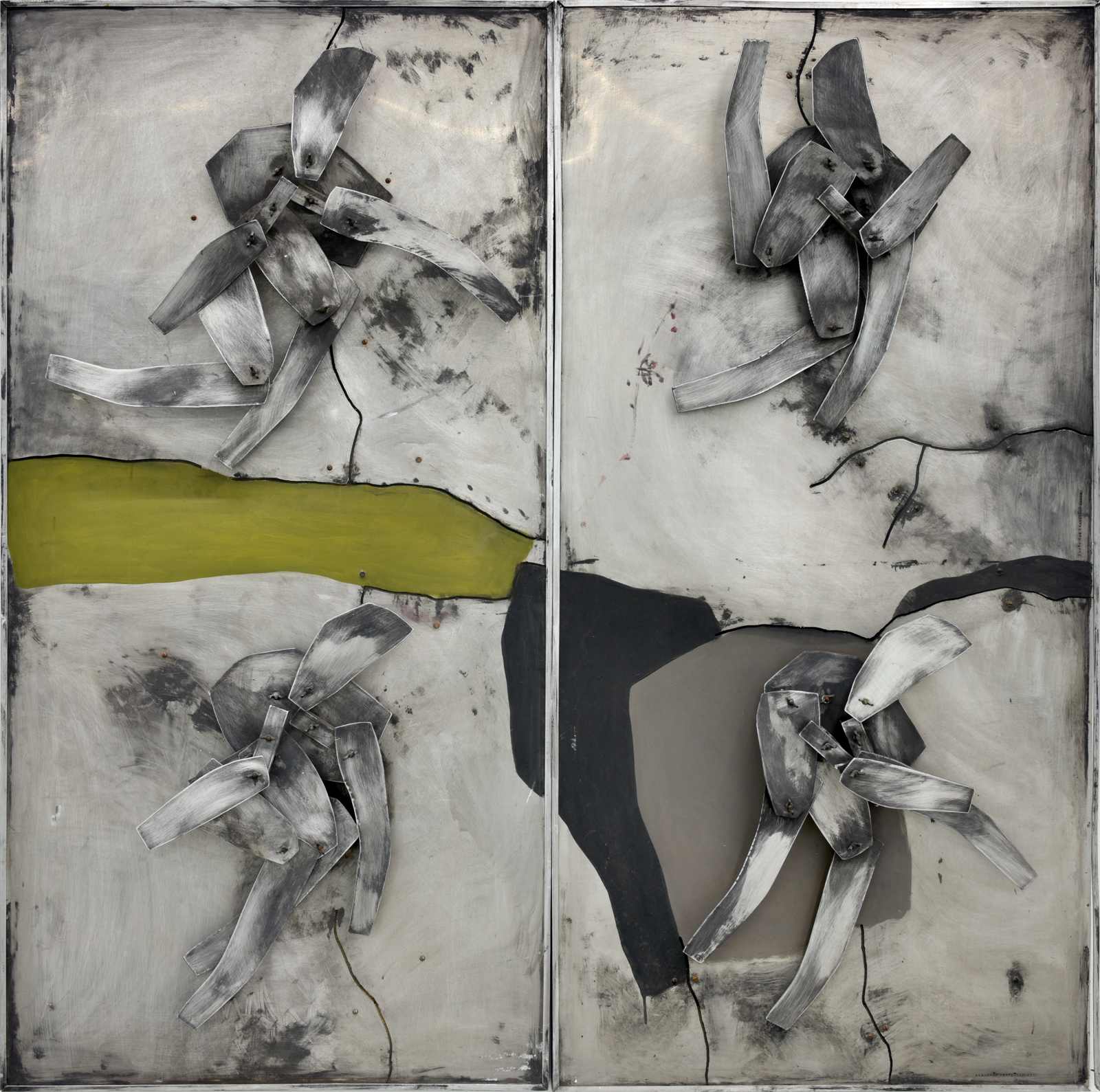
Four Days of František Icarus (1979)

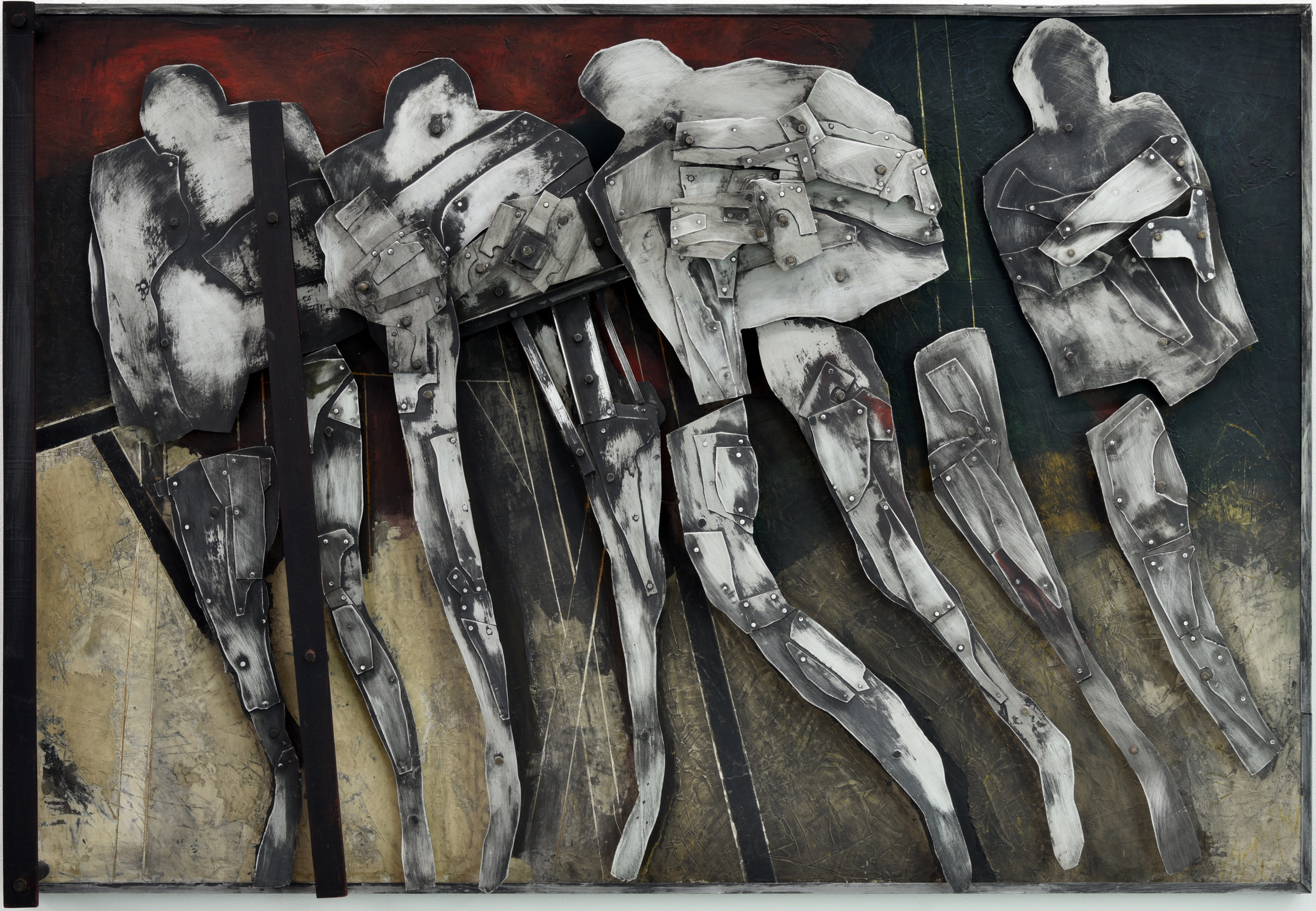
Blind Men (1980), Prague City Gallery

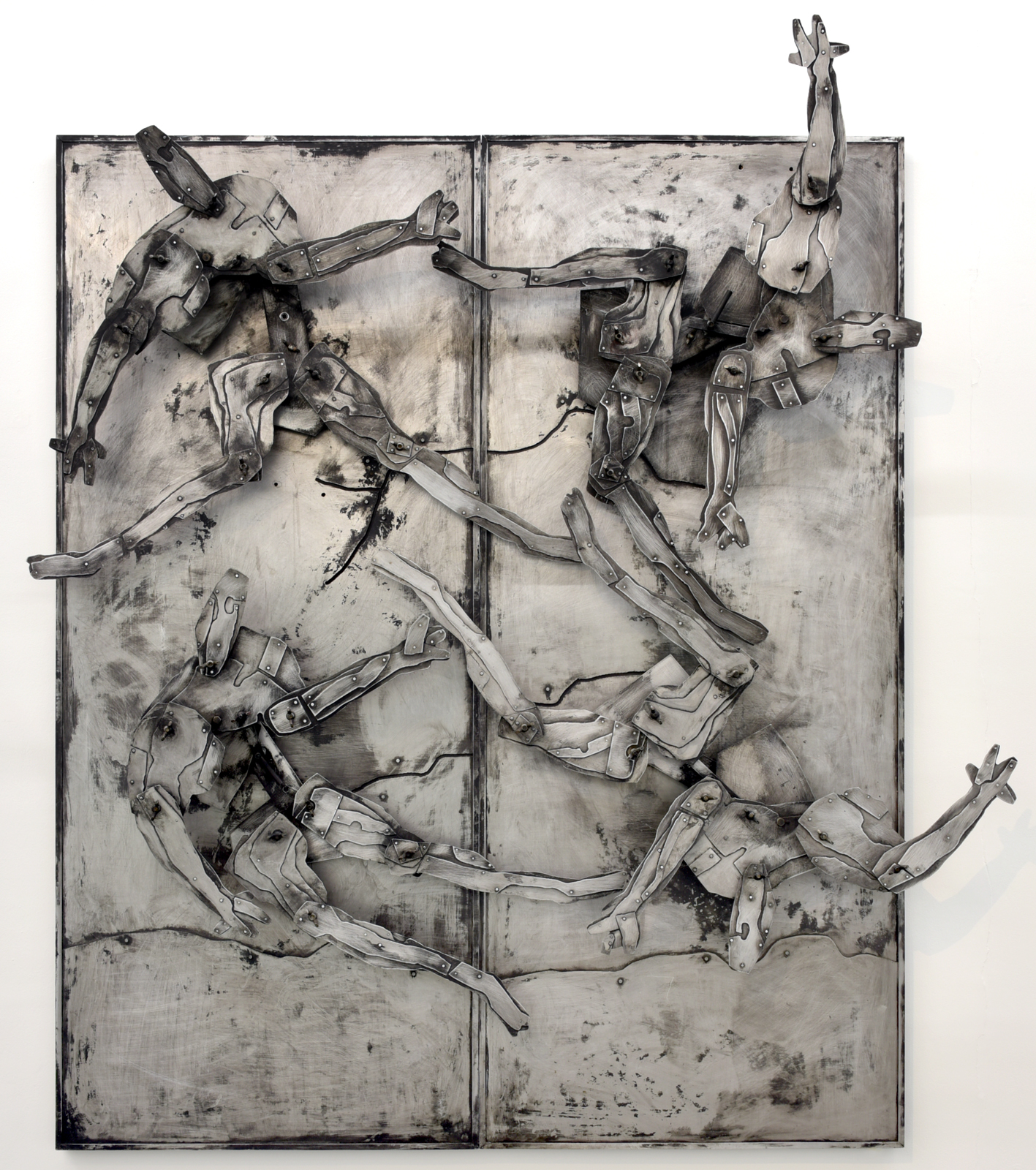
Four Jugglers (1983), National Gallery Prague

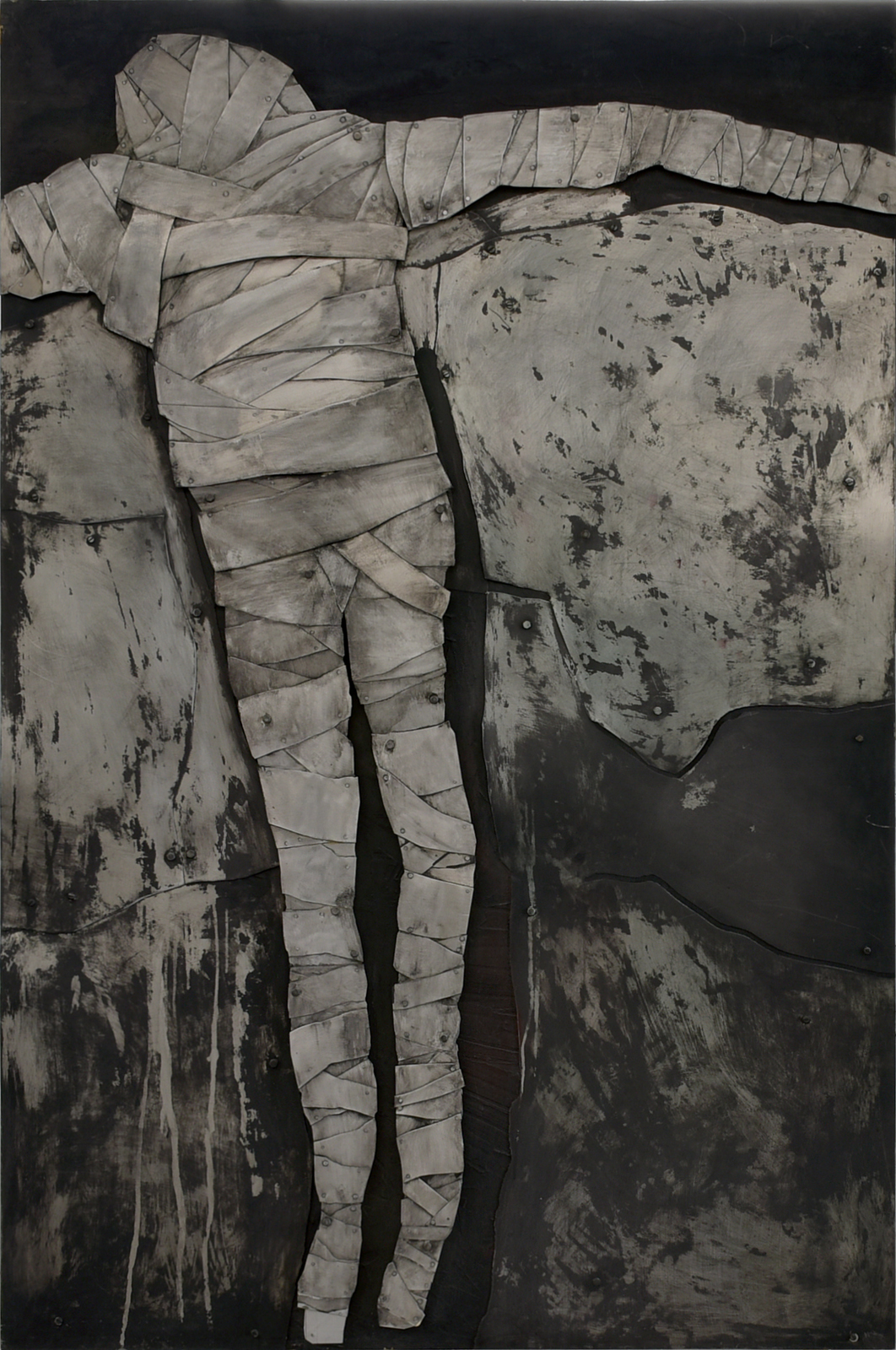
Suspended Figure (Bandaged Figure), 1983–1984, Regional Gallery Liberec

In the second half of the 1970s, existential themes predominate in Janoušek's work (The Fall, 1977, 1978, 1981, 1982, Four Days of František Icarus, 1979, Blind Men, 1980, One Hundred Instructions on How to Fall, 1981–1982). In his relief works, people have turned into mechanisms, into excluded and miserable individuals who are held together only by external supports. Janoušek uses them to incorporate his personal feelings into literary, mythological, biblical and philosophical stories, inviting the viewer to intervene in them and thus partly take their plight upon himself. A breakthrough work is The Juggler from 1977 - one of the first variables that allows the manipulation of the whole figure. Although the moving parts can be set in extreme and improbable poses, the basic shape is fixed - the fall cannot be changed into a take-off, and the fatalistic layout cannot be transcended. The figure is free from secondary details and is defined by the abstracted contour edge of the metal plate. In this and other works, there is a certain degree of self-identification of the author with the fate of the depicted figures. The assumed active participation of the viewer in the manipulation of the sculptures may turn harmony into disharmony, gracefulness into unsightliness, seriousness into grotesqueness, but no one can deny the author's intention. Although the variation invites playfulness, its scope is limited in advance and cannot disturb the work's originality. The reliefs are thus a visual manifestation of the First Manifesto of Permutationalism of the early 1960s, in which A. A. Moles states: the same number of elements can correspond to a large number of ways of combining them, thus separating material and form, separating the possible from the real, or expressing potentiality as an autonomous quantity.

In the 1980s, Janoušek's works were dominated by a sense of hopelessness and the theme of individual sacrifice (Ambush, 1982, Bad Event, 1983) and the conflicting encounter between the individual and totalitarian power (Figure with a Target, 1984). Violence has the character of an ordered act on an inconvenient individual. The motif of the murderer and his victim is expressed in the sculpture The Trial (1984), where the victim is represented by a figure that is a loose paraphrase of Christian Pietà. Although it refers to Kafka's The Trial, the sculpture is related to a specific incident in which Janoušek, at the age of almost 60, was summoned to a military inspection where he had to undress in the next room. The probable reason for the summons was an attempt by the StB to make copies of his apartment and studio keys. Ironic detachment and critical distance in Aseptic removal of the Hand (1984), alternates with a sense of artistic loneliness or self-reflection on inner struggle (Me Squared, 1985). Dark reliefs, complemented by black beams, are lightened by figures carved from plexiglas, which bring a new dimension by enhancing the lighting effects. After four months in the hospital, Janoušek created four more sculptures in 1986 in an accelerated creative upsurge, reflecting his experience between life and death (Figure with a Pendulum, Woman with a Pendulum, Scratch of a Pen, Last Fall). The very last sculpture by Janoušek, With a Scratch of a Pen (1986), reflects the ban on his prepared exhibition in Brno, which exhausted his last psychological strength and immediately preceded his death. Behind the black-painted cross of St. Andrew decompose the stumps of the torso that already belongs to the beyond.

Janoušek's variable sculptures are a super-personal parable about the end of every free-thinking person. Although they were created in enforced isolation, they were intended for public presentation, and the requirement of communicability and clarity precludes any ephemeral subjectivism. The utmost limit of Janoušek's artistic expression was the struggle with himself (Me Squared, 1985). The sculpture The Last Fall - Ikaros, created during the last months of his life, became his tombstone.

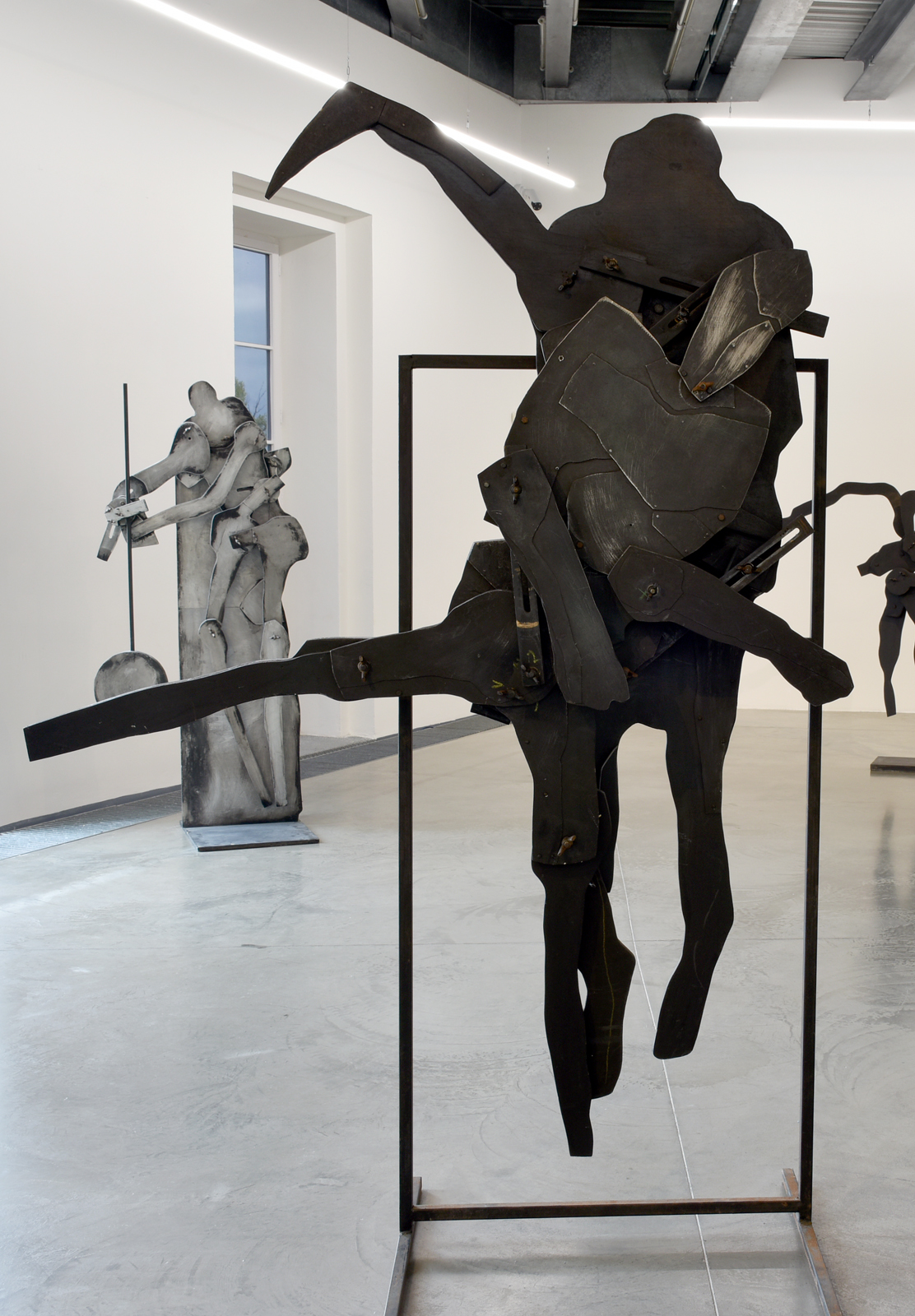
The Trial (1984), Česká pojišťovna

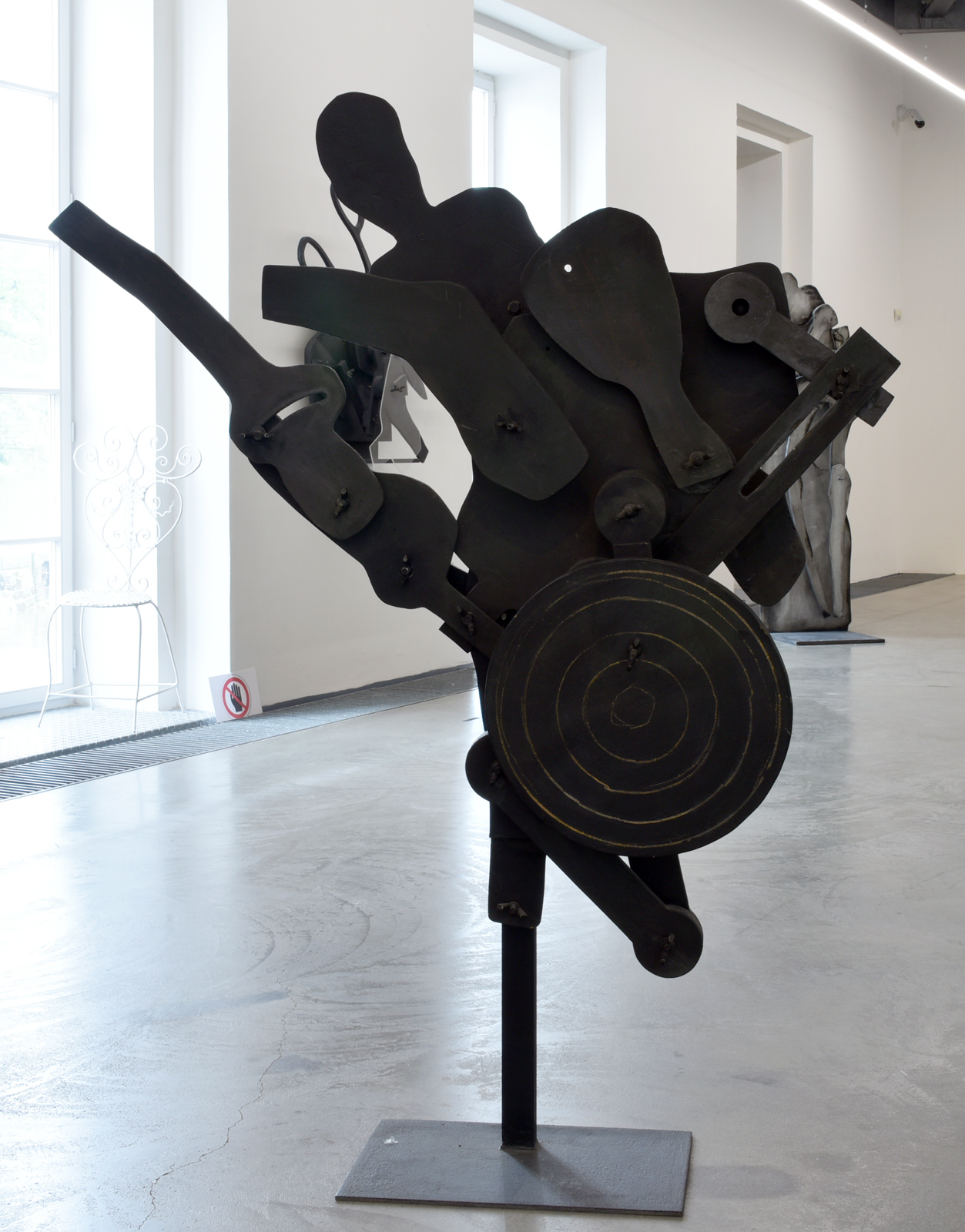
Figure with target (1984–1985), GASK Kutná Hora

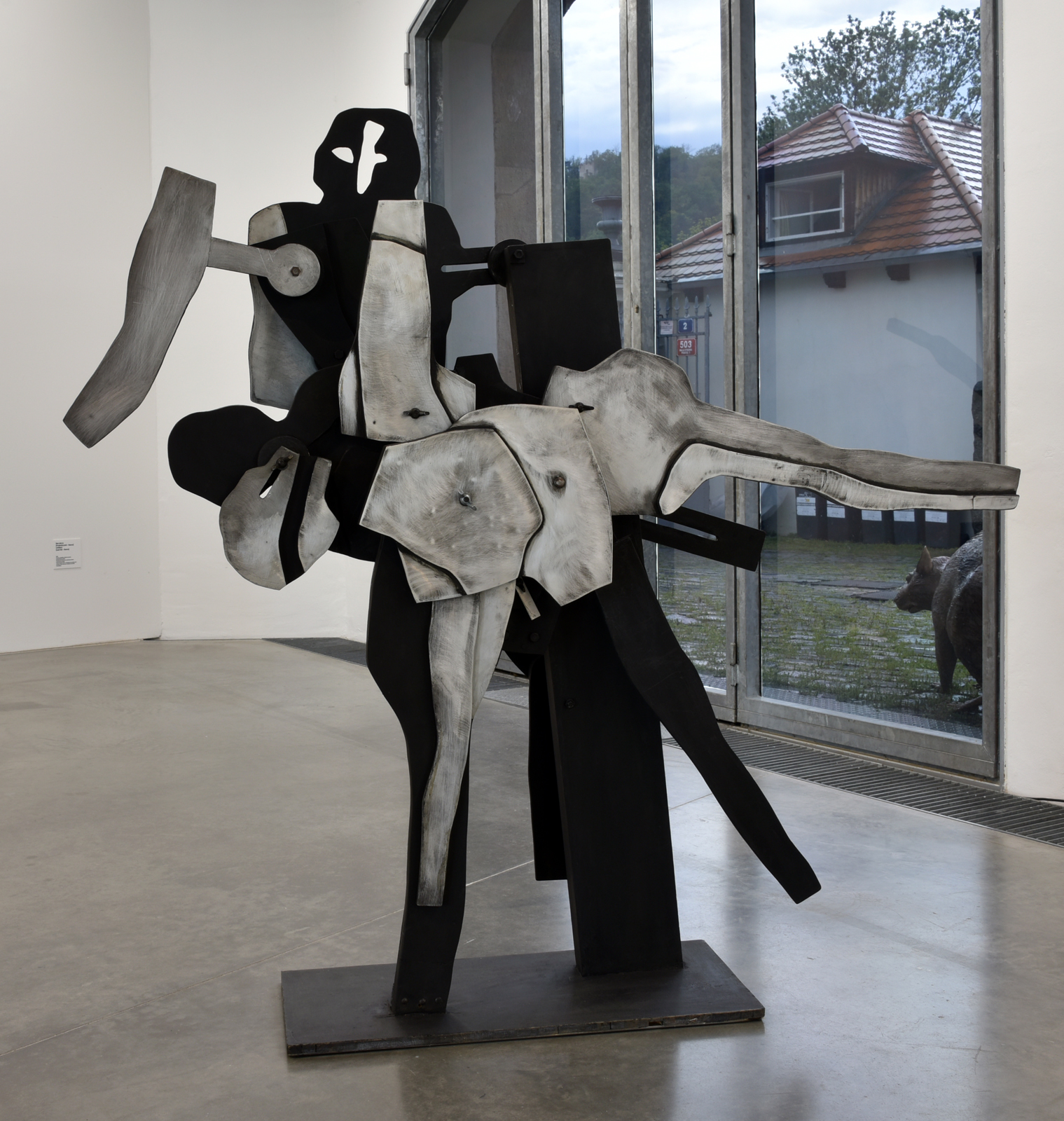
Vladimír Janoušek, (Me) Squared (1985)

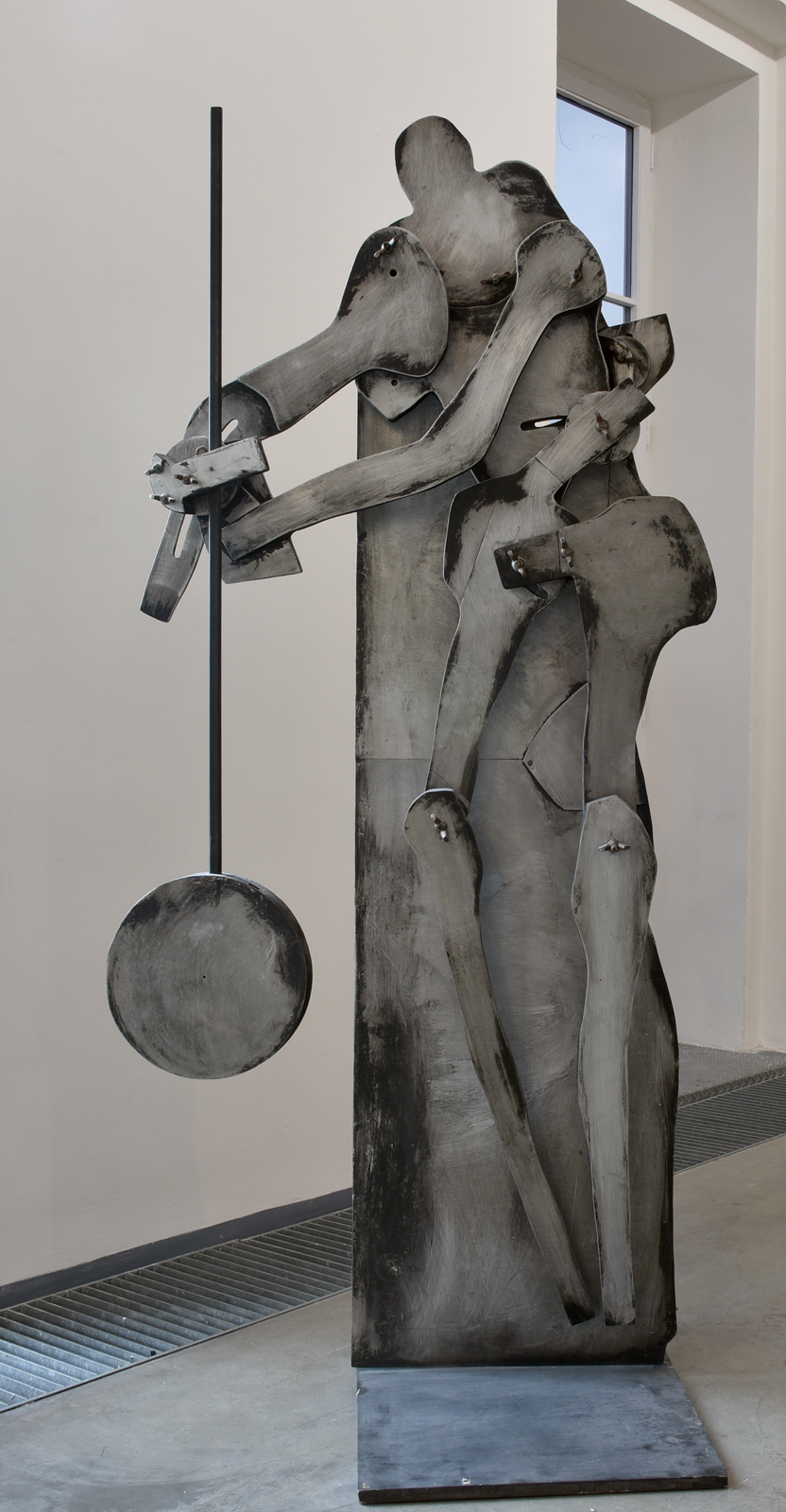
Figure with pendulum (1986), Galerie Dolmen

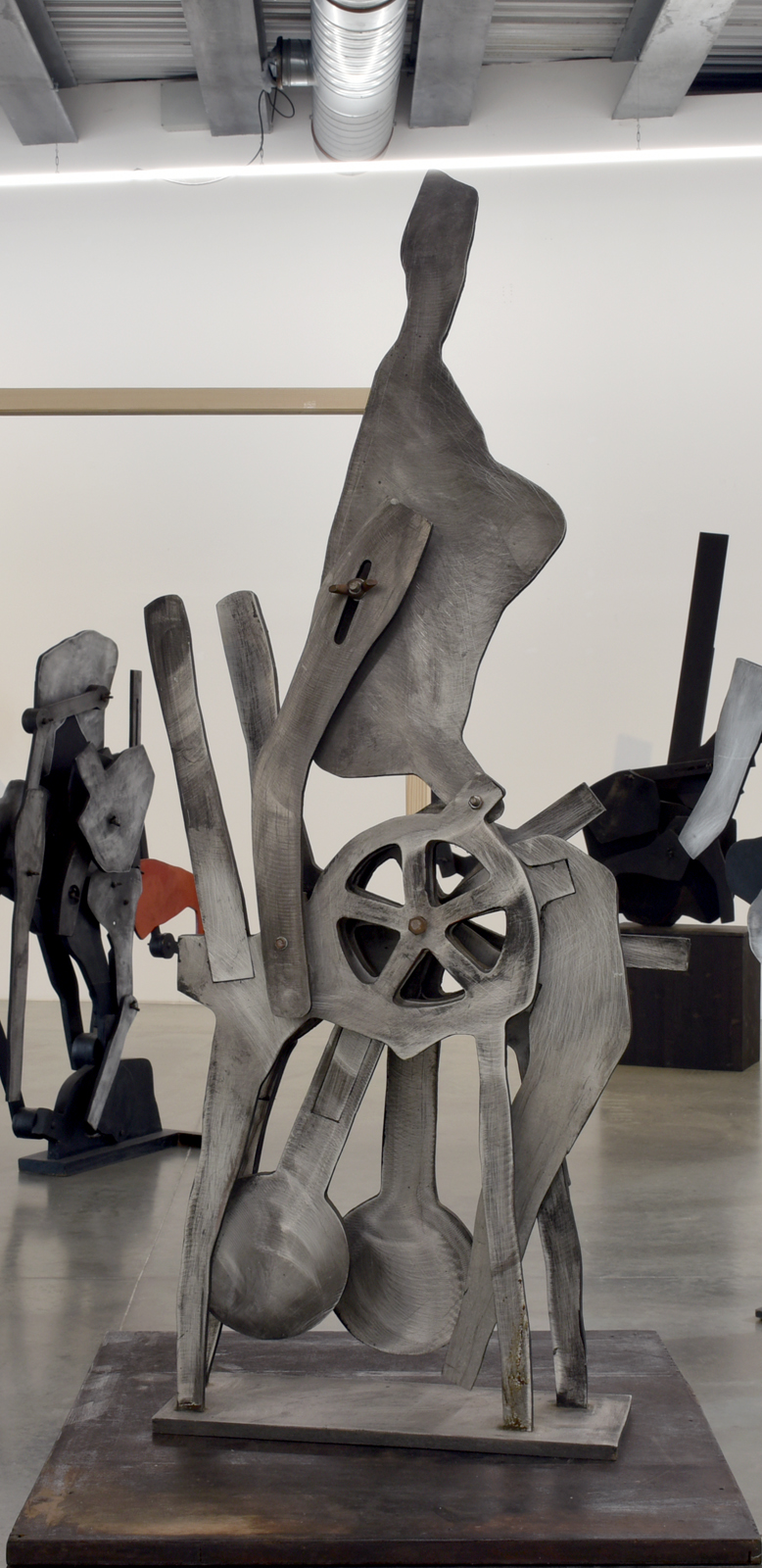
Woman with pendulum (1986)

=== Drawings ===
Vladimír Janoušek made several hundred mostly black and white ink drawings during his lifetime, sometimes combined with gouache. Although these were sketches of various stages of the creative process, Janoušek's drawing expression is so clear and definite that it gives the impression of finality. His large-scale drawings in particular are of high pictorial quality and form a distinct part of his oeuvre.

In the second half of the 1940s, he painted colour gouaches and ink drawings to record figurative scenes and to clarify compositional problems. In the early 1960s, he built on the legacy of synthetic cubism by denying realistic representation and consistently summarizing masses. Two drawings from this period anticipate later organic sculptures with wire construction. In 1964, he created a series of decals and the following year a series of washed-out drawings of landscapes. From the mid-1960s, he drew studies of sculptures in landscapes that thematize man's position in the world and are characterized by a relaxed painterly handwriting and dynamic composition. His ink drawings of black figures in space are a parallel, especially to his later variable sculptures. He already conceived the human figures in them as sculptures and thought through technical details such as connecting bolts and nuts. In the second half of the 1960s, when he realized his largest sculptures in metal, he suspended drawing.

He resumed drawing intensively in the 1970s, when he fell out of favour with the communist regime and found himself in social isolation. In these drawings, he suggests movement by drawing animation of a part of the spread out figure, its phasing, repetition and rhythmization. Spatial plans are marked by hatching or blackening, or by the mere outline of the figure. Sometimes the outline of the drawing was softened and tonally enriched by blurring. In his drawings he also dealt with the representation of movement in flat sculpture or relief in aluminium sheet, where the connection of screws allowed for manipulation and reconfiguration of the posture, but only within a defined space. The meaningful ambiguity of the sculptures, which have a distinct existential subtext, is highlighted this way. In the drawings from the late 1970s and 1980s, the motif of pendulums returns, most often as utopian projects with a vertical axis between the sky and the abyss that restricts the movement of the pendulum. The figures take the form of dehumanized puppets whose movement threatens to fall into the abyss. Since the early 1980s, Janoušek has intensified the motifs of cruelty and violence in his drawings (Man with a Scythe, 1983).

The figural drawings sometimes have blurred contours and blend into the background; the drawings from 1978 to 1986 are characterised by a relaxed, almost gestural brushwork. The single-figure drawings are more static and compositionally closed. In them, Janoušek conceives of a person without physical and psychological details as a generalised character in a drawing abbreviation. The tragic feeling of his own life is expressed in the second, multi-figure series of drawings, in which violence, aggression and the impossibility of compromise appear. The people in Janoušek's drawings are nomads wandering aimlessly through the landscape, blind men with white canes that make it difficult to walk, or a crowd attacking an invisible enemy. The drawing Repeated Beheading dates from 1981. The biblical theme of Sacrifice was transformed in the end-of-life drawings into the motif of killing a child (Killing, 1984), which reflects the feeling of defenselessness against the collective will that lacks moral order and destroys life at its beginning. One of his last drawings is White Sticks (1986) and a sketch of a seated angel with its head bowed, which takes the form of a grim reaper.

Janoušek's ideologically and artistically mature and profoundly human work is characterized by moral pathos, spiritual refinement and formal sophistication. Thanks to the artist's sensitivity, imagination, experience and knowledge, which is of general validity, his works raise questions that concern the basic feelings of being and the relationship of individual to men, space and time.

=== Sculptures in architecture and public space (selection) ===
- 1955 - relief, House of Fashion in Wenceslas Square
- 1958 - Music, high relief, laminate, height 6 m, Czechoslovak Pavilion Expo 58 Brussels, destroyed by the fire of the pavilion in Prague
- 1960 - Monument to Karel Hynek Mácha, Doksy
- 1960 - Man Conquers the Universe (height 560 cm, pylon 14 m), area in front of Strahov Stadium (destroyed)
- 1962 - Entrance sculpture for the International Ceramics Exhibition, foyer of the Brussels Pavilion, Prague (destroyed)
- 1963 - Allegorical Figure of a Woman, Příbram
- 1964 - The Sun, Podolí swimming stadium, Prague
- 1967 - Motherhood, Expo 67 Montréal
- 1969 - Nike, steel, building of the Czech Insurance Company Ostrava, missing
- 1969 - Sailboat, welded steel, fire reservoir Pardubice-Polabiny, later relocated in front of the primary school in Padubice-Polabiny II
- 1970 - Untitled, sculpture for the International Metal Symposium in Košice (destroyed)
- 1970 - The Threat of War, The Relentlessness of Time, Expo 70 in Osaka
- 1971 - Cloud, bronze, kinetic fountain at Kajetán Terrace, Prague 1 (removed)
- 1971 - Pegasus / Flying Machines, steel, Antonín Dvořák Theatre, Ostrava
- 1972 - Fire, Novodvorská housing estate (possibly commemorating the death of Jan Palach), relocated
- 1973 - Metalworkers and Metallurgists, sculpture originally intended for the foyer of the Cultural House in Kladno, not installed for political reasons, since then in the garden of the Janoušek's studio in Prague
- 1974 - Crystal of Air, metal, school courtyard, Kladno - Kročehlavy (removed)
- 1974 - Hours of Botany, sandstone, Přemyšlenská, Prague 8 - Kobylisy
- 1975 - Czech Landscape, fountain, St. George Monastery in Prague
- 1978 - Workers, Museum of the Highlands in Havlíčkův Brod
- 1980 - Flower, metal, Mejstříkova, Křtinská, Mnichovická, Prague 11
- 1980 - Twig, steel, mourning hall at Slezskoostravsky cemetery, Ostrava
- 1981 - Wings, mobile sculpture, Třebíč, destroyed
- 1982 - Flower, stainless steel, Jedovnická 2348/10, Brno - Líšeň
- 1982-1984 - Symbol of money industry, interior of Česká spořitelna, Olomouc
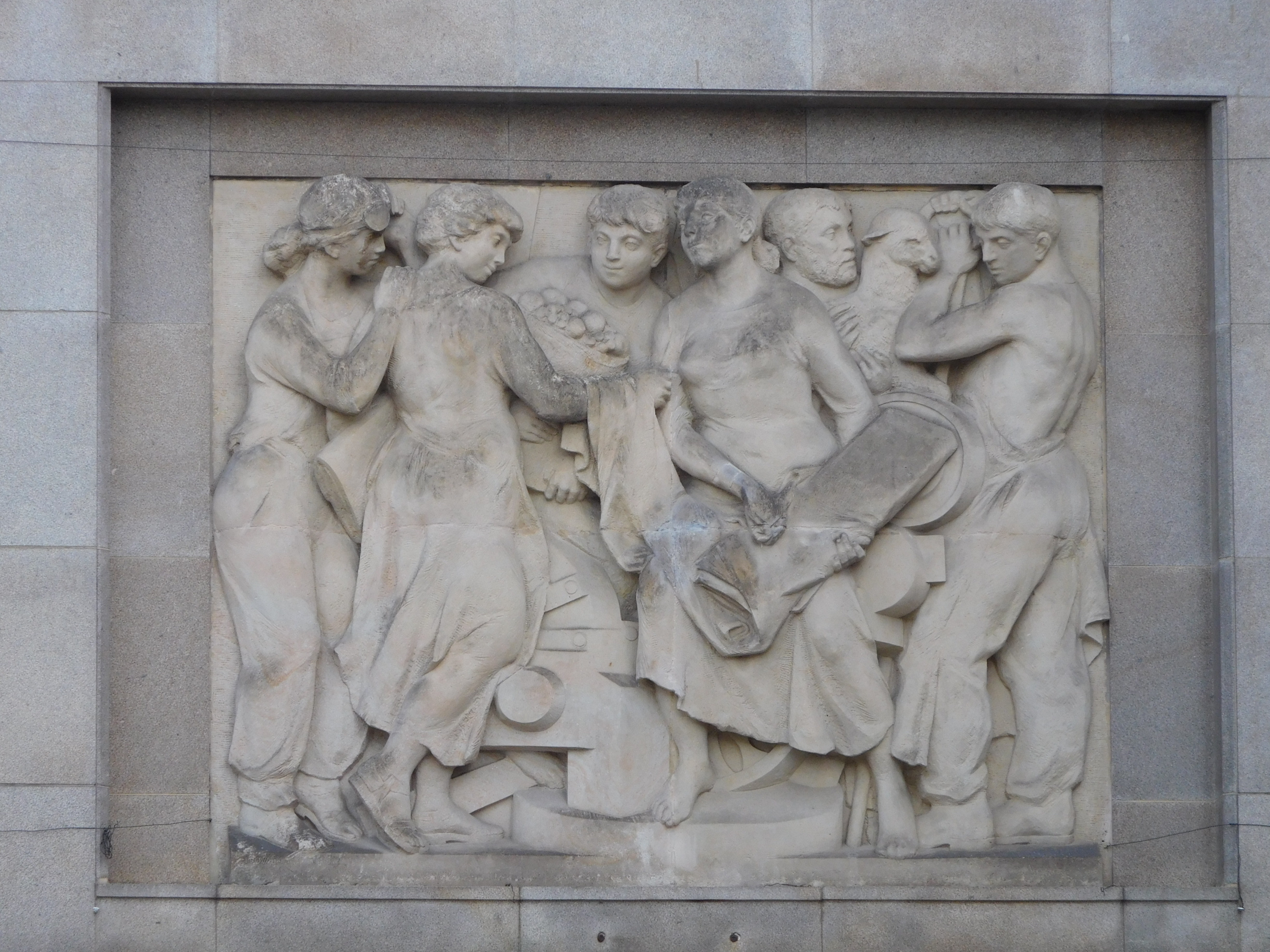
Vladimir Janoušek, Textile Industry and Trade (1956), House of Fashion, Prague

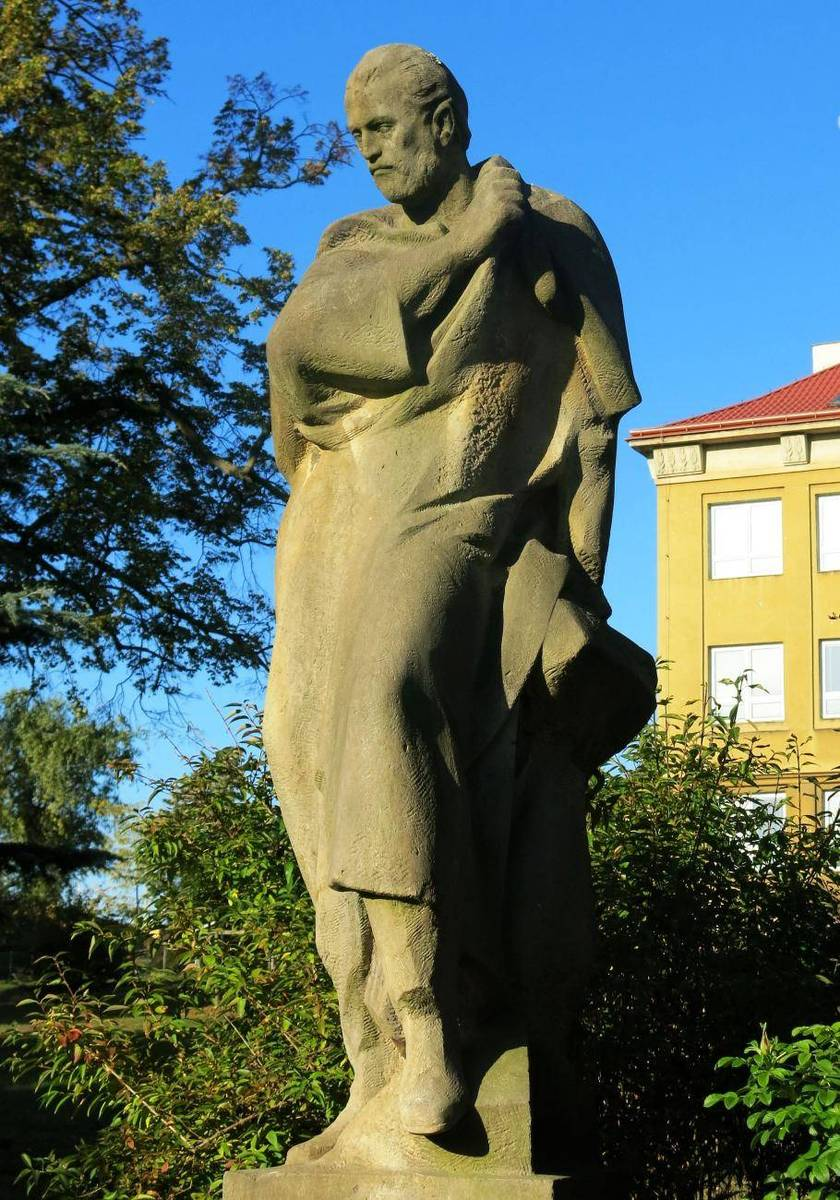
Vladimir Janoušek, Monument to Karel Hynek Mácha at the school in Doksy (1960)

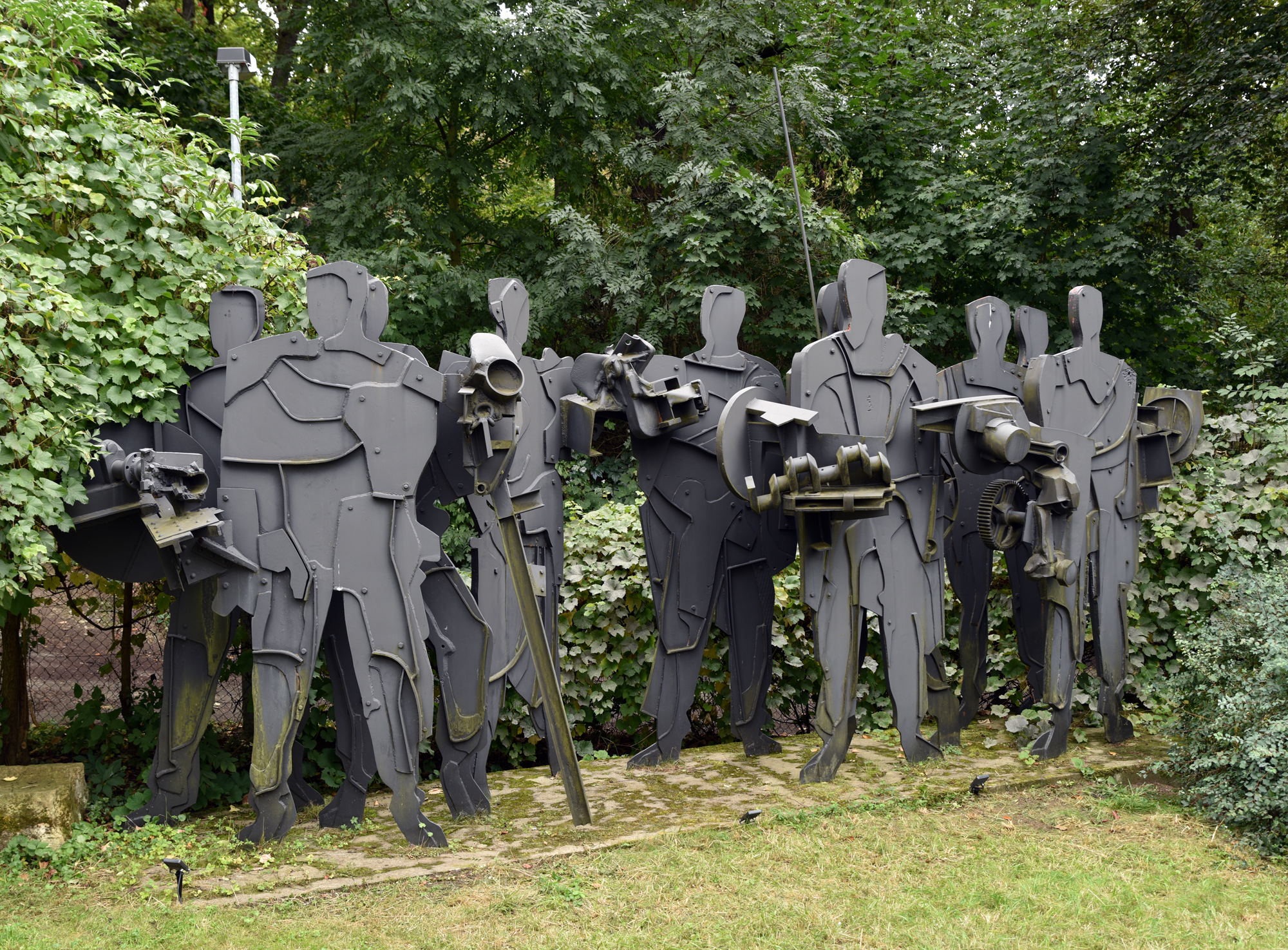
Vladimír Janoušek, Metalworkers and Metallurgists (1973), Janoušek's studio, Prague

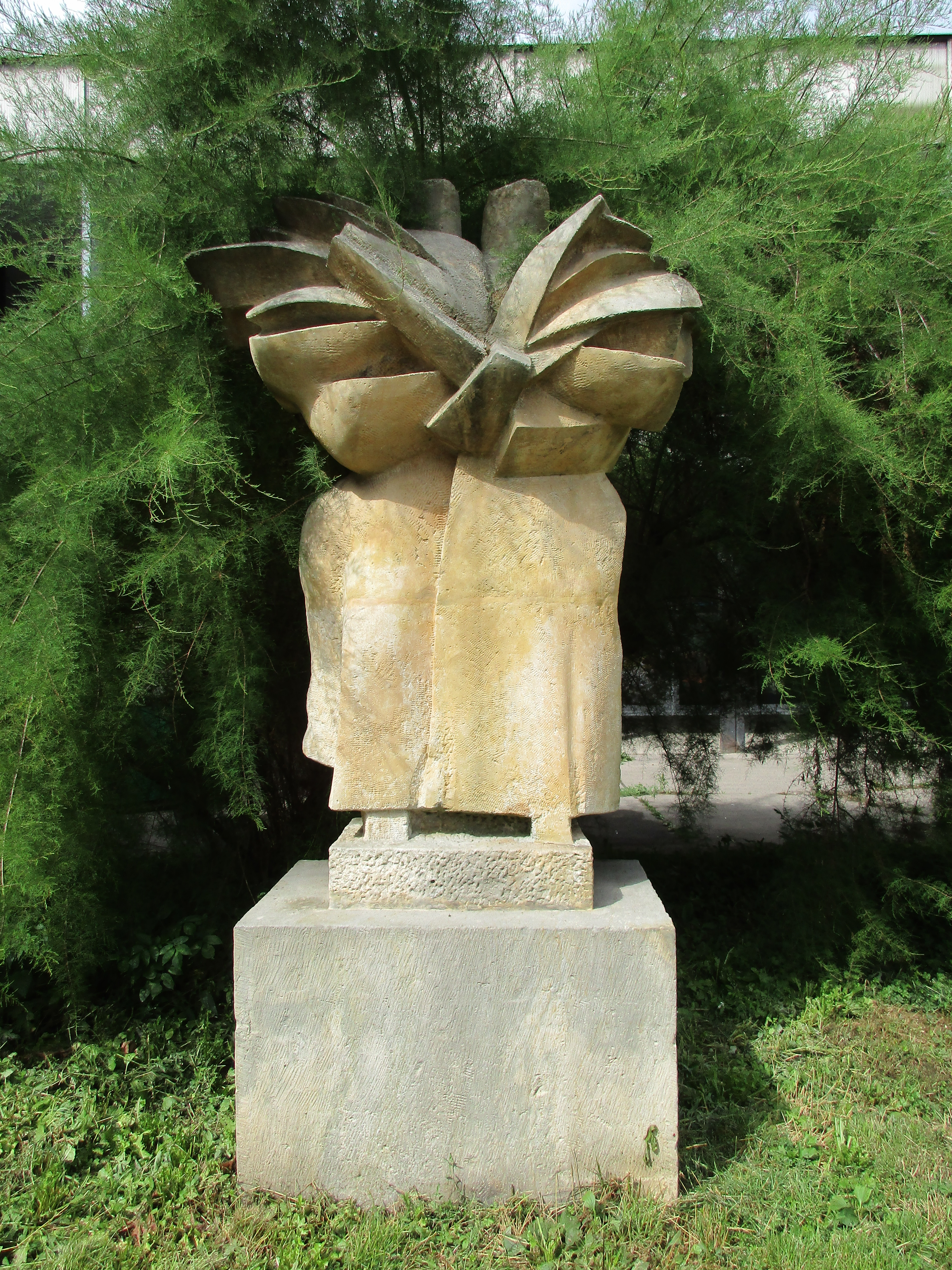
Vladimir Janoušek, Hours of Botany, Kobylisy (1974)

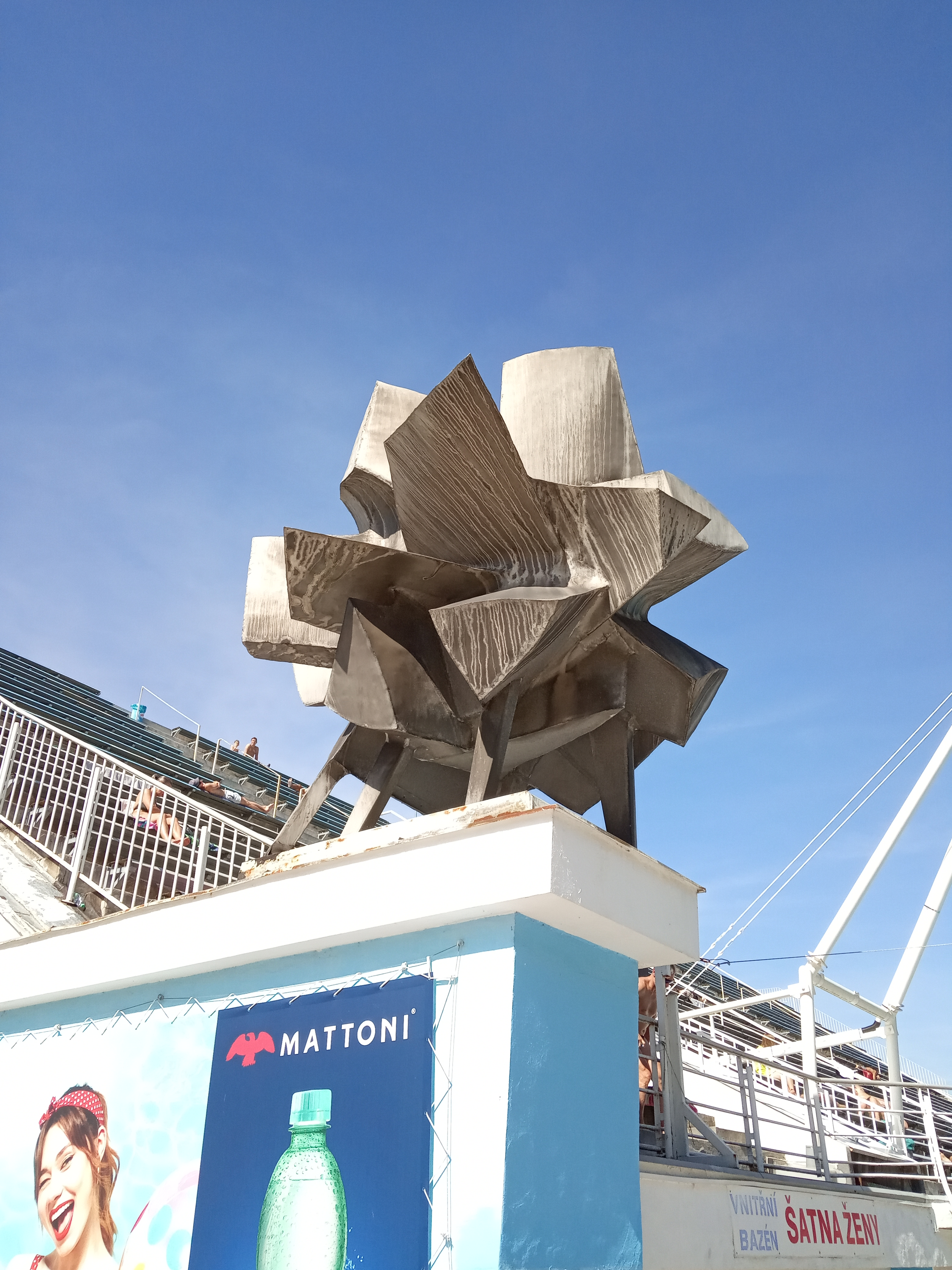
Vladimír Janoušek, The Sun (1964–1965), Podolí swimming stadium

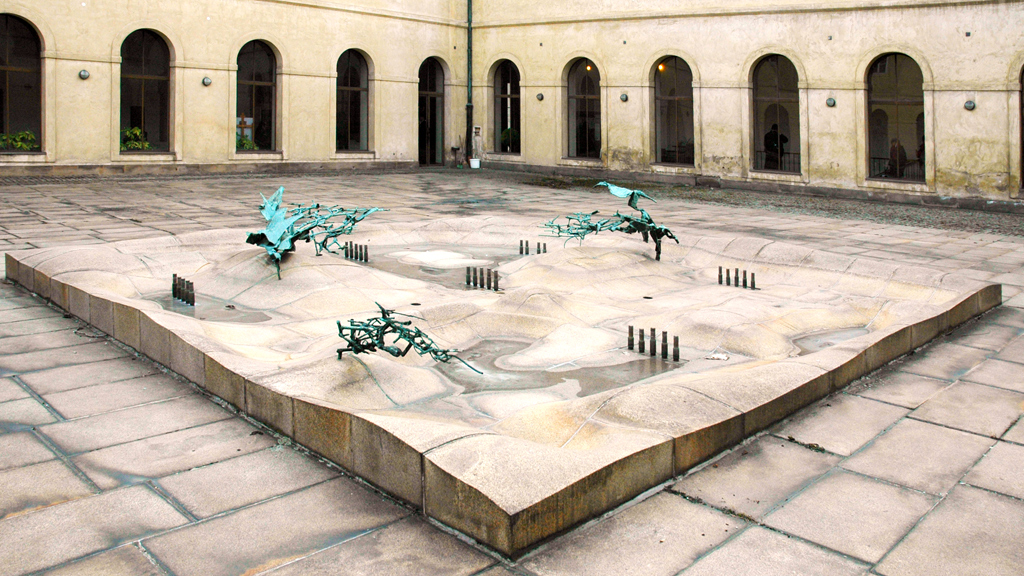
Vladimír Janoušek, Czech landscape (1975), St. George Monastery, Prague

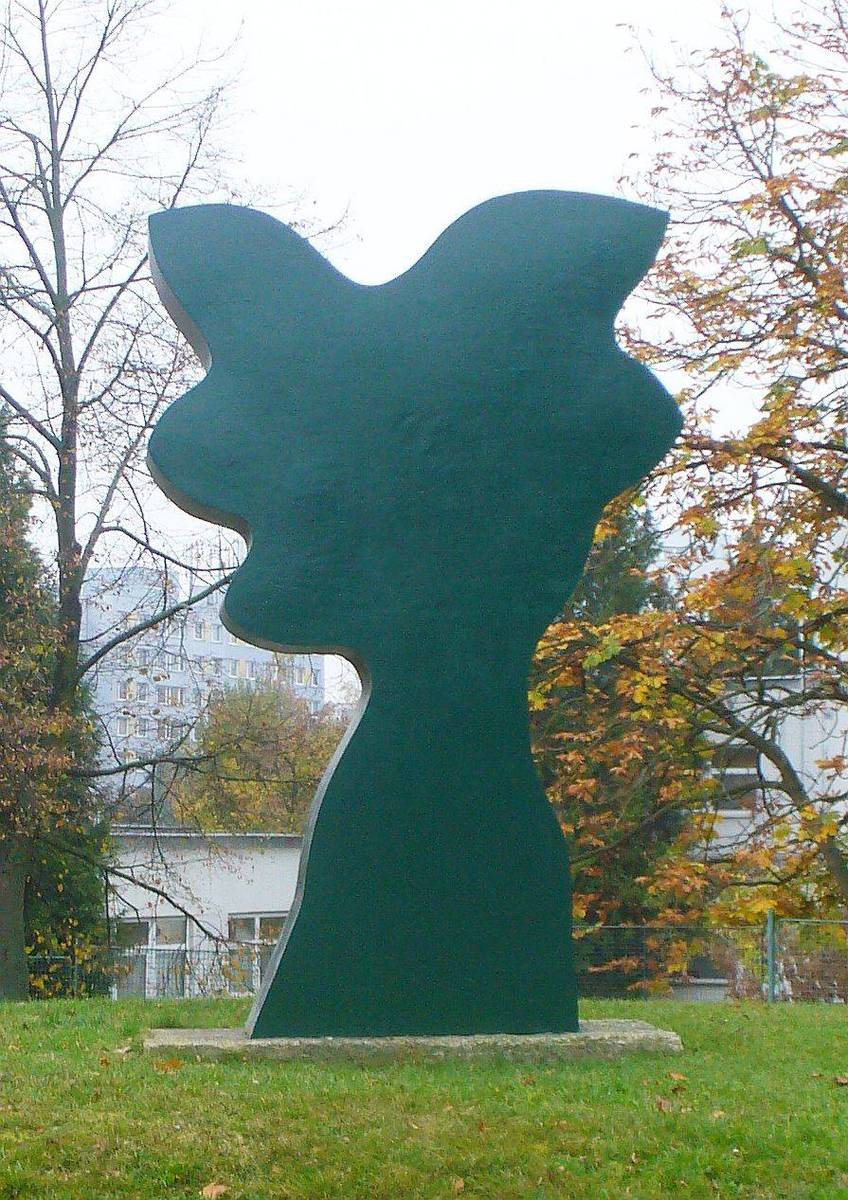
Vladimír Janoušek, Flower (1982), Ocelík Park, Prague

=== Representation in collections (selection) ===
- National Gallery Prague
- Museum Kampa, Prague
- Moravian Gallery in Brno
- Aleš South Bohemian Gallery Hluboká nad Vltavou
- Art Gallery Karlovy Vary
- Regional Gallery of Fine Arts in Zlín
- Regional Gallery Liberec
- Gallery of the Central Bohemian Region in Kutná Hora
- West Bohemian Gallery in Plzeň
- Gallery of Fine Arts in Ostrava
- Gallery of Fine Arts in Cheb
- Gallery of Modern Art in Hradec Králové
- Gallery of Modern Art in Roudnice nad Labem
- Regional Gallery of the Highlands in Jihlava
- North Bohemian Art Gallery in Litoměřice
- Gallery of Fine Arts in Hodonín
- Gallery Klatovy / Klenová
- Museum of Art and Design Benešov

=== Exhibitions ===
==== Solo exhibitions (selection) ====
- 1967 – Pendulums and other sculptures, Nová síň, Prague
- 1967 – Sculptures, Regional Gallery Liberec (with Věra Janoušková)
- 1982 – Paintings and Drawings, House of Culture, Orlová
- 1982 – Institute of Macromolecular Chemistry, Prague
- 1986 – Sculpture and Drawings, Small Gallery of Stavoprojekt, Brno (exhibition banned)
- 1987 – The Last Sculptures, Institute of Sculpture, Prague
- 1987 – Drawings, Opatov Gallery, Prague
- 1989 – Vladimír Janoušek 1922-1986, National Gallery Prague
- 1989 – Selected Drawings, National Gallery Prague - Zbraslav Monastery
- 1990 – Retrospective, Stone Bell House, Prague City Gallery
- 1993 – Last works, Hořice Gallery
- 1994 – Gallery at Pecka (with Věra Janoušková)
- 1998 – Sculptures and collages, Turčianska galéria, Martin, Slovakia, (with Věra Janoušková)
- 1998/1999 – Vladimír Janoušek unknown, White Unicorn Gallery Klatovy, Regional Gallery of the Highlands in Jihlava
- 1999 – Trigon Gallery, Plzeň (with Věra Janoušková)
- 1999 – Movement and Transformations in Sculpture, Millennium Gallery, Prague
- 2002/2004 – Věra and Vladimír Janoušek, Brno, Prague, Plzeň
- 2010 – Věra Janoušková, Vladimír Janoušek: Odkaz / Legacy, Nebílovy Castle
- 2015/2016 – Věra Janoušková & Vladimír Janoušek: Kristus a kyvadlo / Christ and pendulum, Museum Kampa, Prague
- 2020/2021 – Times, Museum Kampa
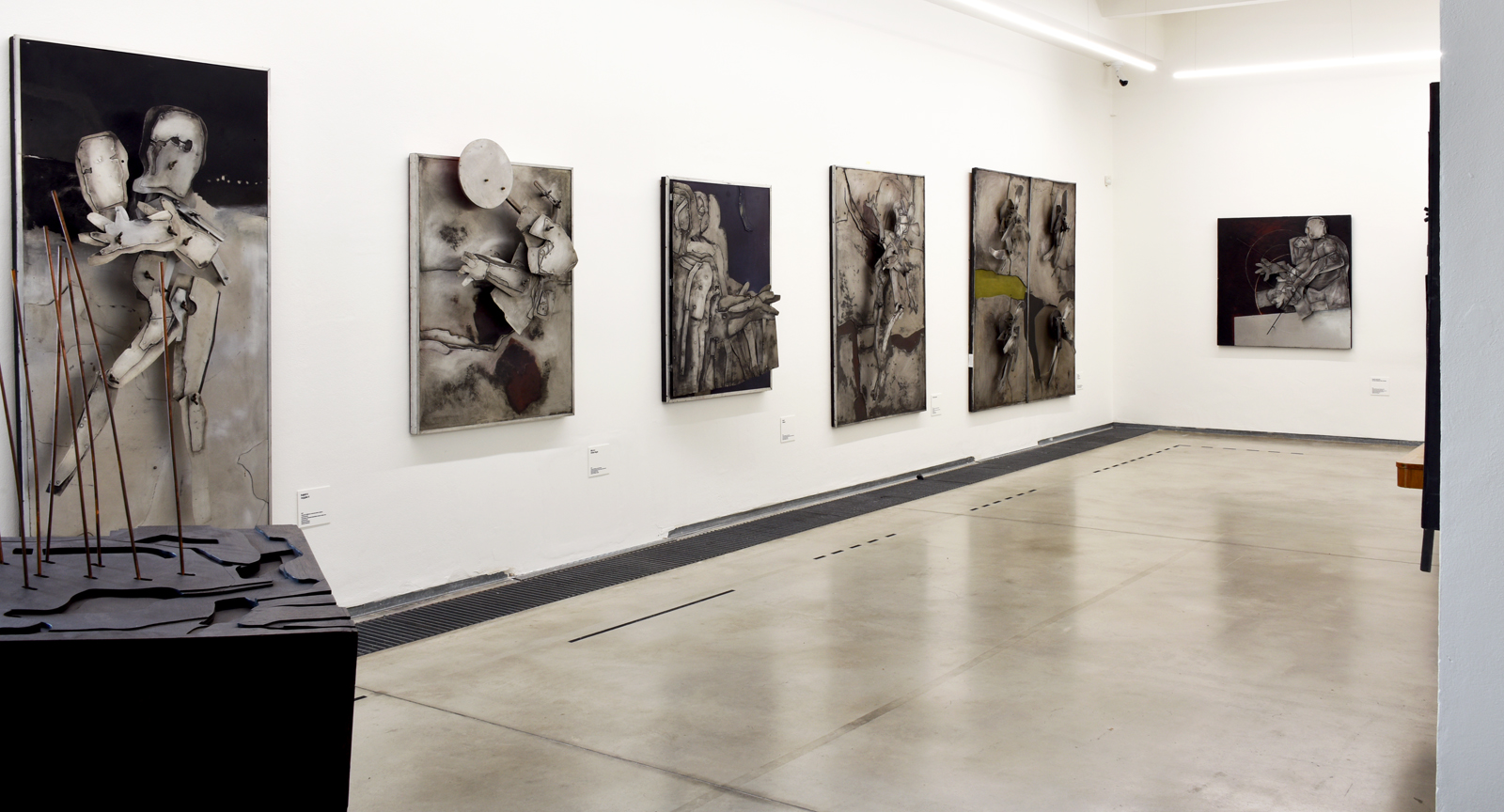
Vladimír Janoušek: Times, Museum Kampa 2021

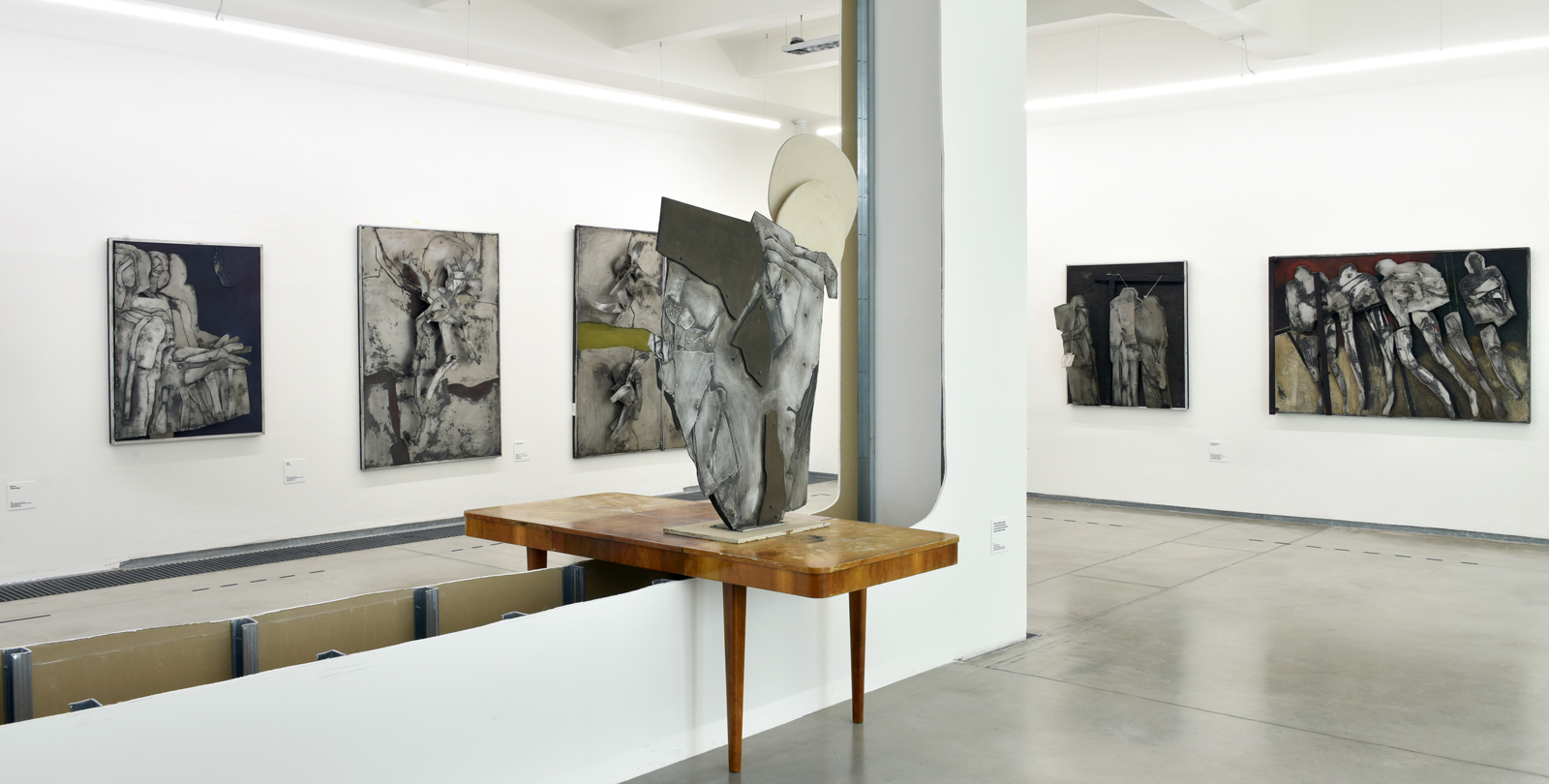
Vladimír Janoušek: Times, Museum Kampa 2021

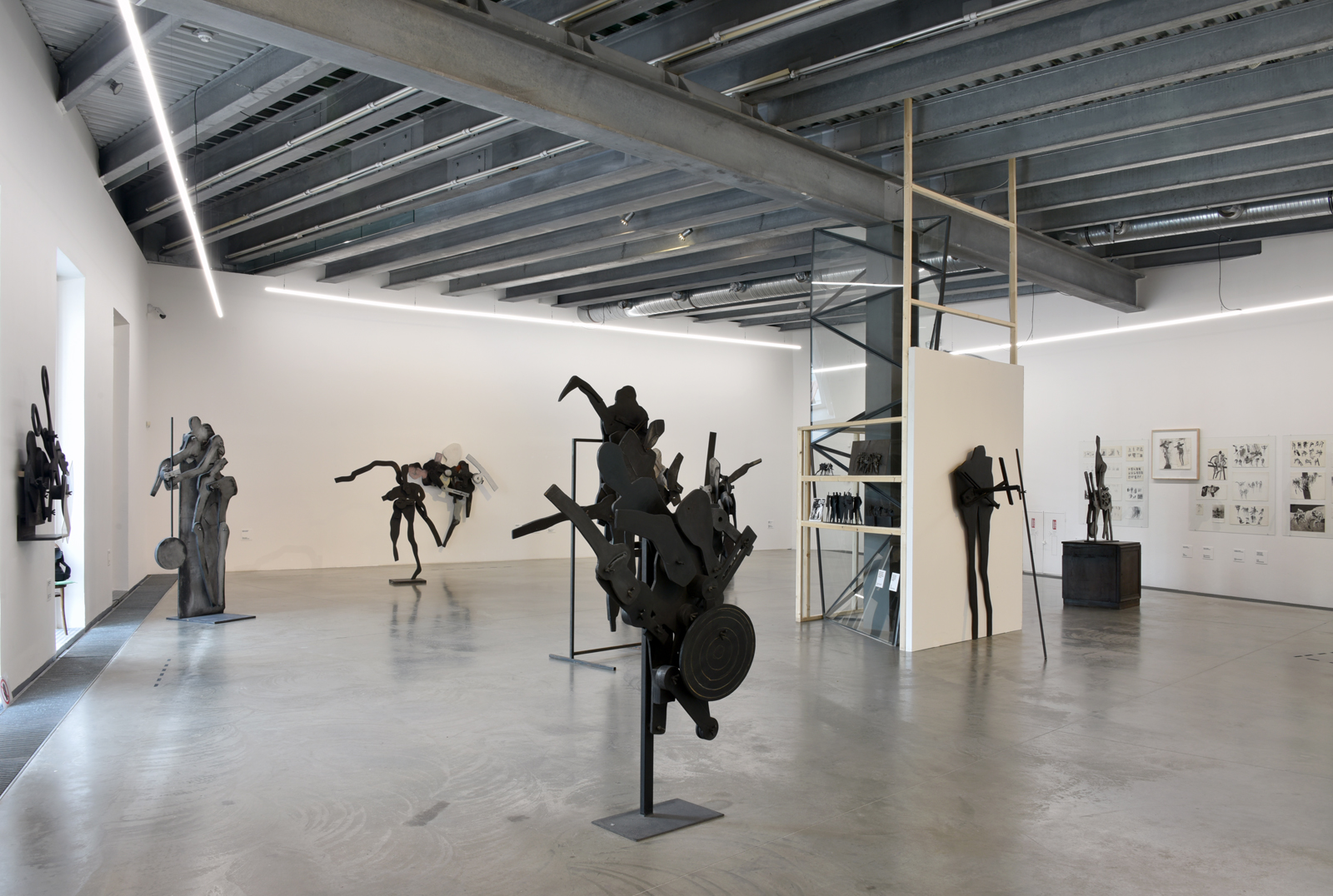
Vladimír Janoušek: Times, Museum Kampa 2021

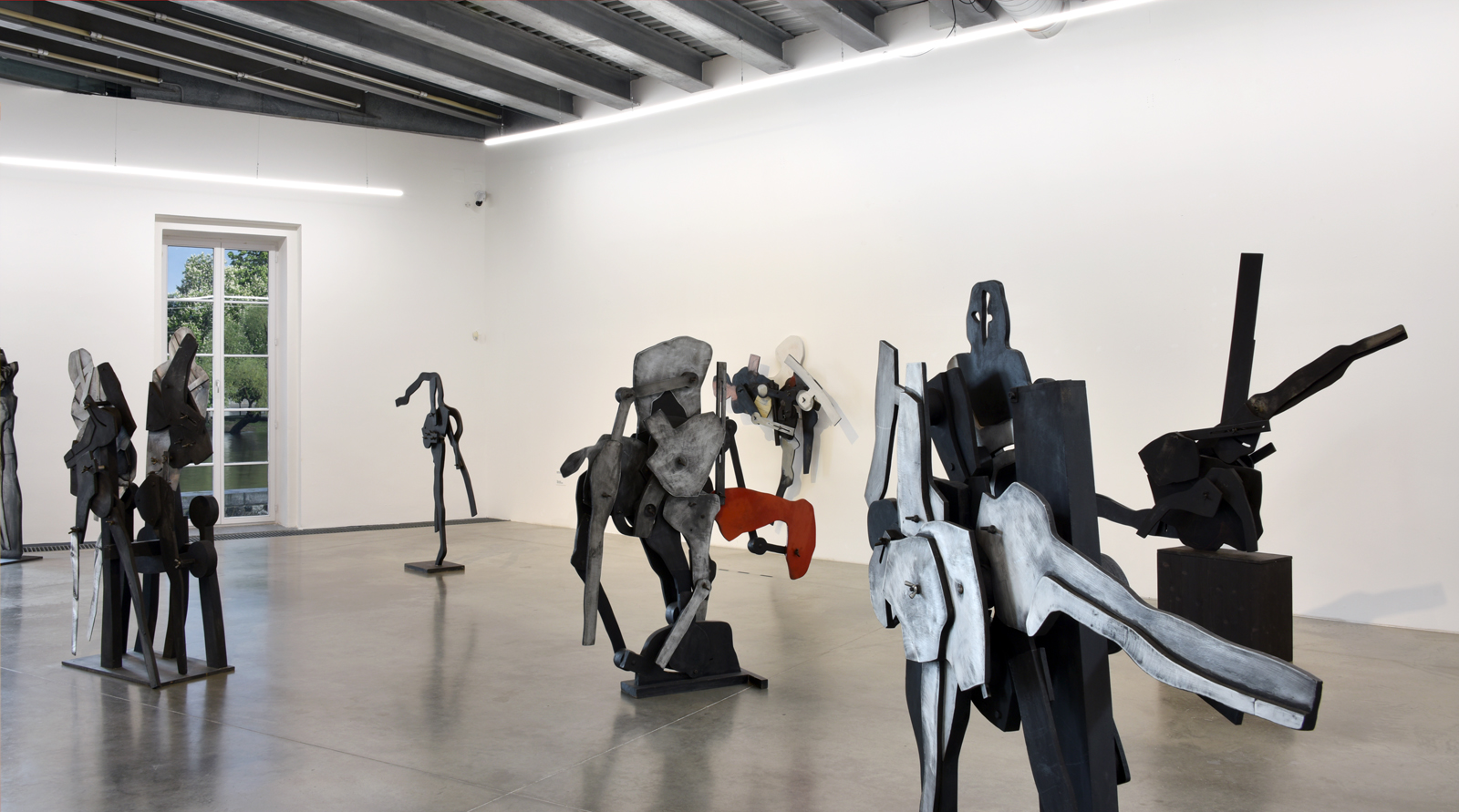
Vladimír Janoušek: Times, Museum Kampa 2021

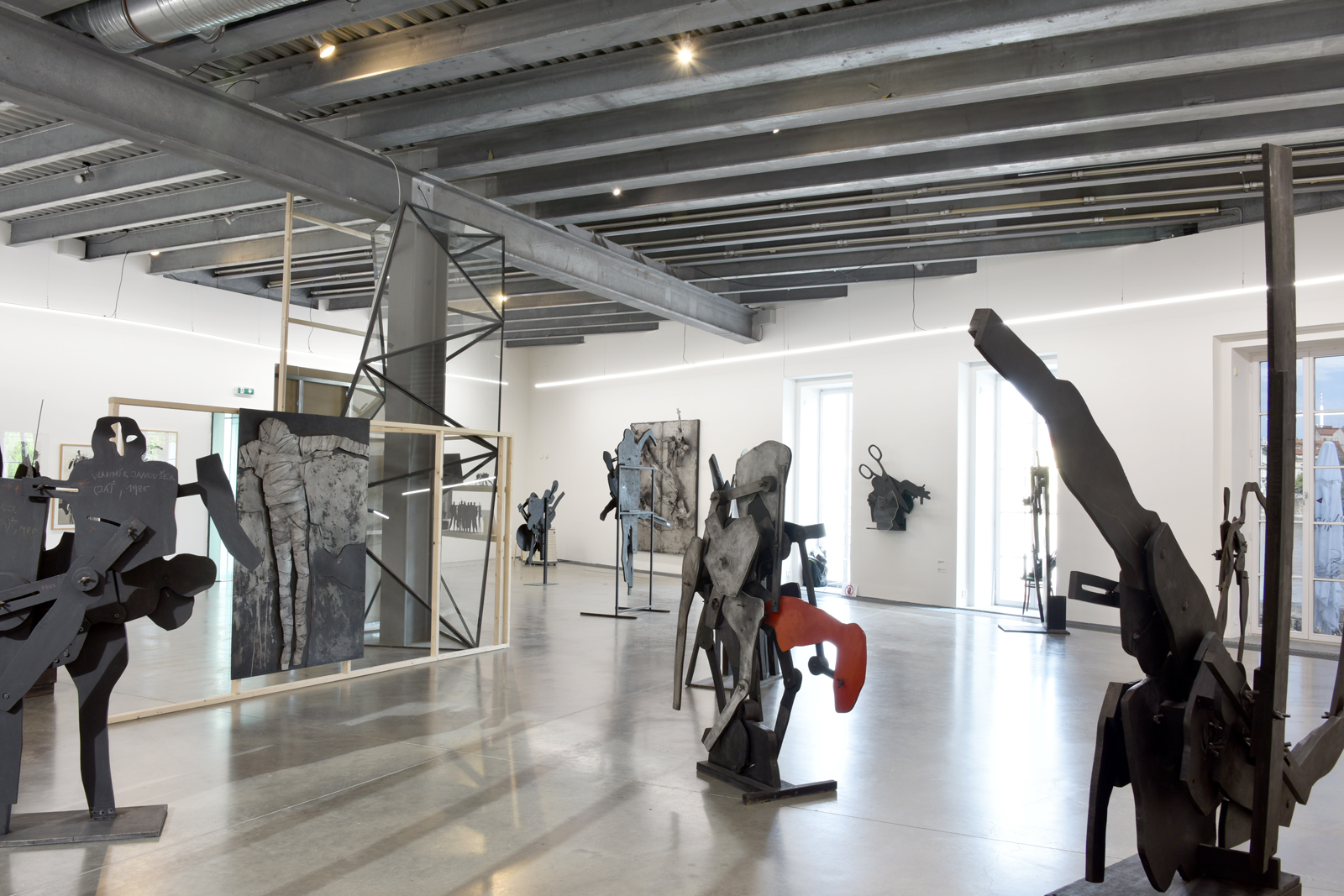
Vladimír Janoušek: Times, Museum Kampa 2021

==== Collective exhibitions (selection) ====
- 1954 – Czechoslovak art of the 19th and 20th centuries, Budapest, Moscow, Warsaw, Beijing
- 1954 – 27th Venice Biennale, Venice
- 1955 – 3rd Czechoslovak Fine Art Show, Prague
- 1958 – Expo 58, Brussels
- 1959 – 2nd Biennale internazionale di scultura, Carrara
- 1959 – Czechoslovak Fine Arts, Helsinki, Copenhagen
- 1961 – 2nd exposition internationale de sculpture contemporaine, Musée Rodin, Paris
- 1962 – Jaro / Spring 62, Mánes, Prague
- 1964 – Socha / Sculpture 1964, Liberec
- 1965 – Tschechoslowakische Kunst heute, Baden-Baden
- 1965 – La transfiguration de l'art tchèque: Peinture - sculpture - verre - collages, Palais de Congrès de Liège, Lutych
- 1966 – Current Tendencies, Mánes, Prague
- 1967 – Expo 67, Montreal
- 1967 – Tschechoslowakische Plastik von 1960 gegenwart, Essen, Berlin
- 1967 – Mostra d'arte contemporanea cecoslovaccha, Turin
- 1967 – 9th Biennale, Openluchtmuseum, Antwerp
- 1968 – Sculpture tchècoslovaque de Myslbek à nos jours, Musée Rodin (Hôtel Biron), Paris
- 1968 – 300 painters and sculptors of five generations, U Hybernů, Prague
- 1969 – New Figuration, Mánes, Prague
- 1969 – L'art tchèque actuel, Renault Champs - Élysées, Paris
- 1969 – Arte contemporanea in Cecoslovacchia, Gallerie nazionale d'arte moderna, Rome
- 1969 – Mai csehszlovák képzőművészet, Műcsarnok, Kunsthalle Budapest
- 1970 – Expo '70, Osaka
- 1970 – Art tchèque du XXe siècle, Musée Rath, Geneva
- 1970 – 9. Premio Internacional de Dibujo Joan Miró, Col·legi d'Arquitectes de Catalunya, Barcelona
- 1970 – Tschechische Skulptur des 20. Jahrhunderts: Von Myslbek bis zur Gegenwart, Schloß Charlottenburg - Orangerie, Berlin
- 1970 – Tschechische Kunst des 20. Jahrhunderts: Einige Aspekte der Entwicklung, Kunsthaus Zürich
- 1980/1981 – Eleven contemporary artists from Prague, New York City, Ann Arbor, Michigan
- 1984 – Large Drawing, Gallery H, Kostelec nad Černými lesy
- 1985 – Color Sculpture, Gallery H, Kostelec nad Černými lesy
- 1988 – Rzeźba czeska i słowacka 1948–1988, Galeria Związku Artystów Rzeźbiarzy, Warsaw
- 1988 – Contemporary Art in Czechoslovakia, Cornell University, Ithaca, New York
- 1991 – Hýbače (kinetic variable art), Východoslovenská galéria, Košice, Galéria Gerulata, Bratislava, Národní technické muzeum, Prague
- 1991 – Tradition und Avantgarde in Prag, Rheinisches Landesmuseum Bonn
- 1992 – Arte contemporanea ceca e slovacca 1950 - 1992, Palazzo del Broletto, Novara
- 1993/1994 – New Figuration, SGVU Litoměřice, VG Pardubice, Moravian Gallery Brno, DU Opava
- 1993–2003 – Minisalon, Mons, Hollywood, Cincinnati, New York City, Indianapolis, Cedar Rapids, Albuquerque, Chicago, Columbia, North Dartmouth, St. Petersburg, Florida, Fort Myers, Prague, Brussels, Jakarta, Ubud, Surabaya, Paris
- 1996/1997 – Umění zastaveného času / Art when time stood still: Czech art scene 1969–1985, Prague, Cheb
- 1999/2000 – Umění zrychleného času / The Art of Accelerated Time: Czech art scene 1958–1968, Prague, Cheb

== Sources ==
=== Monographs ===
- Vladimír Janoušek, text by Jiří Šetlík, Karel Srp, Jaromír Zemina, 68 p., Prague City Gallery 1990
- Karel Srp (ed.), Vladimír Janoušek, Časy / Times, 580 p., (Czech, English), Museum Kampa - The Jan and Meda Mládek Foundation, Prague 2020, ISBN 978-80-87344-58-3

=== Author catalogues ===
- Jiří Šetlík: Vladimír Janoušek, Contemporary Profiles 12 (new series), SČSVU Prague 1962
- Jaromír Zemina, Pendulums and other sculptures by Vladimír Janoušek, 12 p., Nová síň Gallery, Prague 1967
- Ludmila Vachtová: Vladimír Janoušek - Sculptures, 20 p., Regional Gallery Liberec 1967
- Ivo Janoušek: Vladimír Janoušek - Paintings and Drawings, Moravské tiskárny závody, n.p., Nový Jičín 1982
- Karel Srp, Situation 15 (Vladimír Janoušek - Changes), Jazz Section 1983, samizdat
- Karel Srp, Somebody Something (interview with V. Janoušek), 1986, samizdat
- Josef Hlaváček: Vladimír Janoušek, 4 p., catalogue for the exhibition in the Small Gallery of Stavoprojekt Brno, which was banned, 1986
- Ivo Janoušek: Vladimír Janoušek - sculptures, ÚKDŽ Prague 1987
- Ivo Janoušek: Vladimír Janoušek, Cultural Centre Opatov, Prague 1987
- Václav Erben: Vladimír Janoušek 1922-1986: Selection of drawings, National Gallery Prague 1989
- Jaromír Zemina: Vladimír Janoušek - Drawings, Art Gallery, Žďár nad Sázavou, Pallas Gallery, Prague 1993 (German and English summary)
- Jaromír Zemina: Vladimír Janoušek: The Sculptor and His Region, Municipal Museum, Nová Paka 1993
- Ivan Neumann et al., Vladimír Janoušek: Sculptures, Reliefs, Drawings, MAG Gallery, Jablonec nad Nisou 1995
- Why I do it this way (texts Zemina, J., Janoušek, V., 120 p., (Czech, English), Portal Book House, Uherské Hradiště 1995
- Ivan Neumann et al., Vladimír Janoušek: Sculptures, Synagogue Gallery, Hranice 1997
- Jaromír Zemina: Vladimír Janoušek unknown, Klatovy / Klenová Gallery 1998, ISBN 80-85628-25-2
- Věra Janoušková, Miroslav Koval: Vladimír Janoušek - Drawings and Outline Sculptures, Jiří Jílek Gallery, Šumperk 2002

=== Selected publications ===
- Kunst unserer Zeit, 321 p., M. DuMont Schauberg, Cologne 1966
- Bénamou, G., L'art aujourd'hui an Tchecoslovaquie (190 p., fr.), Paris 1979
- Proceedings "Grey Brick", 322 p., Jazz Section, 1985, samizdat
- Kudlička, J. M., Proceedings on the occasion of his 65th birthday, pp. V. J., 168 p., 1986, samizdat
- Josef Hlaváček, Statements of Art, 240 p., Severočeské nakl. 1991 ISBN 80-7047-042-9
- Jindřich Chalupecký, New Art in Bohemia, 173 p., Ars pictura, publisher. H+H, 1994 - ISBN 80-85787-81-4
- Josef Hlaváček, Czech Kineticism of the 1960s, ´60/´70 Gallery, Prague 1994
- Alena Potůčková et al., Umění zastaveného času / Art when Time stood still. Czech Art Scene 1969 - 1985, 268 p., Czech Museum of Fine Arts, Prague 1996 ISBN 80-7056-050-9
- Polana Bregantová et al., České umění ze sbírek GHMP, 280 p., Prague City Gallery, 1998 ISBN 80-7010-057-5
- Magdalena Juříková, Vladimír Železný, Šedesátá / The sixties, 414 p., (cz. en.), Zlatá husa Gallery, Prague 2004 ISBN 80-239-3406-6
- Milena Slavická, Jiří Šetlík, UB12, Studie, rozhovory, dokumenty, 337 s., . Gallery s. r. o., Prague 2006 ISBN 80-86990-07-9
- Bieleszová-Müllerová, Š., a kol., Nechci v kleci / No cage for me, (cz., en.), 247 p., MU Olomouc 2008 ISBN 978-80-87149-04-1
- Jiří Machalický, Czech Collage, 254 p., Gallery s.r.o., Prague 2010
- Polana Bregantová (ed.), Via Artis Via Vitae (bibliography of J. Zemina), 997 p., Torst, Prague 2010 ISBN 978-80-7215-403-6

=== Encyclopedias ===
- Toman Prokop, Appendices to the Dictionary of Czechoslovak Visual Artists, State Publishing House of Beautiful Literature, Music and Art, n.p. (SNKLHU), Prague 1955
- Mailard, R., (ed.), Nouveau dictionnaire de la sculpture moderne, Hazan, Paris 1970, p. 145, ISBN 978-0-8288-6551-7
- Václav Král, Small Encyclopedic Dictionary (A - Z), Academia, Prague 1972
- Small Czechoslovak Encyclopedia (I-L), Academia, Prague 1986
- Illustrated Encyclopedia (J - P), Encyklopedický dům, s.r.o., Prague 1995
- Lenka Bydžovská et al., Czech Modern Art 1900–1960, 349 p., National Gallery in Prague, 1995, ISBN 80-7035-095-4
- Horová A (ed.), Nová encyklopedie českého výtvarného umění / New Encyclopedia of the Czech Art, vol.1., A-M, Academia, Prague 1995 ISBN 80-200-0521-8
- General Encyclopedia in four volumes (Volume 2: g/l), 700 p., OP Publishing House, Prague 1996
- Dictionary of Czech and Slovak Visual Artists 1950-1999 (IV. CH - J), Chagall Art Centre, Ostrava 1999
- General Encyclopedia in eight volumes (3: g/j), Diderot, Prague 1999

=== Articles (selection) ===
- Alexej Kusák, Interview with Vladimír Janoušek, Výtvarná práce, 12 (1964), no. 7, p. 8
- Vladimír Janoušek on himself, Výtvarné umění, 1966, no. 2, pp. 82–85
- Jiří Šetlík, On the premiere of Vladimír Janoušek, Výtvarná práce, 1967, no. 9, p. 5
